= YKA =

YKA may refer to:

- Young Kikuyu Association, a Kenyan political party (founded 1921)
- Yuri Kuma Arashi, a 2010s Japanese manga, anime series and novel
- Yves Ker Ambrun (1954–2017), French artist
- Kamloops Airport, British Columbia, Canada (IATA:YKA)
