= Hôtel Goüin =

Coordinates: 47°23′42″N 0°41′05″E

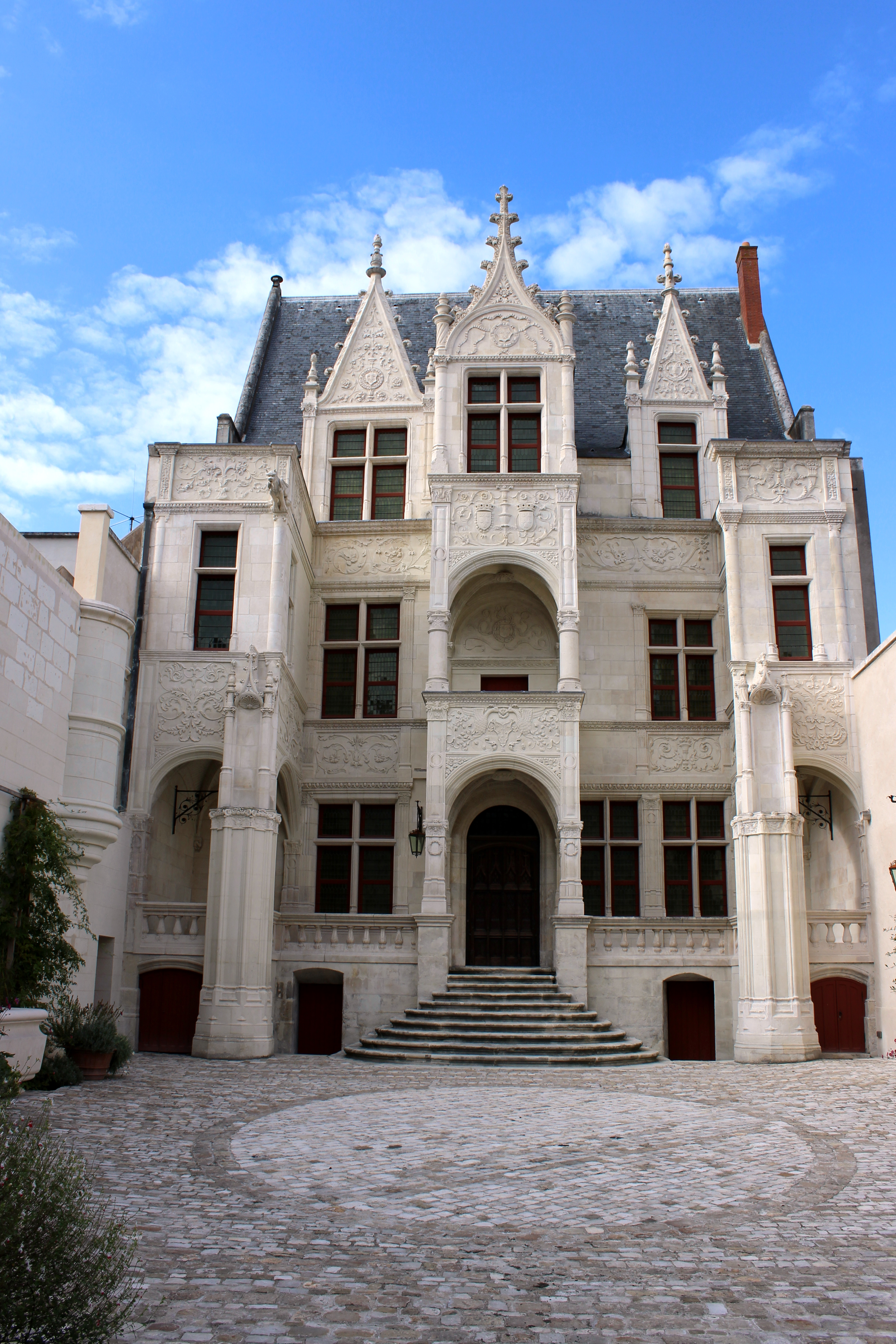
Hôtel Goüin

The Hôtel Goüin is a hôtel particulier in Tours, France.

== History ==
The mansion was built in the 15th century and is incorrectly considered to have been the home of Jean de Xaincoings, treasurer of the assets of Charles VII. The house was the property of René Gardette, a descendant of a family of silk merchants from Tours. The reworking of the facade that dates from the 16th century includes the addition of the porch and loggia and the left wing in early Renaissance style. The sub-basement contains Galloroman remains.

The name Goüin is taken from a wealthy family of Breton bankers who purchased the building in 1738. The family undertook several improvements including the balcony over the rear courtyard, demolition of two houses on the roadside, the enlargement of the south yard, removal of the south balcony, and construction of the entry gate.

In 1944 during the Second World War the building was almost entirely destroyed by bombs leaving only the facade intact. In the 1950s the main accommodation and the entrance were partially restored, while no traces of the garden and north yard remain.

The building once hosted the Société archéologique de Touraine (Touraine Archeological Society), and is now the home of the Goüin Museum. In 1967, on the occasion of the 40th congress of the French Federation of Philatelic Societies, the building was featured on the 0.40 franc postage stamp.

== Gallery ==
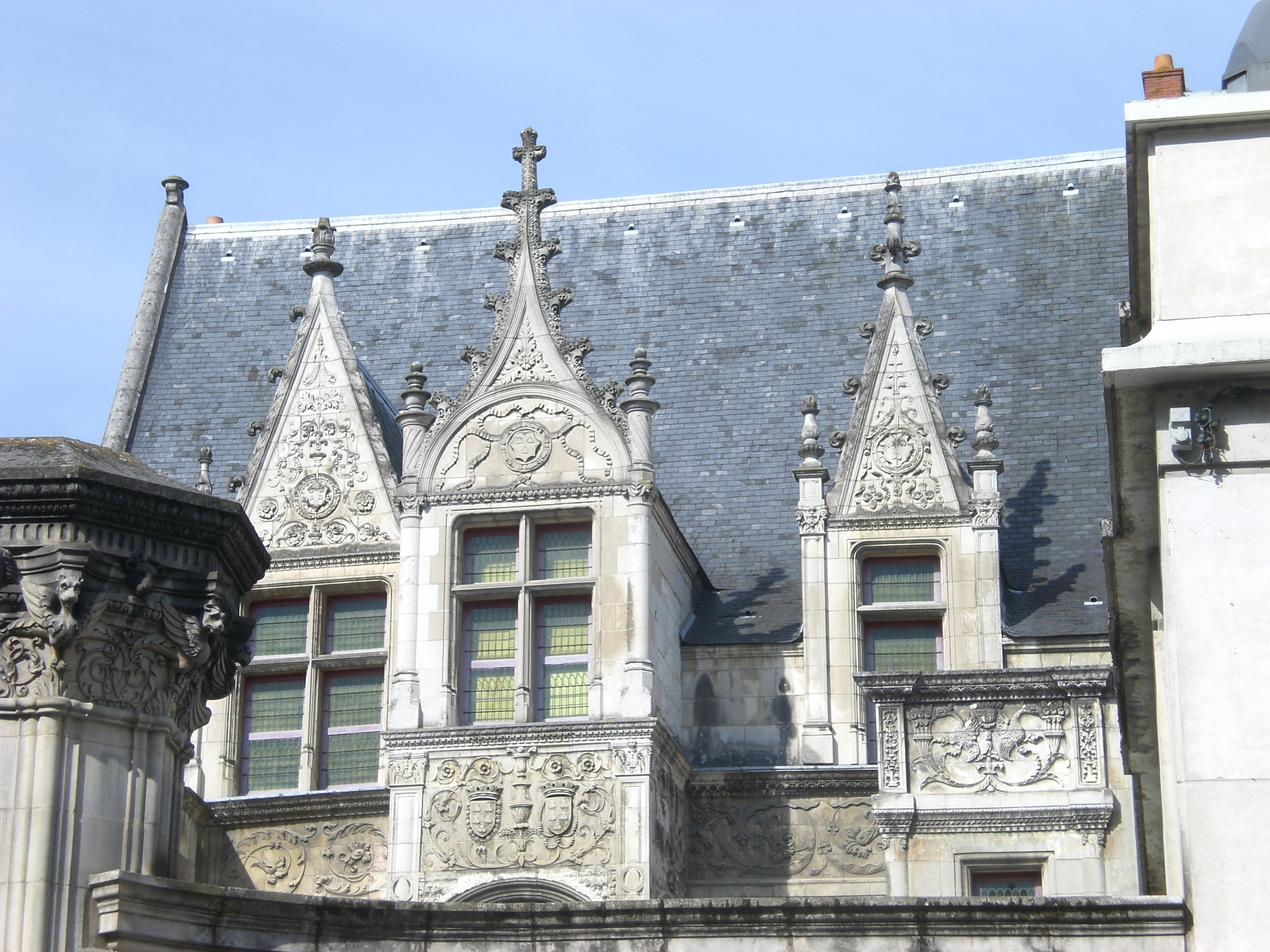
Détail de l'hôtel.

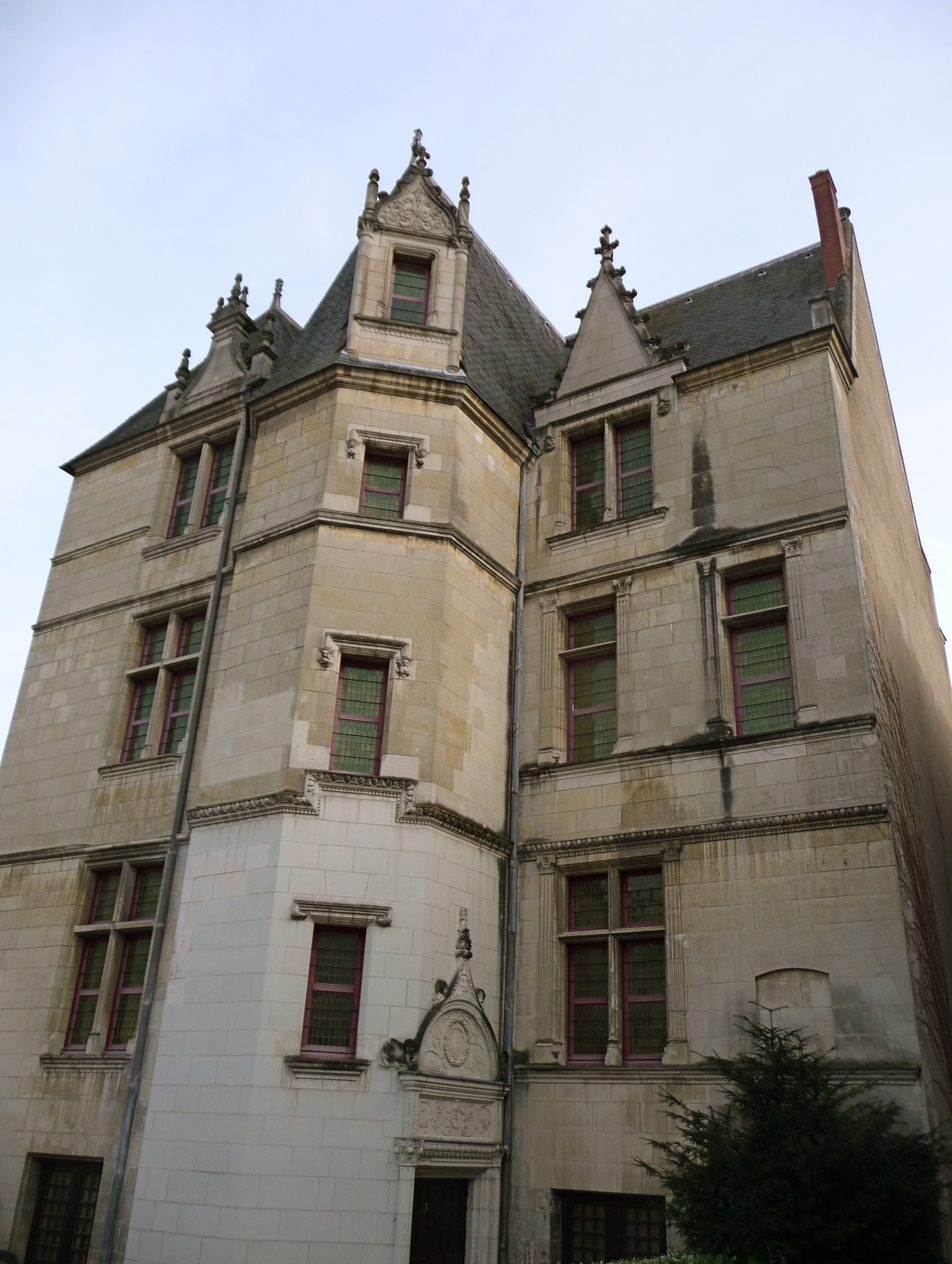
Facade nord de l'Hôtel Goüin.

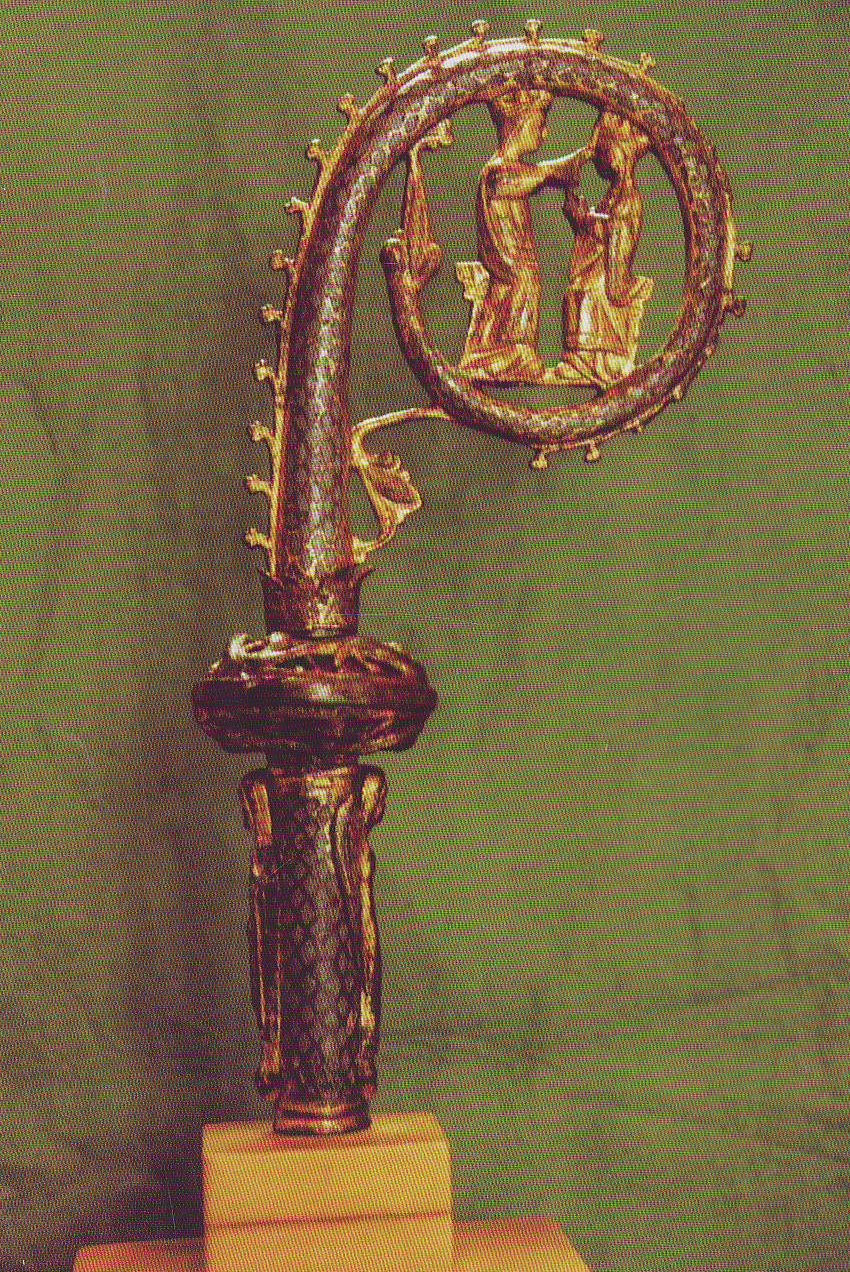
13th century Crosier of the Abbot of Villeloin (collection Museum Goüin).

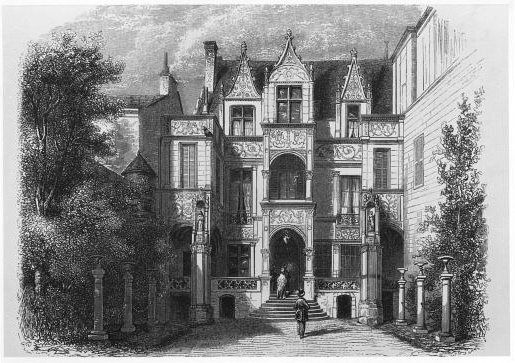
Engraving of Hôtel Goüin by Karl Girardet

== See also ==
- Alexandre Goüin
- Ernest Goüin
- Eugène Goüin

== Sources ==
- Hardion, J. L'Hôtel Goüin: Notice archéologique, Société archéologique de Touraine, Tours (1901) (Gallica)
- Abbot L. Bosseboeuf, Notice historique, avec planches et figures dans le texte, Société archéologique de Touraine, Tours (1901) (Gallica)
