= Alexandre Goüin =

French banker and politician

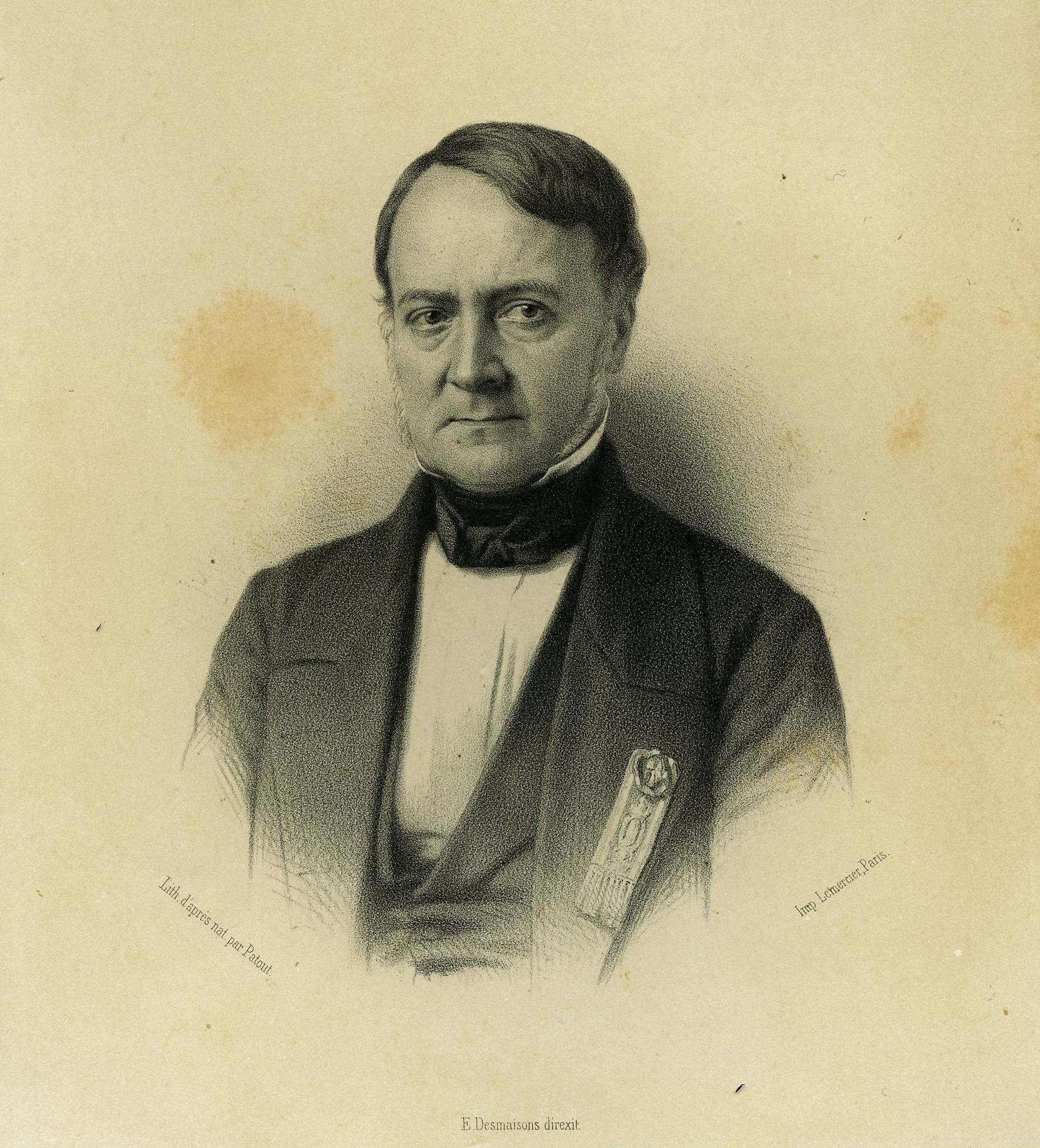

Senator of the Second Empire
- In office 1867-1870

Vice president of Corps législatif

Minister of Commerce and Agriculture
- In office 1840

Deputy for Indre-et-Loire
- In office 1831-1867

Alexandre Henri Goüin (25 January 1792 in Tours – 27 May 1872) was a French banker and politician.

== Life ==
Came from a banker family, he was member of the municipal council of Tours from 1820 on and president of the Tribunal and Chamber of Commerce of Tours.

He was deputy for the department of Indre-et-Loire (1831-1868), president of the General councils of Indre-et-Loire (1834-), minister of Commerce and Agriculture in the government of Louis-Philippe of France (1840), Vice president of Corps législatif and Senator of the Second Empire (1868-1870).

Goüin has director of Caisse générale du commerce et de l'industrie (1844-1848).

He was the father of Eugène Goüin and the uncle of Ernest Goüin.

== See also ==
- Hôtel Goüin
- Minister of Commerce and Industry (France)
- Ministry of Agriculture (France)

Political offices
Preceded by Laurent Cunin-Gridaine	Minister of Commerce and Agriculture; 1840	Succeeded by Laurent Cunin-Gridaine
