= Ernest Goüin =

French civil engineer and industrialist

- Ernest Goüin
- Born: 22 July 1815; Tours
- Died: 24 March 1885 (aged 69); Paris

Ernest Goüin (French pronunciation: [go.ɥɛ̃]; 22 July 1815 in Tours – 24 March 1885 in Paris) was a French civil engineer and industrialist. In 1846 he founded Ernest Goüin & Cie. (after 1871 Société de Construction des Batignolles); the company initially built locomotives, and diversified into bridge building and railway construction projects. His name is one of the 72 names inscribed on the Eiffel Tower.

== Biography ==
Born on 20/22 July 1815, second son of Édouard Goüin, Ernest Goüin came from an established family of distinguished bankers and traders.

He was educated at the École Polytechnique, and had achieved the military rank of major, when in 1836 he resigned his commission and began to training in civil engineering at the École nationale des ponts et chaussées He then studied engineering in England, learning at the railway workshops there, and subsequently was responsible for monitoring the construction of locomotives for the Compagnie du chemin de fer de Paris à Orléans at the workshops of the Sharp Brothers in Manchester.

Between 1839 and 1845 he was manager of a railway workshops in Paris on the Paris to St. Germain line; in 1846 he founded his own company Ernest Gouin et Cie. with backing from James de Rothschild, and began locomotive construction. An economic depression in 1847 affected orders for locomotives and forced Goüin to diversify; as a result his company began manufacturing structural metal constructions, and in 1852 his company built became the first metal bridge builder in France, with a bridge in Asnières.

Later he established a shipyard in Nantes. His company became public in 1871 as Société de Construction des Batignolles, and through it he became involved in railway construction, including crossings of the Pyrenees, Apennines, Carpathians and the Tyrolean Alps, lines in Algeria and Senegal, as well as railway lines in France and Belgium.

He also attained the positions of director of the Banque de France, and chairman of the Conseil de prud'hommes de la Seine, and of the Paris Chamber of Commerce.

He died in 1871; his descendants were involved in the running of the Société de Construction de Batignolles.

== See also ==
- Hôtel Goüin
- Alexandre Goüin, uncle of Ernest Goüin, banker and politician
- Eugène Goüin, son of Ernest Goüin, banker and politician
- Margaret Bridge, designed by Ernest Goüin and Émile Nouguier
