= Mathieu Inthasane =

French footballer (born 1986)

Personal information
- Full name: Mathieu Inthasane
- Date of birth: June 8, 1986 (age 40)
- Place of birth: Tours, France
- Height: 1.83 m (6 ft 0 in)
- Position: Goalkeeper

Team information
- Current team: Sézanne

Senior career*
Years	Team	Apps	(Gls)
2004–2007	Châteauroux	0	(0)
2007–2009	Reims	9	(0)
2009	Cassis Carnoux	10	(0)
2010–2011	Saint-Dizier	21	(0)
2011–	Sézanne	13	(0)
- * Club domestic league appearances and goals as of 12:53, 15 July 2009 (UTC)

Mathieu Inthasane (born June 8, 1986) is a football goalkeeper who currently plays for CFA 2 side Sézanne. He has previously played for Châteauroux, Stade Reims, where he made nine appearances in Ligue 2, Cassis Carnoux and Saint-Dizier.

== See also ==
- Football in France
- List of football clubs in France
