= Tours =

City in Centre-Val de Loire, France

- Prefecture and commune
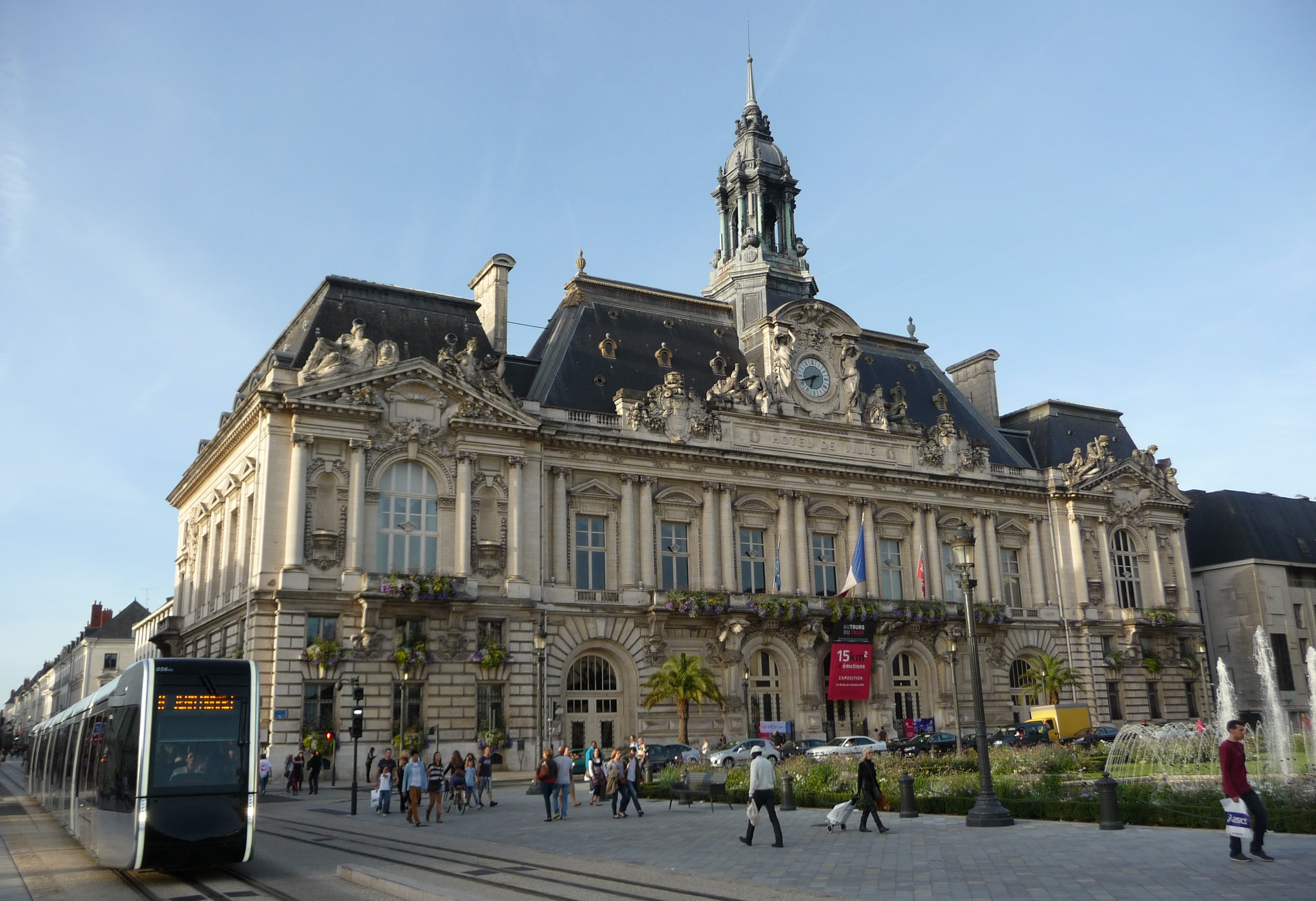
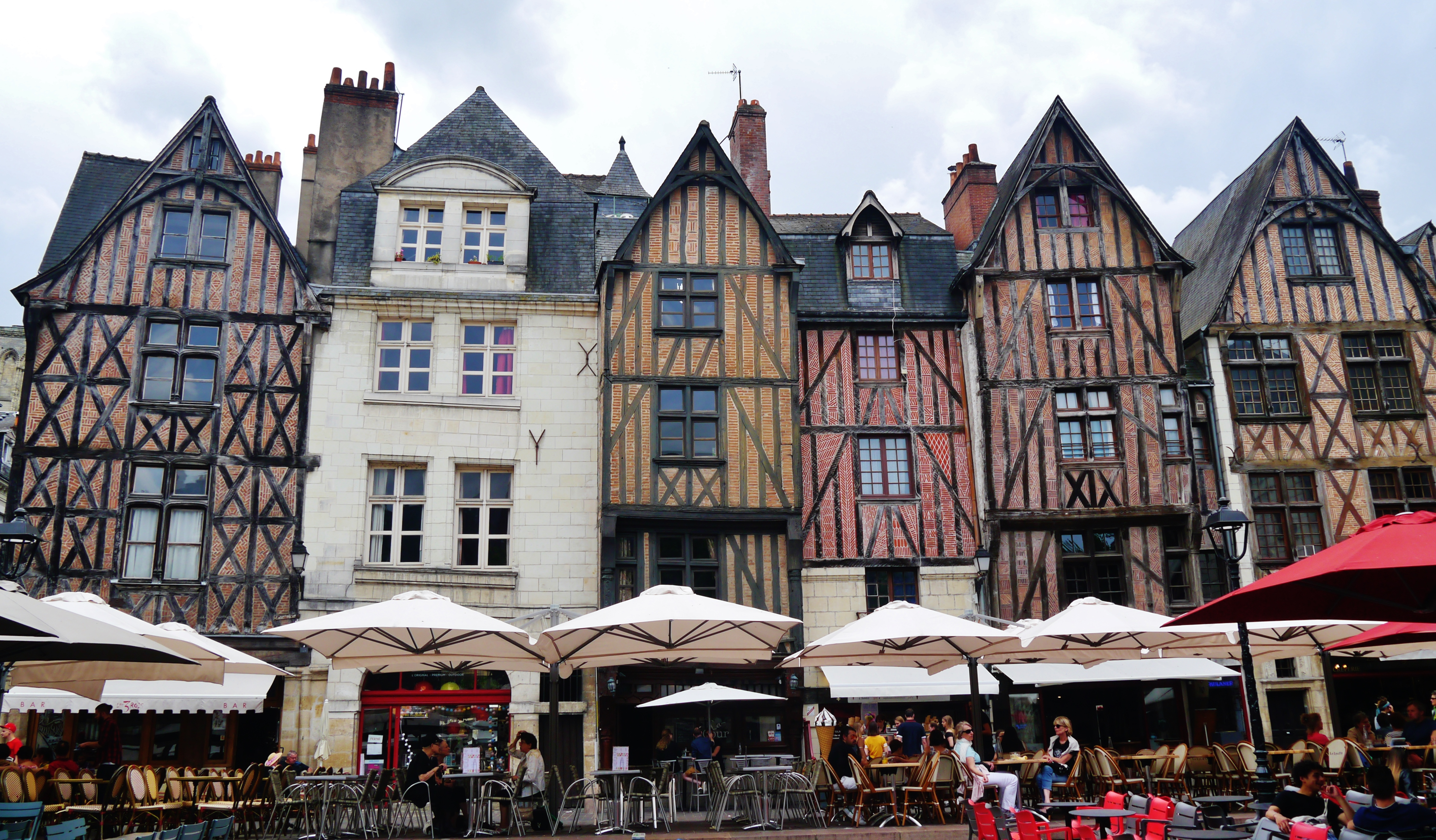
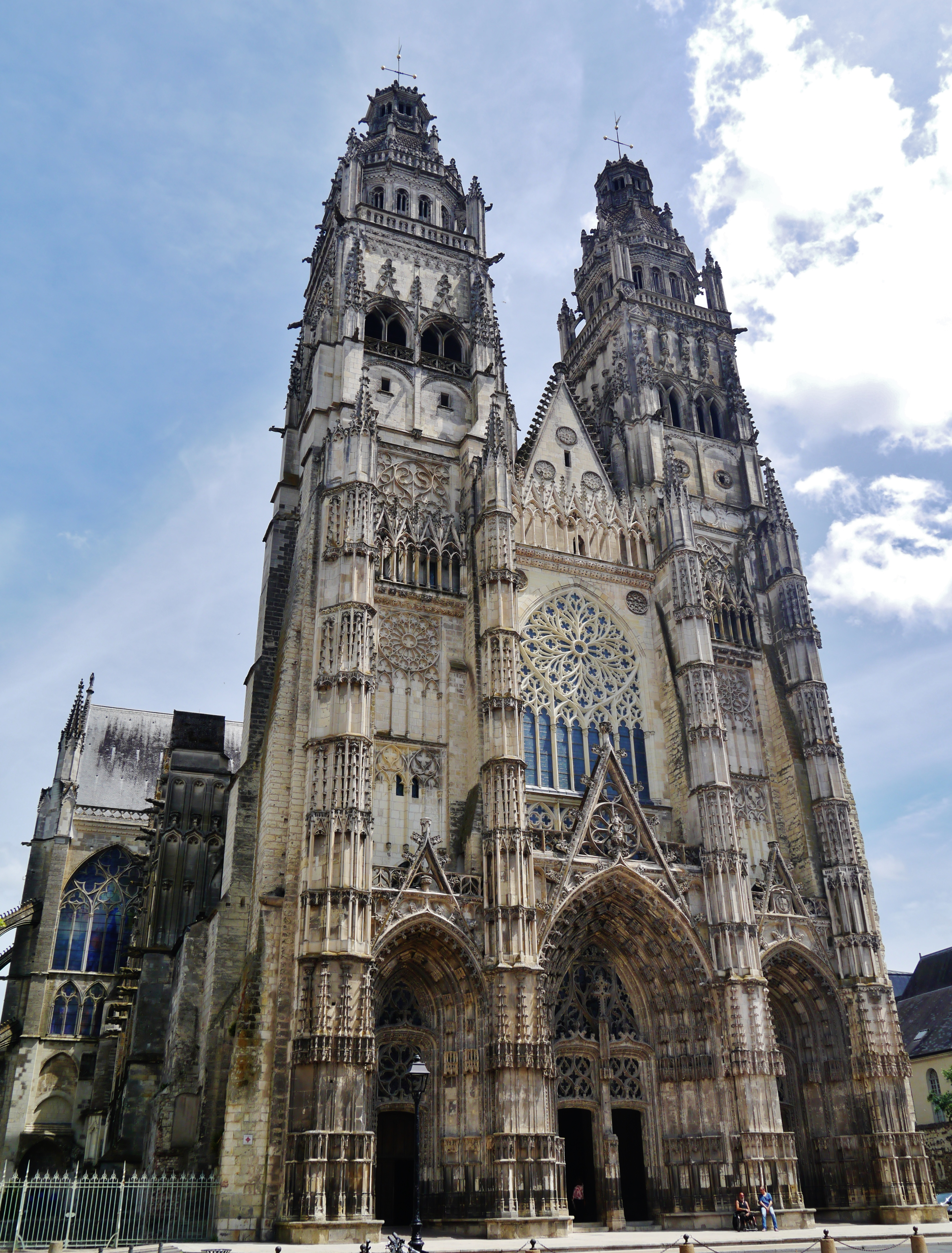
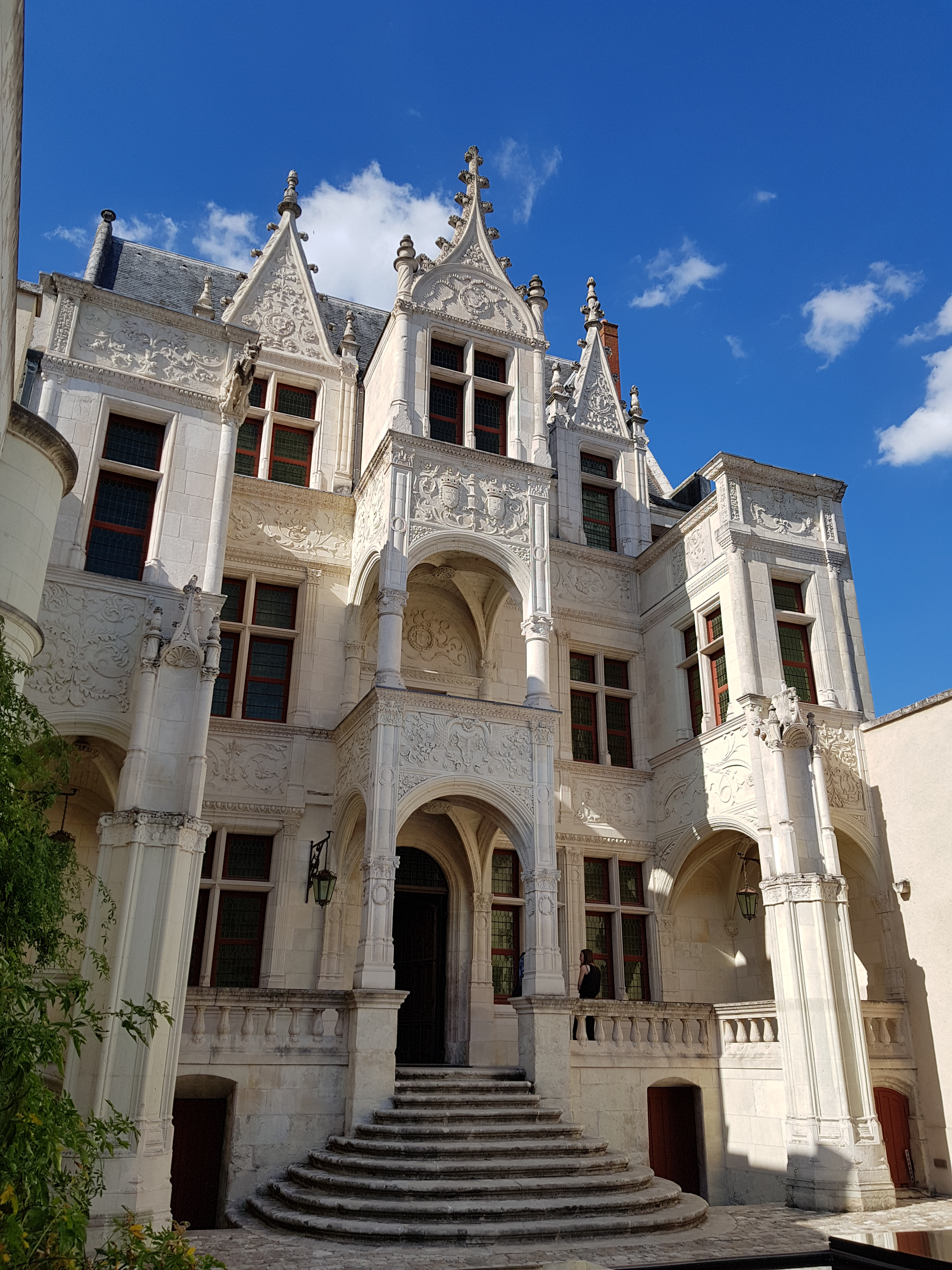
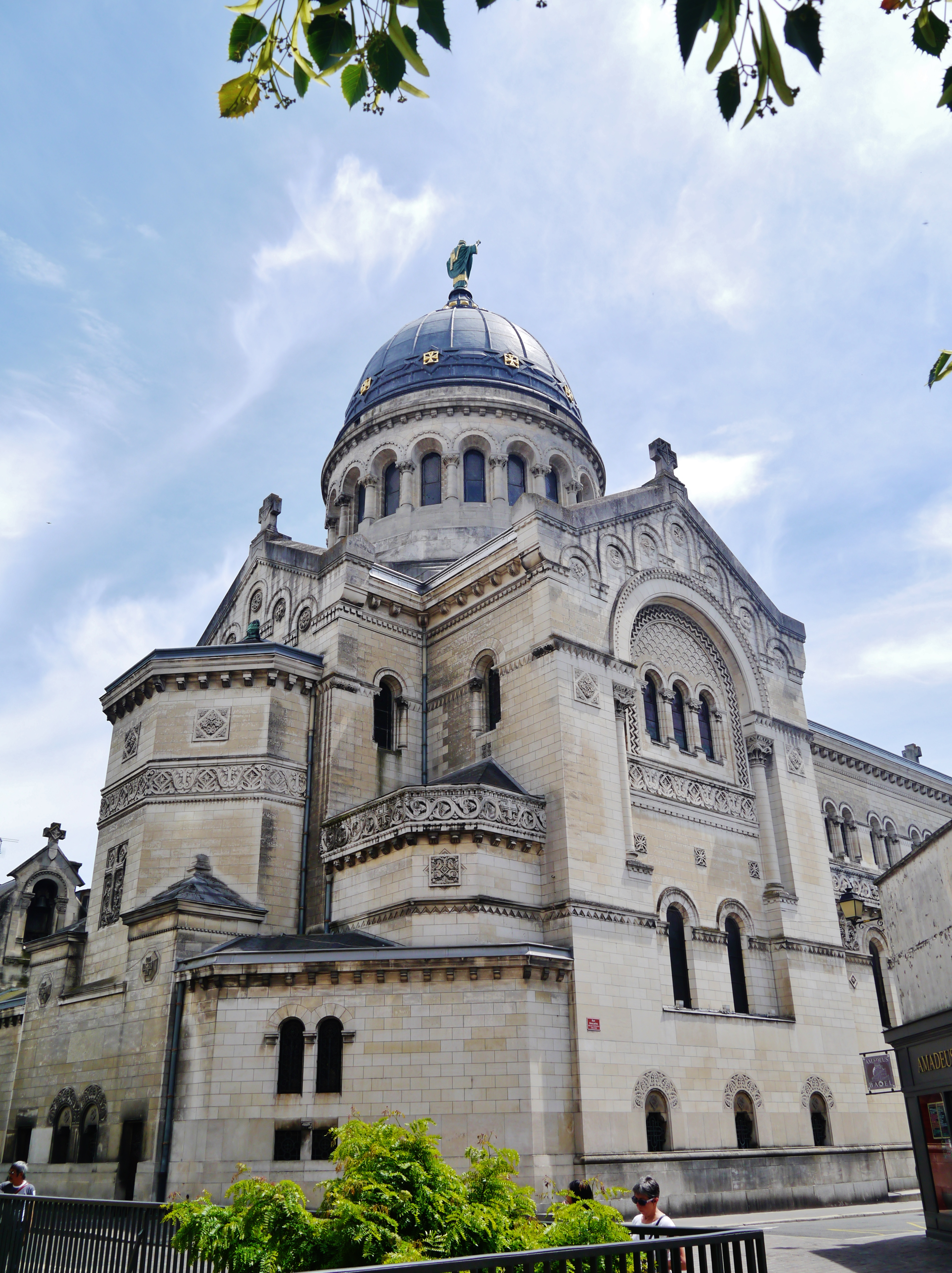
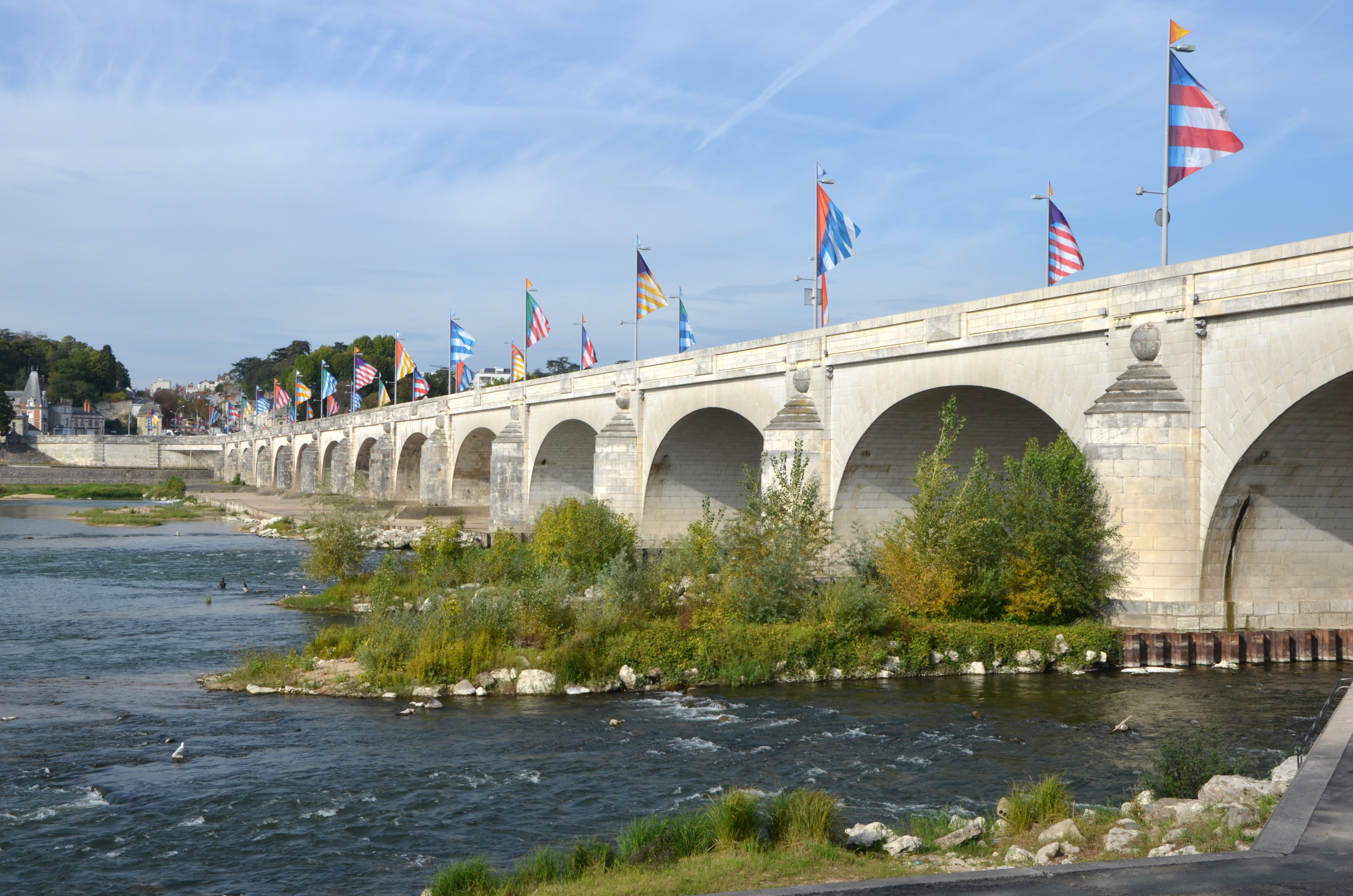
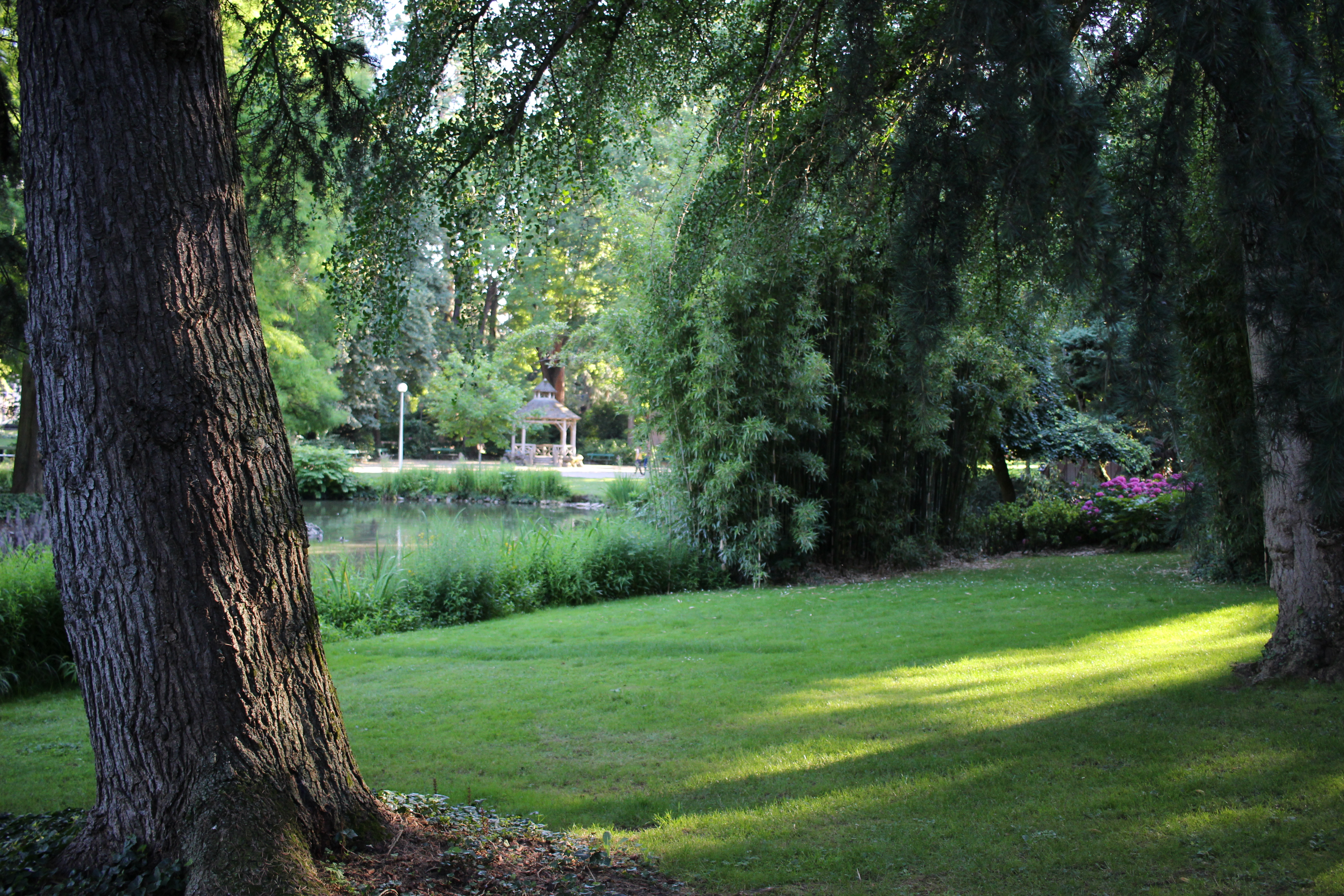
- Hôtel de Ville Medieval buildings on Place Plumereau Tours Cathedral Hôtel Goüin Basilica of Saint Martin Pont Wilson over the Loire Prébendes d'Oé garden

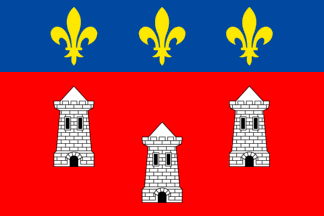
- Flag Coat of arms
- Location of Tours
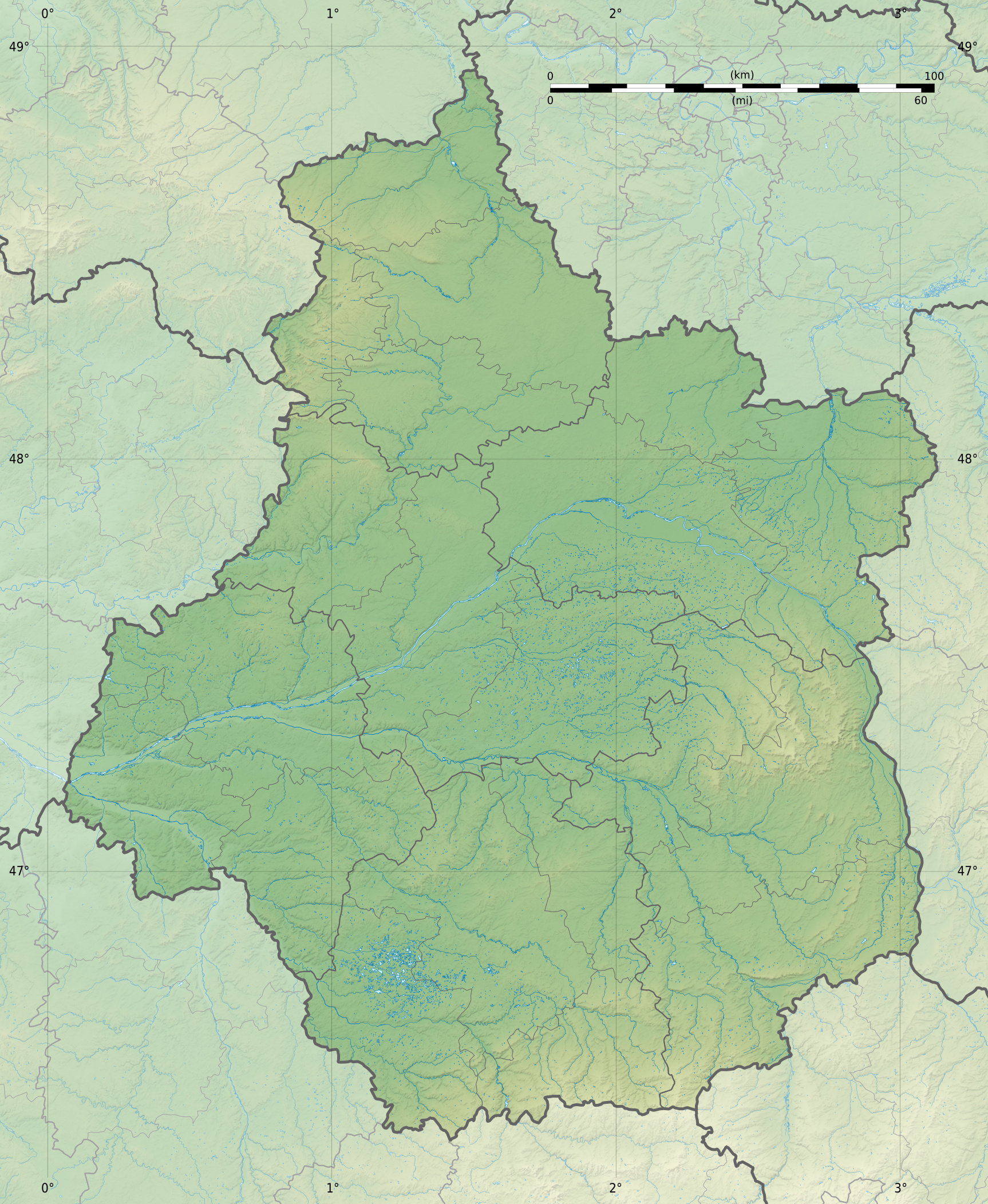
- Location within France Location within Centre-Val de Loire
- Coordinates: 47°23′37″N 0°41′21″E
- Country: France
- Region: Centre-Val de Loire
- Department: Indre-et-Loire
- Arrondissement: Tours
- Canton: Tours-1; Tours-2; Tours-3; Tours-4
- Intercommunality: Tours Métropole Val de Loire

Government
  - Mayor (2026–32): Emmanuel Denis (The Greens)
- Area^{1}: 34.7 km^{2} (13.4 sq mi)
  - Urban (2022): 684.9 km^{2} (264.4 sq mi)
  - Metro (2022): 3,631.6 km^{2} (1,402.2 sq mi)
- Highest elevation: 119 m (390 ft)
- Lowest elevation: 44 m (144 ft)
- Population (2023): 139,259
  - Rank: 26th in France
  - Density: 4,010/km^{2} (10,400/sq mi)
  - Urban (2022): 367,484
  - Urban density: 536.6/km^{2} (1,390/sq mi)
  - Metro (2022): 526,370
  - Metro density: 144.94/km^{2} (375.40/sq mi)
- Demonym(s): Tourangeau (masculine); Tourangelle (feminine)
- Time zone: UTC+01:00 (CET)
  - Summer (DST): UTC+02:00 (CEST)
- INSEE/Postal code: 37261 /37000, 37100, 37200
- ^{1} French Land Register data, which excludes lakes, ponds, glaciers > 1 km^{2} (0.386 sq mi or 247 acres) and river estuaries.

Tours (/tʊər/ TOOR; French: [tuʁ]) is the largest city in the region of Centre-Val de Loire, France. It is the prefecture of the department of Indre-et-Loire. The commune of Tours had 138,668 inhabitants as of 2022 while the population of the whole metropolitan area was 526,370.

Tours sits on the lower reaches of the Loire, between Orléans and the Atlantic coast. Formerly named Caesarodunum by its founder, Roman Emperor Augustus, it possesses one of the largest amphitheaters of the Roman Empire, the Tours Amphitheatre. Known for the Battle of Tours in 732 AD, it is a National Sanctuary with connections to the Merovingians and the Carolingians, with the Capetians making the kingdom's currency the Livre tournois. Saint Martin and Gregory of Tours were from Tours. Tours was once part of Touraine, a former province of France. Tours was the first city of the silk industry. It was taken by Louis XI, as the royal capital under the Valois Kings with its Loire castles and city of art with the School of Tours. The prefecture was partially destroyed during the French Wars of Religion in the late 16th century and again during the Second World War in June 1940.

The historical centre of Tours is listed as a UNESCO World Heritage Site, and the city is also home to the Vieux-Tours, a patrimonial site. The garden city has a green heritage and its urban landscape has been strongly influenced by its natural space. The historic city is nicknamed the "White and Blue City" and "Le Petit Paris". The city is a university city with more than 30,000 students in 2019. Tours is a popular culinary city with specialties such as rillettes, rillons, Touraine vineyards, AOC Sainte-Maure-de-Touraine cheeses and nougats. The city is also the end-point of the annual Paris–Tours cycle race. The region, due to its history and culture, has always been a place of birth or home to many personalities and international sporting events.

== Etymology ==
A popular folk etymology of the word "Tours" is that it comes from Turonus, the nephew of Brutus. Turonus died in a war between Corineus and the king of Aquitaine, Goffarius Pictus, provoked by Corineus hunting in the king's forests without permission. It is said that Turonus was buried in Tours and the city is founded around his grave.

== History ==
In Gallic times, Tours was an important crossing point over the Loire. It became part of the Roman Empire during the 1st century AD, and the city was named Caesarodunum ("hill of Caesar"). The name evolved in the 4th century when the original Gallic name, Turones, became Civitas Turonum and then Tours. It was at this time that the Tours Amphitheatre was built.

Tours became a metropolis in the Roman province of Lugdunum towards 380–388 AD, dominating Maine, Brittany, and the Loire Valley. One important figure in the city was Saint Martin of Tours, a bishop who shared his coat with a naked beggar in Amiens. The importance of Martin in the medieval Christian West made Tours, and its position on the route of pilgrimage to Santiago de Compostela, a major centre during the Middle Ages.

=== Middle Ages ===
In the 6th century, Gregory of Tours, author of the Ten Books of History, restored a cathedral destroyed by a fire in 561. Saint Martin's monastery benefited from its inception, at the very start of the 6th century from patronage and support from the Frankish king, Clovis I, which increased considerably the influence of the saint, the abbey and the city in Gaul. In the 9th century, Tours was at the heart of the Carolingian Renaissance, in particular because of Alcuin, of York in Northumbria, a renowned book collector and an abbot of Marmoutier Abbey.

In 732, Abdul Rahman Al Ghafiqi and an army of Muslim horsemen from Al-Andalus advanced 500 kilometres (300 miles) deep into France, and were stopped at the Battle of Tours at Moussais-la-Bataille (between Châtellerault and Poitiers) by Charles Martel and his infantry. The Muslim army was defeated, preventing an Islamic conquest of France.

In 845, Tours repelled the first attack of the Viking chief Haesten. In 850, the Vikings settled at the mouths of the Seine and the Loire. Still led by Haesten, they went up the Loire again in 852 and sacked Angers, Tours and Marmoutier Abbey.

During the Middle Ages, Tours consisted of two juxtaposed and competing centres. The "City" in the east, successor of the late Roman 'castrum', was composed of the cathedral and palace of the archbishops as well as the castle of Tours. The castle of Tours acted as a seat of the authority of the Counts of Tours (later Counts of Anjou) and the King of France. In the west, the "new city" structured around the Abbey of Saint Martin was freed from the control of the city during the 10th century (an enclosure was built towards 918) and became "Châteauneuf". This space, organized between Saint Martin and the Loire, became the economic centre of Tours. Between these two centres were Varennes, vineyards and fields, little occupied except for the Abbaye Saint-Julien established on the banks of the Loire. The two centres were linked during the 14th century.

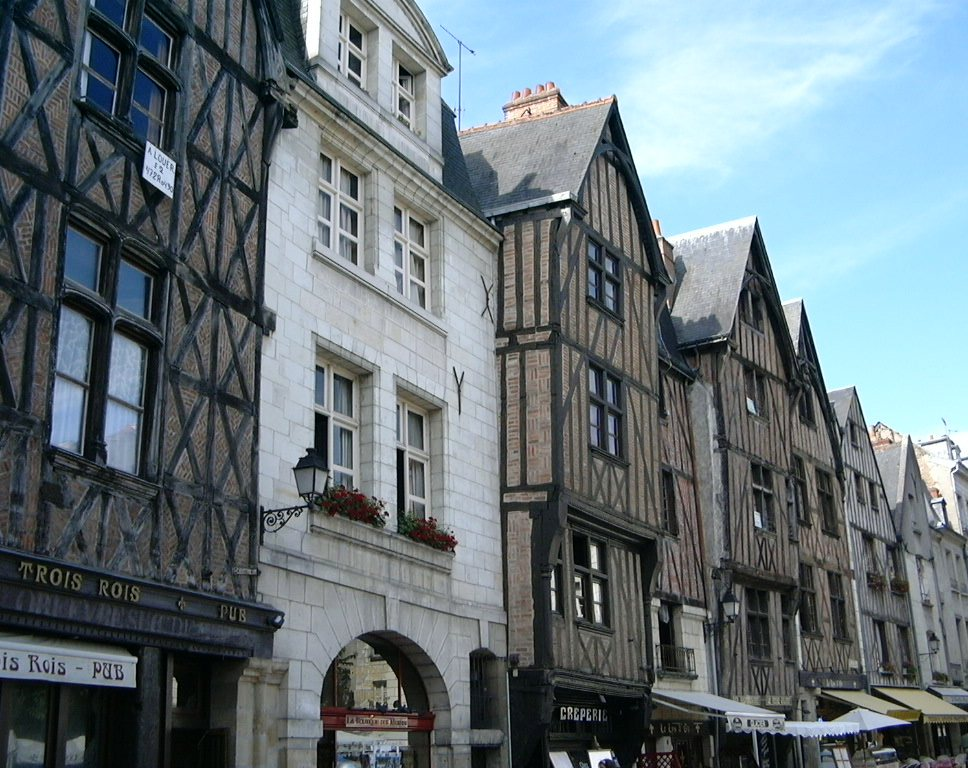
Place Plumereau, Medieval buildings

Tours became the capital of the county of Tours or Touraine, a territory bitterly disputed between the counts of Blois and Anjou – the latter were victorious in the 11th century. It was the capital of France at the time of Louis XI, who had settled in the castle of Montils (today the castle of Plessis-les-Tours, at the junction of the Loire and the Indre rivers). Tours and Touraine remained a permanent residence of the kings and court until the 16th century. The Renaissance gave Tours and Touraine many private mansions and castles, joined to some extent under the generic name of the Châteaux of the Loire. It is also at the time of Louis XI that the silk industry was introduced – despite difficulties, the industry still survives to this day.

=== 16th–18th centuries ===
Charles IX passed through the city at the time of his royal tour of France between 1564 and 1566, accompanied by the Court and various noblemen: his brother the Duke of Anjou, Henri de Navarre, the cardinals of Bourbon and Lorraine. At this time, the Catholics returned to power in Angers: the attendant assumed the right to nominate the aldermen. The Massacre of Saint-Barthelemy was not repeated at Tours. The Protestants were imprisoned by the aldermen – a measure which prevented their extermination. The permanent return of the Court to Paris and then Versailles marked the beginning of a slow but permanent decline. Guillaume the Metayer (1763–1798), known as Rochambeau, the well-known counter-revolutionary chief of Mayenne, was shot in Tours.

=== 19th to 20th centuries ===
The arrival of the railway in the 19th century saved the city by making it an important nodal point. The main railway station is known as Tours-Saint-Pierre-des-Corps. At that time, Tours was expanding towards the south into a district known as the Prébendes. The importance of the city as a centre of communications contributed to its revival and, as the 20th century progressed, Tours became a dynamic conurbation, economically oriented towards the service sector. The city was briefly the de facto capital of France during the Franco-Prussian War playing host to Léon Gambetta and representatives of the Government of National Defence who escaped the then ongoing Siege of Paris.

==== First World War ====
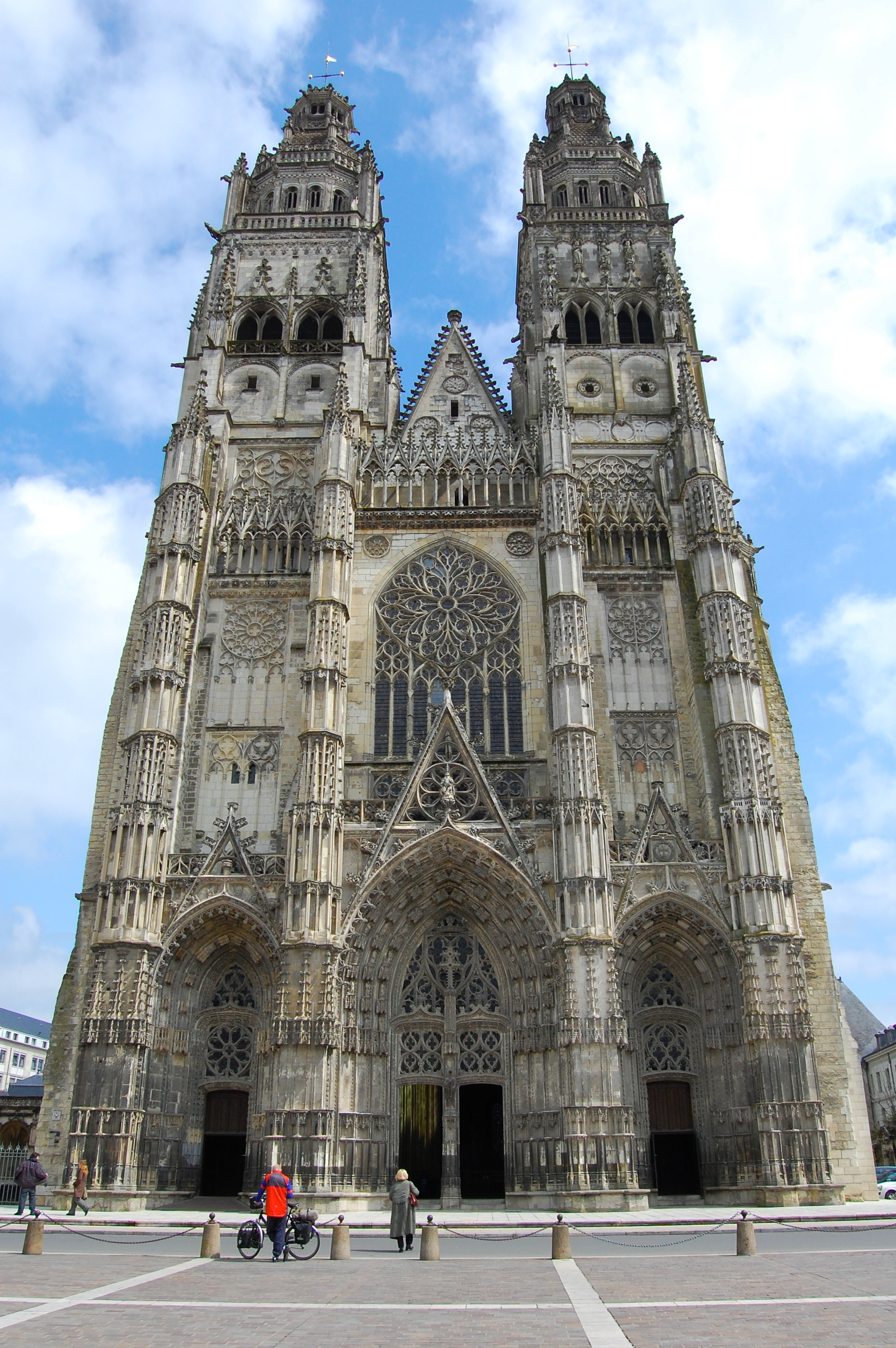
Tours Cathedral: 15th-century Flamboyant Gothic west front with Renaissance pinnacles, completed 1547

The city was greatly affected by the First World War. A force of 25,000 American soldiers arrived in 1917, setting up textile factories for the manufacture of uniforms, repair shops for military equipment, munitions dumps, an army post office and an American military hospital at Augustins. Because of this, Tours became a garrison town with a resident general staff. The American presence is remembered today by the Wilson Bridge over the Loire, which was officially opened in July 1918 and bears the name of the President of the United States from 1913 to 1921. Three American air force squadrons, including the 492nd, were based at the Parçay-Meslay airfield, their personnel playing an active part in the life of the city. Americans paraded at funerals and award ceremonies for the Croix de Guerre. They also took part in festivals and their YMCA organised shows for the troops. Some men married women from Tours.

==== Inter-war years ====
In 1920, the city hosted the Congress of Tours, which saw the creation of the French Communist Party. One future consequence of that congress was the presence of Ho Chi Minh, the Vietnamese nationalist, who became one of the first members of the party.

==== Second World War ====
Tours was also marked by the Second World War, as the city suffered massive destruction in 1940. For four years it was a city of military camps and fortifications. From 10 to 13 June 1940, Tours was the temporary seat of the French government before its move to Bordeaux.

German incendiary bombs caused a huge fire, which blazed out of control from 20 to 22 June and destroyed part of the city centre. Some architectural masterpieces of the 16th and 17th centuries were lost, as was the monumental entry to the city. The Wilson Bridge, which carried a water main that supplied the city, was dynamited to slow the progress of the German advance. With the water main severed, nobody could extinguish the inferno. That made inhabitants have no option but to flee to safety. More heavy air raids by Allied forces devastated the area around the railway station in 1944, causing several hundred deaths.

==== Post-war developments ====
A plan for the rebuilding of the central area drawn up by the local architect Camille Lefèvre had been adopted even before the end of the war. The plan was for 20 small quadrangular blocks of housing to be arranged around the main road (la rue Nationale), which was widened. This regular layout attempted to echo but simplify the 18th-century architecture. Pierre Patout succeeded Lefèvre as the architect in charge of rebuilding in 1945. At one time, there was talk of demolishing the southern side of the rue Nationale to make it in keeping with the new development.

The recent history of Tours is marked by the personality of Jean Royer, who was mayor for 36 years and helped save the old town from demolition by establishing one of the first Conservation Areas. This example of conservation policy would later inspire the Malraux Law for the safeguarding of historic city centres. In the 1970s, Jean Royer also extended the city to the south by diverting the course of the Cher River to create the districts of Rives du Cher and des Fontaines. At the time, it was one of the largest urban developments in Europe. In 1970, the François Rabelais University was founded and centred on the bank of the Loire in the downtown area, not, as was the current practice, in a campus in the suburbs. The latter solution was also chosen by the twin university of Orleans. Royer's long term as mayor was, however, not without controversy, as is exemplified by the construction of the practical but aesthetically unattractive motorway, which runs along the bed of a former canal just 1,500 metres (4,900 feet) from the cathedral. Another bone of contention was the original Vinci Congress Centre by Jean Nouvel. The project incurred debts although it at least made Tours one of France's principal conference centres.

Jean Germain, a member of the Socialist Party, became mayor in 1995 and made debt reduction his priority. Ten years later, his economic management was regarded as much wiser than that of his predecessor because of the financial stability of the city returning. However, his achievements were criticised by the municipal opposition for a lack of ambition. There were no large building projects instituted under his two terms. That position is disputed by those in power, who affirm their policy of concentrating on the quality of life, as evidenced by urban restoration, the development of public transport and cultural activities.

== Climate ==
Tours has an oceanic climate that is mild for such a northern latitude. Summers are influenced by its inland position, resulting in frequent days of 25 °C (77 °F) or warmer, whereas winters are kept mild by Atlantic air masses. The entire valley between Orléans and Angers is famous for its fabulous châteaux, most of them Renaissance (over 600 between Orléans and Angers).

Climate data for Tours, elevation: 108 m (354 ft) (1991–2020 normals, extremes 1959-present)
Month	Jan	Feb	Mar	Apr	May	Jun	Jul	Aug	Sep	Oct	Nov	Dec	Year
Record high °C (°F)	16.9 (62.4)	22.1 (71.8)	25.3 (77.5)	29.2 (84.6)	33.7 (92.7)	41.4 (106.5)	40.8 (105.4)	40.0 (104.0)	35.5 (95.9)	31.1 (88.0)	22.3 (72.1)	18.5 (65.3)	41.4 (106.5)
Mean daily maximum °C (°F)	7.7 (45.9)	9.0 (48.2)	12.9 (55.2)	16.0 (60.8)	19.6 (67.3)	23.4 (74.1)	25.9 (78.6)	26.0 (78.8)	22.1 (71.8)	17.0 (62.6)	11.4 (52.5)	8.1 (46.6)	16.6 (61.9)
Daily mean °C (°F)	5.1 (41.2)	5.6 (42.1)	8.6 (47.5)	11.0 (51.8)	14.5 (58.1)	18.0 (64.4)	20.2 (68.4)	20.2 (68.4)	16.8 (62.2)	13.0 (55.4)	8.3 (46.9)	5.5 (41.9)	12.2 (54.0)
Mean daily minimum °C (°F)	2.5 (36.5)	2.3 (36.1)	4.3 (39.7)	6.0 (42.8)	9.4 (48.9)	12.6 (54.7)	14.4 (57.9)	14.3 (57.7)	11.4 (52.5)	9.0 (48.2)	5.3 (41.5)	2.9 (37.2)	7.9 (46.2)
Record low °C (°F)	−17.4 (0.7)	−14.2 (6.4)	−10.3 (13.5)	−3.4 (25.9)	−0.6 (30.9)	2.6 (36.7)	4.3 (39.7)	4.8 (40.6)	0.9 (33.6)	−2.3 (27.9)	−7.1 (19.2)	−18.5 (−1.3)	−18.5 (−1.3)
Average precipitation mm (inches)	63.0 (2.48)	52.4 (2.06)	48.7 (1.92)	53.0 (2.09)	57.7 (2.27)	53.2 (2.09)	46.6 (1.83)	44.0 (1.73)	51.8 (2.04)	66.0 (2.60)	69.3 (2.73)	72.1 (2.84)	677.8 (26.69)
Average precipitation days (≥ 1.0 mm)	11.0	9.8	9.3	8.9	9.0	7.6	6.7	6.6	7.5	9.8	11.4	11.5	109.0
Average relative humidity (%)	88	83	76	72	74	70	67	67	73	83	88	89	78
Average dew point °C (°F)	3 (37)	3 (37)	4 (39)	6 (43)	9 (48)	12 (54)	13 (55)	13 (55)	11 (52)	10 (50)	6 (43)	4 (39)	8 (46)
Mean monthly sunshine hours	68.4	95.2	148.8	187.3	214.2	228.5	247.1	237.7	191.3	122.9	78.9	64.6	1,884.8
Source 1: Meteociel
Source 2: Time and Date

== Sights ==
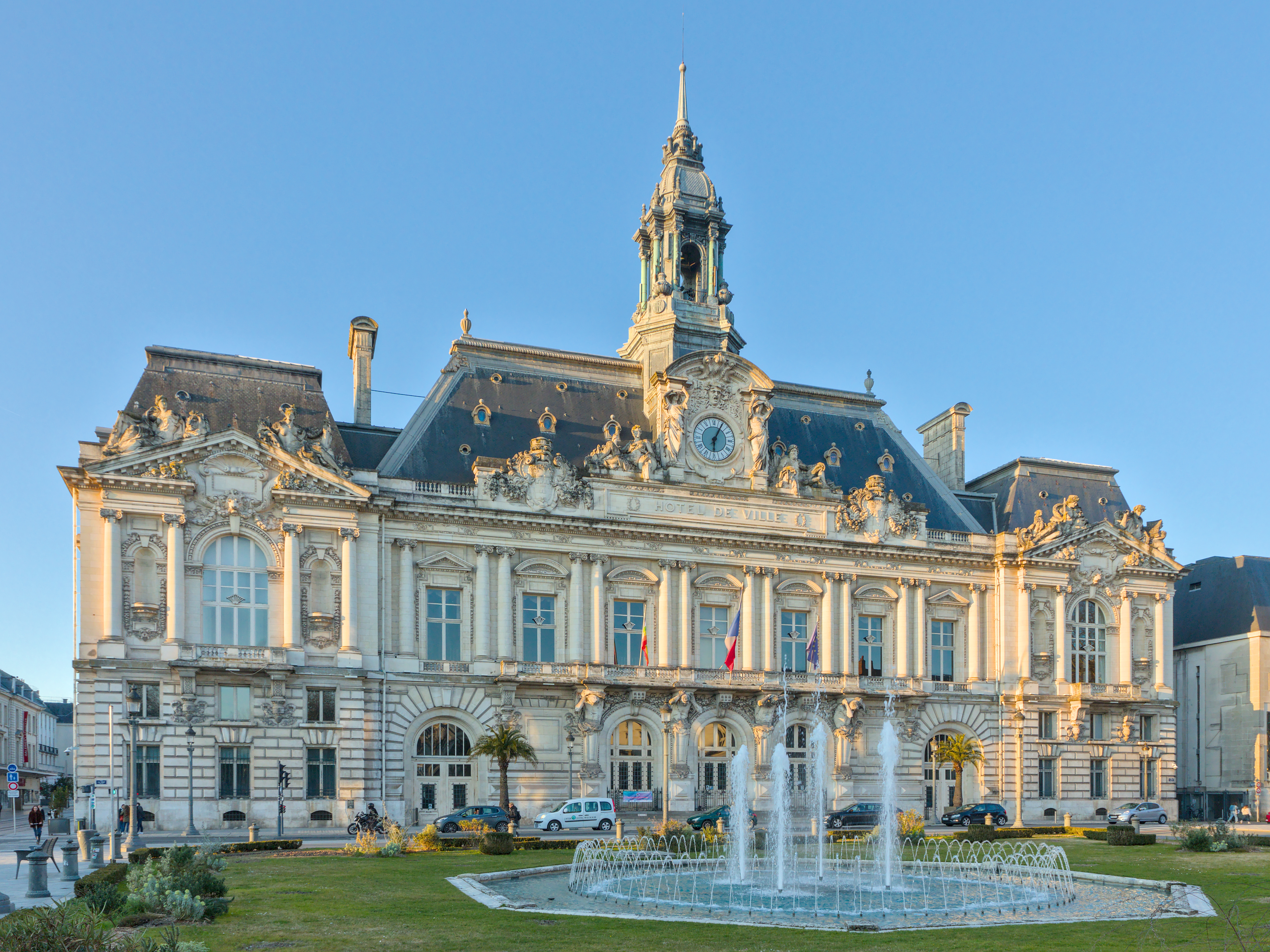
Hôtel de Ville, Place Jean Jaurès

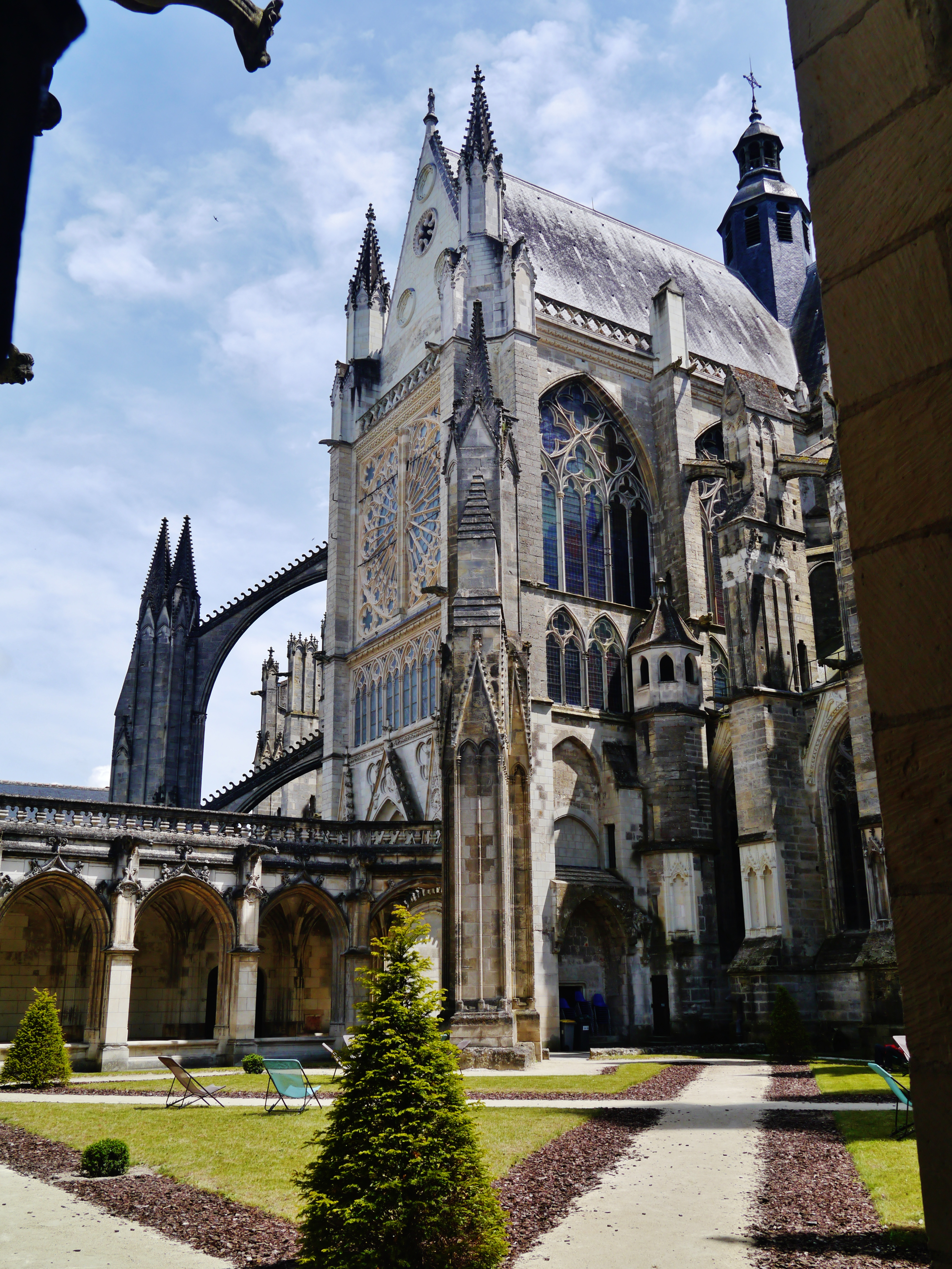
North transept of Saint-Gatien Cathedral, seen from the cloister.

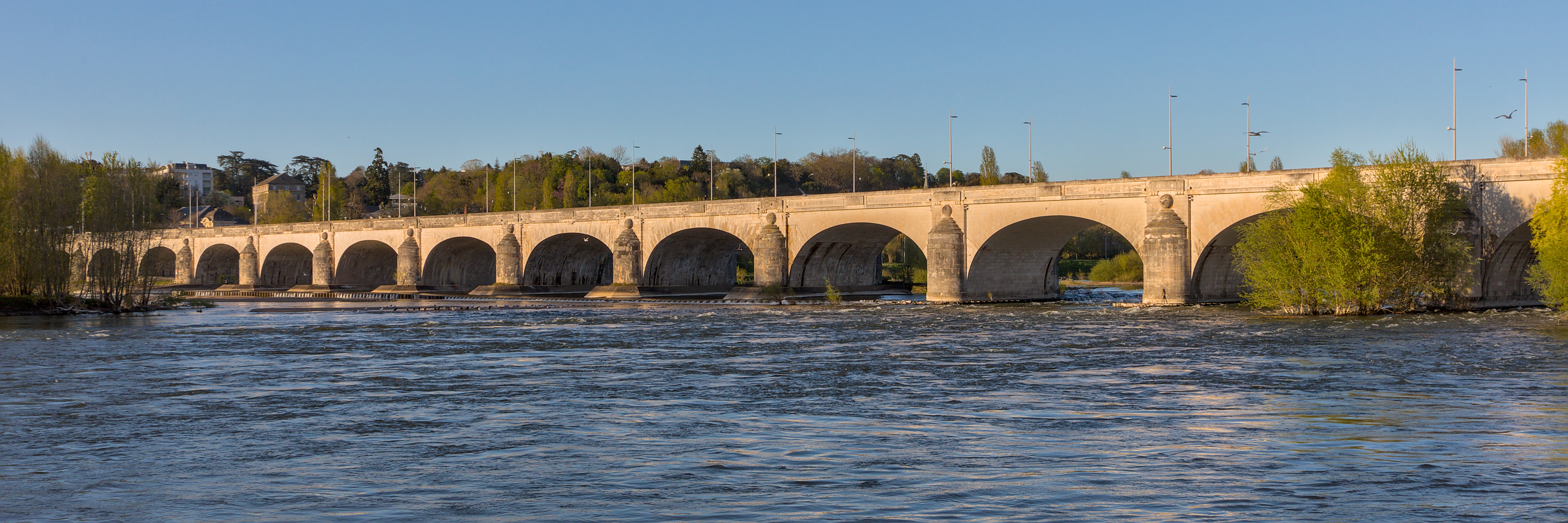
Pont Wilson

=== Cathedral ===
The Cathedral of Tours, dedicated to Saint Gatien, its canonized first bishop, was begun about 1170 to replace the cathedral that was burnt out in 1166 during the dispute between Louis VII of France and Henry II of England. The lowermost stages of the western towers belong to the 12th century, but the rest of the west end is in the profusely detailed 15th-century Flamboyant Gothic, which were completed just as the Renaissance was affecting the patrons who planned the châteaux of Touraine. The towers were being constructed at the same time as, for example, the Château de Chenonceau.

When the 15th-century illuminator Jean Fouquet was set the task of illuminating Josephus's Jewish Antiquities, his depiction of Solomon's Temple was modelled on the nearly complete cathedral of Tours. The atmosphere of the Gothic cathedral close permeates Honoré de Balzac's dark short novel of jealousy and provincial intrigues, Le Curé de Tours (The Curate of Tours) and his medieval story Maître Cornélius opens in the cathedral itself.

=== Other points of interest ===
- Hôtel de Ville
- Jardin botanique de Tours, the municipal botanical garden
- Medieval enclosure at Tours
- Musée des Beaux-Arts de Tours
- Hôtel Goüin
- Château de Tours
- Basilique St-Martin
- Place Plumereau, the old town
- Grand Théâtre, housing the Opéra de Tours
- Tour Charlemagne

== Language ==
Before the French Revolution, the inhabitants of Tours (Les Tourangeaux) were known for speaking the "purest" form of French in the entire country. The pronunciation of Touraine was traditionally regarded as the most standard pronunciation of the French language, until the 19th century when the standard pronunciation of French shifted to that of the Parisian bourgeoisie. That is explained by the fact that the court of France lived in Touraine between 1430 and 1530. French, the language of the court, had become the official language of the entire kingdom.

A Council of Tours in 813 decided that priests should preach sermons in different languages because the common people could no longer understand classical Latin. This was the first official recognition of an early French language distinct from Latin, and can be considered as the birth of French.

The Ordinance of Montils-lès-Tours, promulgated by Charles VII in 1454, made it mandatory to write laws and oral customs in the native language of the area.

An ordinance of Charles VIII (born in Amboise, near Tours) in 1490 and one of Louis XII (born in Blois, near Tours) in 1510 broaden the scope of the ordinance of Charles VII.

Finally, the Ordinance of Villers-Cotterêts, signed into law by Francis I in 1539, called for the use of French in all legal acts, notarized contracts and official legislation to avoid any linguistic confusion.

Gregory of Tours wrote in the 6th century that some people in the area could still speak Gaulish.

== City ==
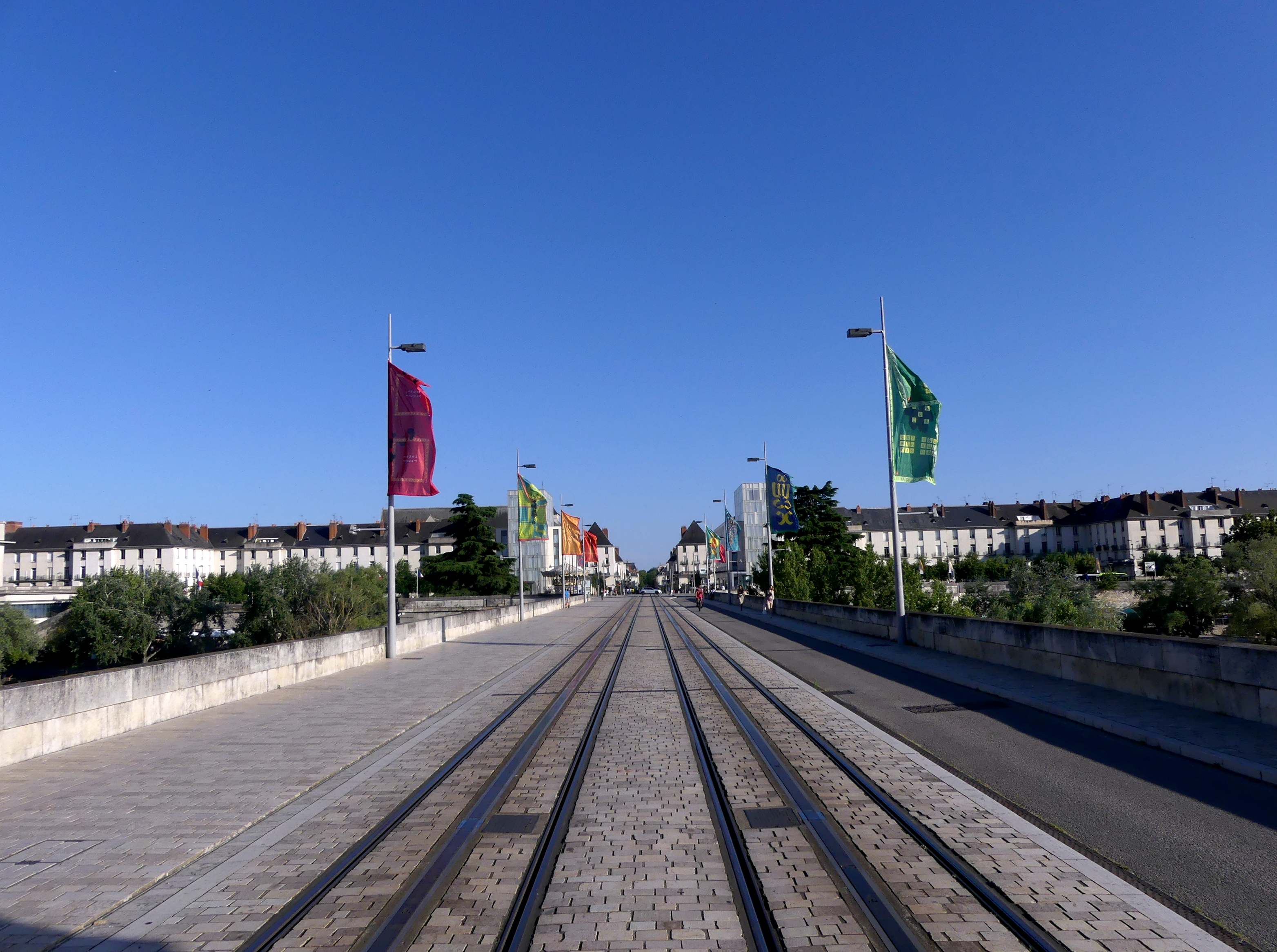
Pont Wilson crosses the river Loire at the old civic core.

The city has a population of 140,000 and is called "Le Jardin de la France" ("The Garden of France"). There are several parks located within the city. Tours is located between two rivers, the Loire to the north and the Cher to the south. The buildings of Tours are white with blue slate (called Ardoise) roofs; this style is common in the north of France, while most buildings in the south of France have terracotta roofs.

Tours is famous for its original medieval district, called le Vieux Tours. Unique to the Old City are its preserved half-timbered buildings and la Place Plumereau, a square with busy pubs and restaurants, whose open-air tables fill the centre of the square. The Boulevard Beranger crosses the Rue Nationale at the Place Jean-Jaures and is the location of weekly markets and fairs.

Tours is famous for its many bridges crossing the river Loire. One of them, Wilson Bridge, collapsed in 1978 but was rebuilt.

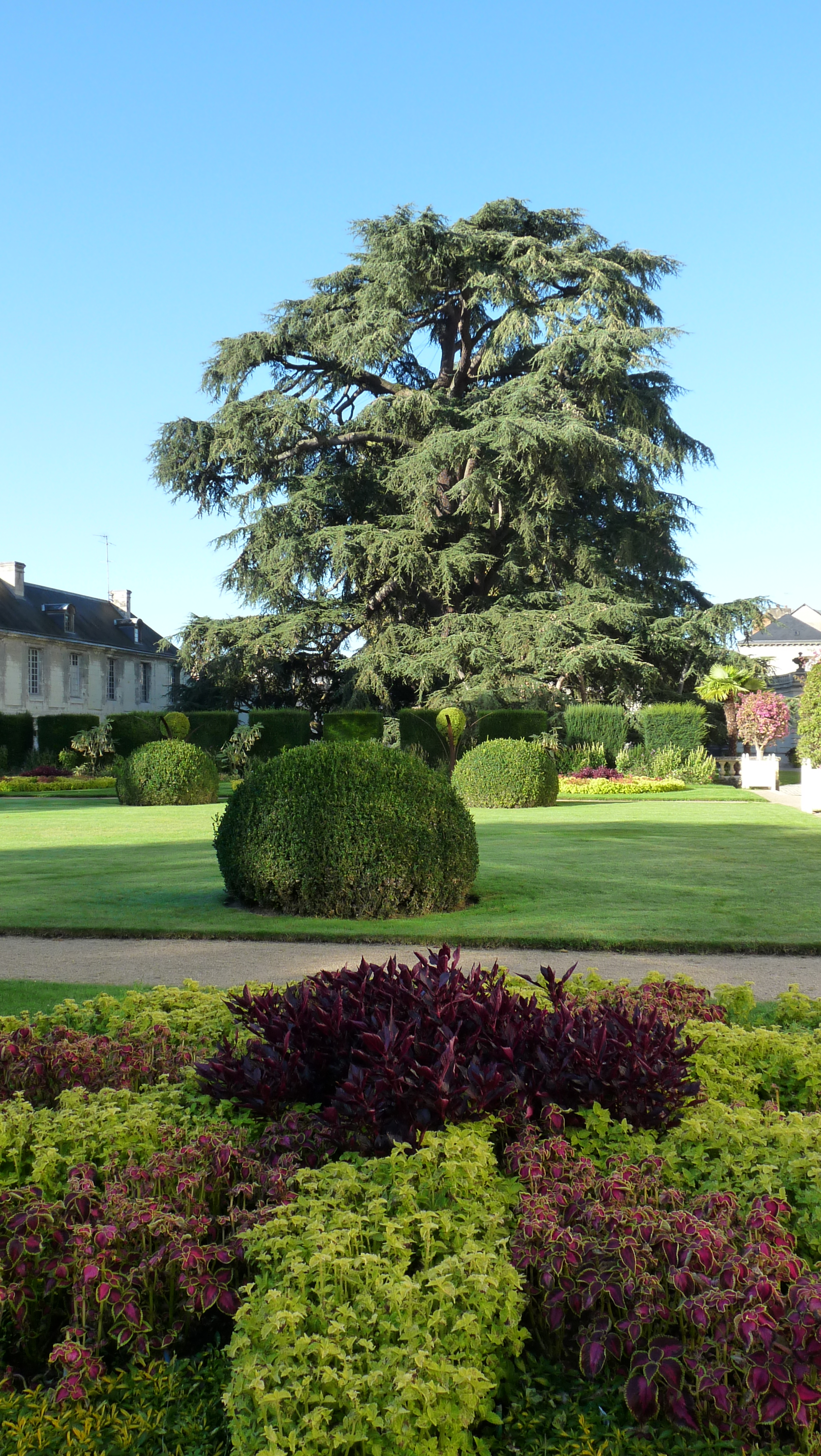
Giant cedar of Lebanon tree

In the garden of the ancient Palais des Archevêques (now Musée des Beaux-Arts) is a huge cedar tree said to have been planted by Napoleon. The garden also has a stuffed elephant named Fritz. He escaped from the Barnum and Bailey circus during their stay in Tours in 1902. He went mad and had to be shot down, but the city paid to honor him, and he was taxidermied as a result.

Tours is home to University of Tours (formerly known as University François Rabelais of Tours), the site of one of the most important choral competitions, called Florilège Vocal de Tours International Choir Competition, and is a member city of the European Grand Prix for Choral Singing.

== Population ==
The population data in the table and graph below refer to the commune of Tours proper, in its geography at the given years. The commune of Tours absorbed the former commune of Saint-Étienne in 1845 and Sainte-Radegonde-en-Touraine and Saint-Symphorien in 1964.

Historical population

Year	Pop.	±% p.a.
1793	21,000	—
1800	20,240	−0.53%
1806	21,703	+1.17%
1821	21,928	+0.07%
1831	23,235	+0.58%
1836	26,669	+2.80%
1841	30,072	+2.43%
1846	30,766	+0.46%
1851	33,530	+1.74%
1856	38,055	+2.56%
1861	41,061	+1.53%
1866	42,450	+0.67%
1872	43,368	+0.36%
1876	48,325	+2.74%
1881	52,209	+1.56%
1886	59,585	+2.68%
1891	60,335	+0.25%
1896	63,267	+0.95%
1901	64,695	+0.45%

Year	Pop.	±% p.a.
1906	67,601	+0.88%
1911	73,398	+1.66%
1921	75,096	+0.23%
1926	77,192	+0.55%
1931	78,585	+0.36%
1936	83,753	+1.28%
1946	80,044	−0.45%
1954	83,618	+0.55%
1962	92,944	+1.33%
1968	128,120	+5.50%
1975	140,686	+1.35%
1982	132,209	−0.88%
1990	129,509	−0.26%
1999	132,820	+0.28%
2007	136,578	+0.35%
2012	134,978	−0.24%
2017	135,787	+0.12%
2023	139,259	+0.42%

Source: EHESS and INSEE (1968–2023)

== Transportation ==
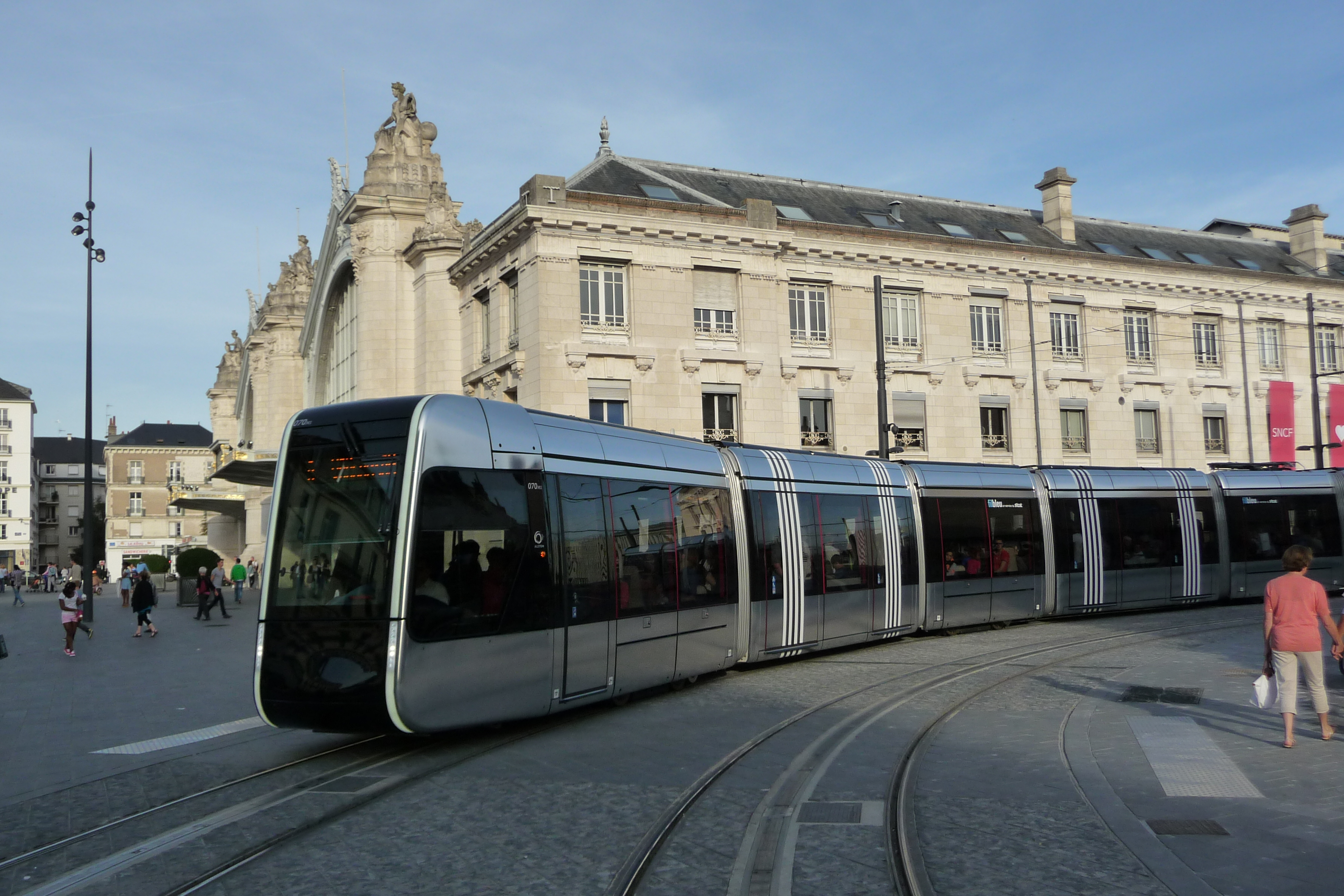
Tramway of tours near Tours railway station, designed by the French agency RCP Design Global

Today, with extensive rail (including TGV) and autoroute connections linking to the rest of the country, Tours is a jumping-off point for tourist visits to the Loire Valley and the royal châteaux.

Tours is on one of the main lines of the TGV. It is possible to travel to the west coast of Bordeaux in an hour and forty minutes. From there, the line follows the Mediterranean coast via Avignon, and then to Spain and Barcelona. There are also lines to Lyon, Strasbourg and Lille. It takes less than one hour by train to get from Tours to Paris by TGV and one and a half hours to get to Charles de Gaulle Airport. Tours has two main stations: Gare de Tours, the central station, and Gare de Saint-Pierre-des-Corps, used by trains that do not terminate in Tours.

Tours Loire Valley Airport connects the Loire Valley to European cities.

Historically, Tours was served by trams and trolleybuses, the trolleybus system lasting from 1949 to 1968. Tram service returned to the city in 2013, when a new tram system began operation. Twenty-one Alstom Citadis trams were ordered.

There is also a bus service, the main central stop being Jean Jaurès, next to the Hôtel de Ville, and rue Nationale, the high street of Tours. The tram and bus networks are operated by Fil Bleu and they share a ticketing system. A second tram line is scheduled for 2025.

== Sport ==
The city's premier football club, Tours FC, was dissolved in 2025, after 106 years of activity, due to years of financial struggles. They also have a second team, CCSP Tours. CCSP's home stadium is the Stade des Tourettes and they play in the Division d'Honneur Regionale de Centre, the seventh tier of the French football league system.

Tours has served as the finish location for Paris–Tours, a one-day road cycling classic race held almost every October since 1896.

Tours also has a volleyball club named the Tours VB.

== Catholics from Tours ==
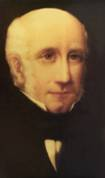
Venerable Leo Dupont, Holy Man of Tours

Tours is a special place for Catholics who follow the devotion to the Holy Face of Jesus and the adoration of the Blessed Sacrament. In 1843, Sister Marie of St Peter of Tours reported a vision which started the devotion to the Holy Face of Jesus, in reparation for the many insults Christ suffered in His Passion. The Golden Arrow prayer was first made public by her.

The Venerable Leo Dupont also known as The Holy Man of Tours lived in Tours at about the same time. In 1849 he started the nightly adoration of the Blessed Sacrament, which spread throughout France. Upon hearing of Sister Marie of St Peter's reported visions, he started to burn a vigil lamp continuously before a picture of the Holy Face of Jesus. The devotion was eventually approved by Pope Pius XII in 1958 and he formally declared the Feast of the Holy Face of Jesus as Shrove Tuesday (the Tuesday before Ash Wednesday) for all Roman Catholics. The Oratory of the Holy Face on Rue St. Étienne in Tours receives many pilgrims every year.

Tours was the site of the episcopal activity of St. Martin of Tours and has further Christian connotations in that the pivotal Battle of Tours in 732 is often considered the first decisive victory over the invading Islamic forces, turning the tide against them. The battle also helped lay the foundations of the Carolingian Empire.

== Notable people ==
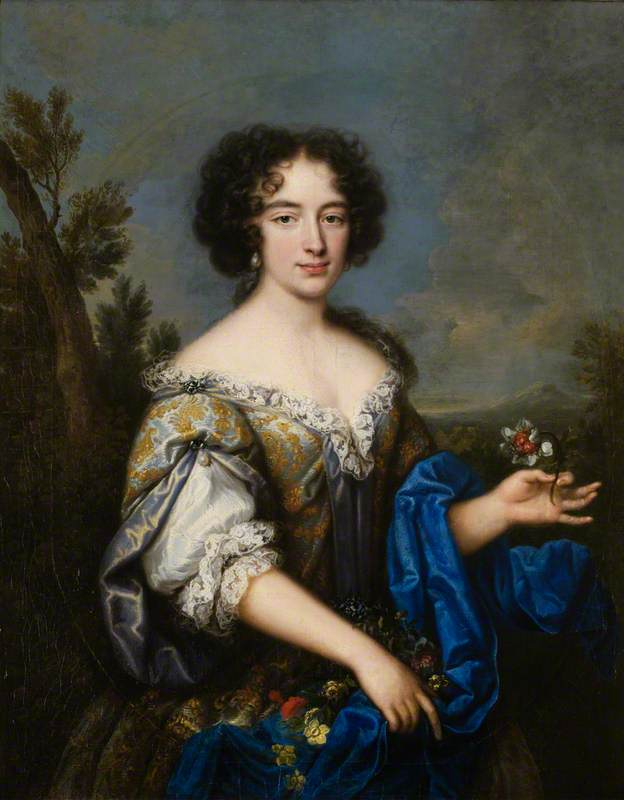
Louise de la Vallière, 17th century

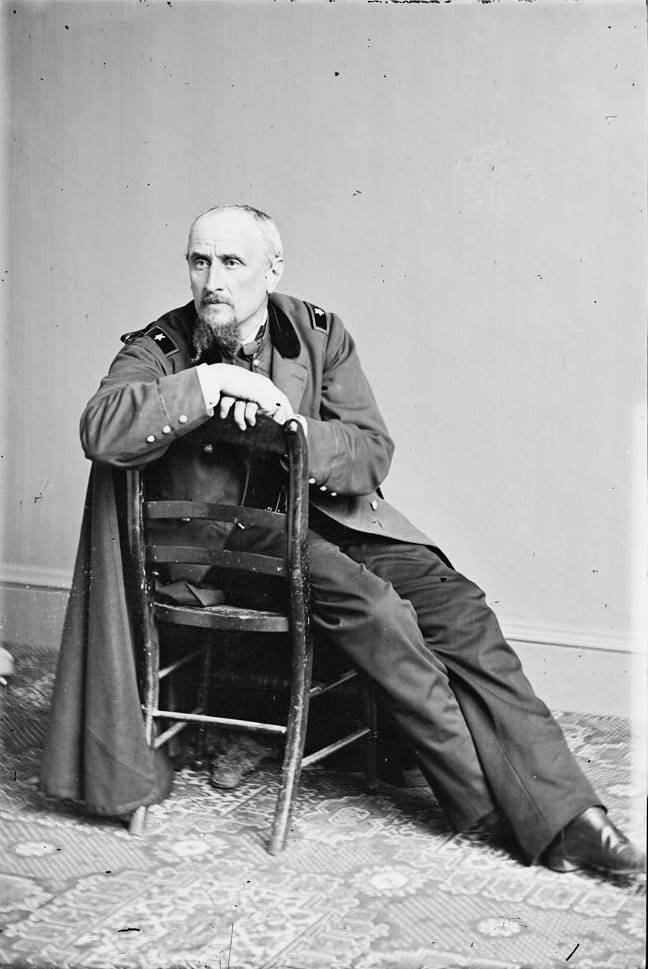
General Régis de Trobriand, 1865

=== Public service ===
- Berengarius of Tours (999–1088), theologian
- William Firmatus (1026–1103), a Norman hermit, pilgrim, saint
- Bernard of Tours (fl. 1147, d. before 1178), philosopher and poet
- Jeanne-Marie de Maille (1331–1414), saint
- Charles of Valois (1446–1472), son of Charles VII of France, younger brother of King Louis XI
- Louise de la Vallière (1644–1710), noblewoman and courtesan
- André-Michel Guerry (1802–1866), lawyer and statistician
- Marie of St Peter (1816–1848), mystic Carmelite nun
- Régis de Trobriand (1816–1897), American military officer and author
- Paul Viollet (1840–1914), historian
- Louis Rimbault (1877–1949), individualist anarchist, promoted of simple living and veganism
- Emile B. De Sauzé (1878–1964), language educator
- Baron Geoffroy Chodron de Courcel (1912–1992), nobleman, soldier and diplomat
- René Laurentin (1917–2017), theologian, student of Mariology
- Jean Royer (1920–2011), former Minister and former Mayor of Tours
- Philippe Lacoue-Labarthe (1940–2007), philosopher, literary critic and translator
- Jean-Louis Bruguière (born 1943), top French investigating judge
- Serge Babary (born 1946), politician, Mayor of Tours between 2014 and 2017
- Dominique Bussereau (born 1952), politician
- Catherine Colonna (born 1956) a French diplomat and politician

=== Arts ===
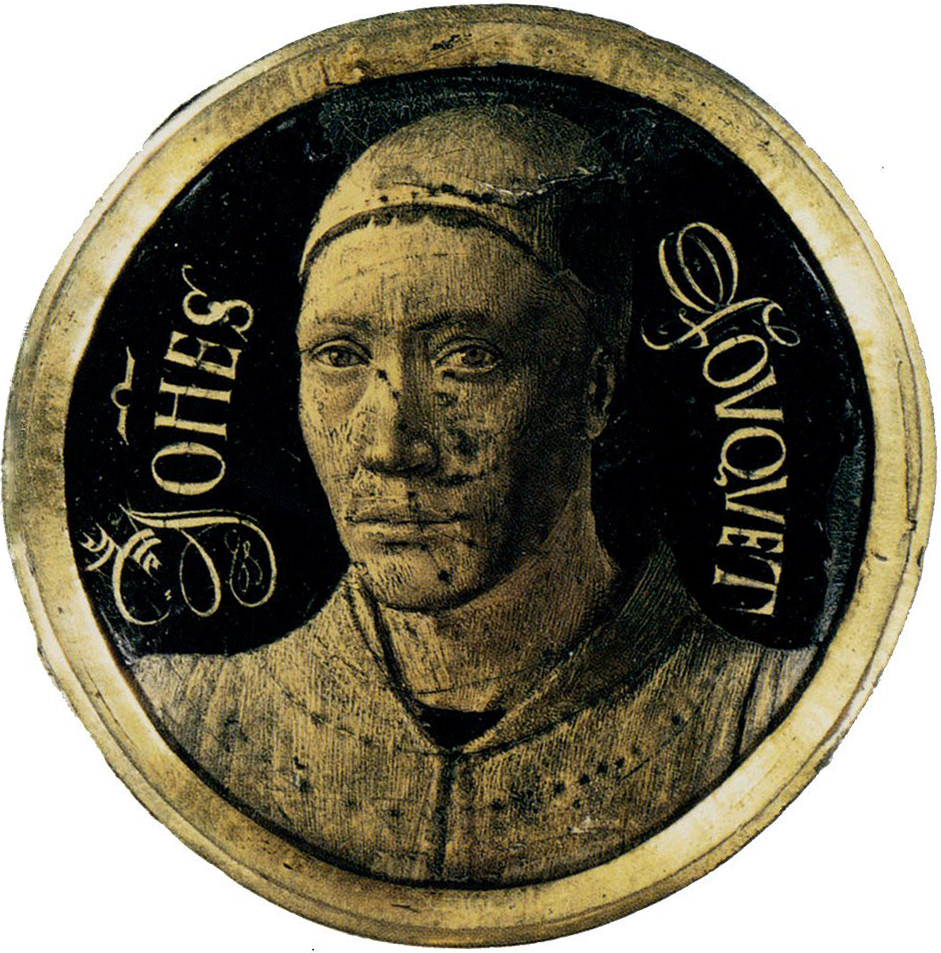
Jean Fouquet self portrait, c. 1450

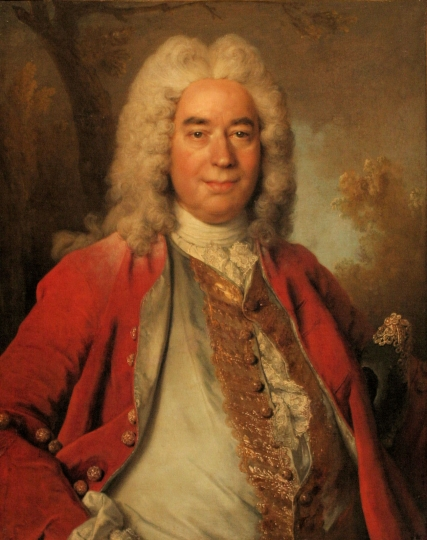
Philippe Néricault Destouches, 1741

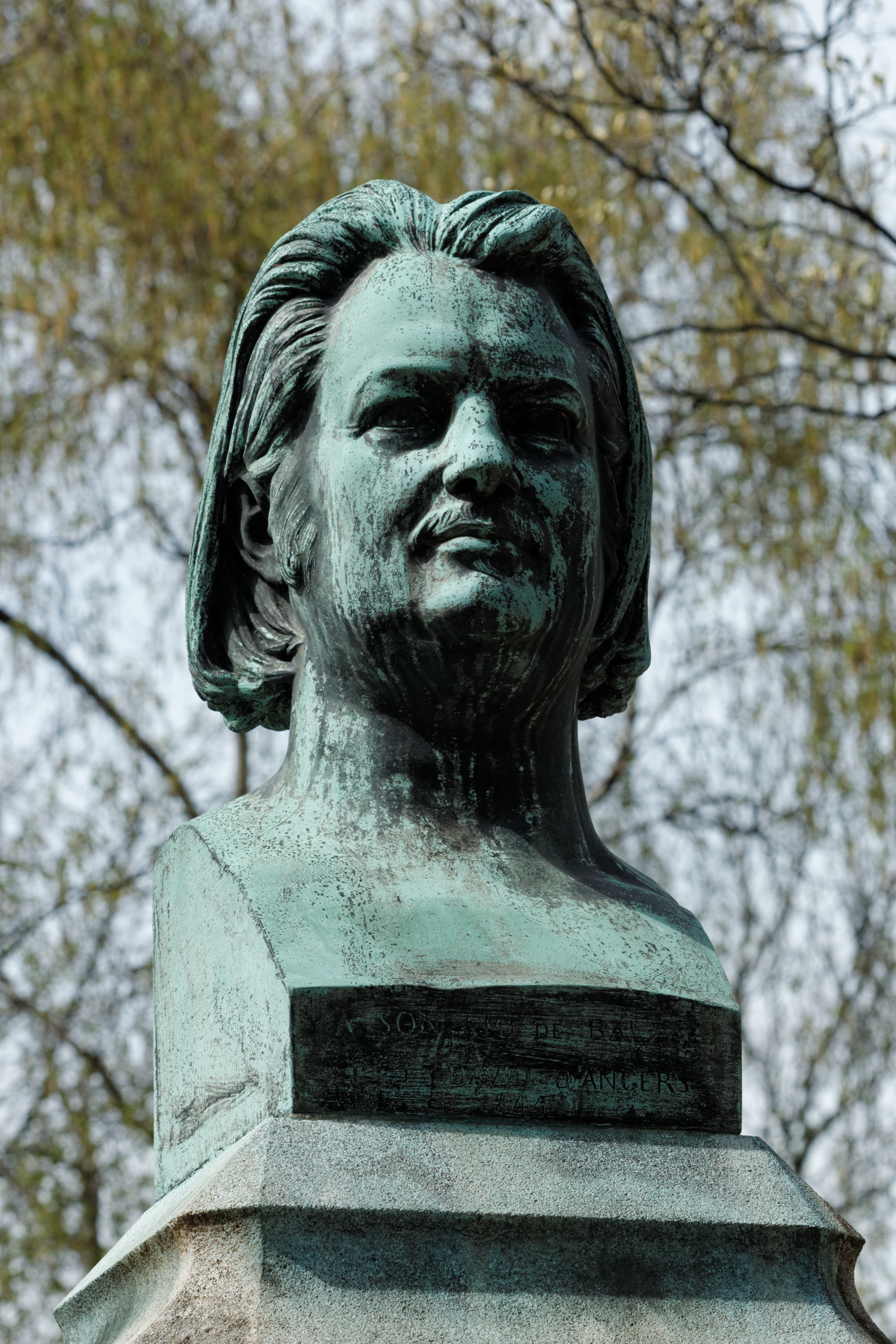
Statue of Honoré de Balzac

- Jean Fouquet (1420–1481), painter and miniaturist
- Juste de Juste (ca.1505 – ca.1559), Franco-Italian sculptor and printmaker in etching
- François Clouet (ca.1510 – 1572), French Renaissance miniaturist and painter
- Abraham Bosse (1604–1676), artist as a printmaker in etching, but also in watercolour
- François de Paule Bretonneau (1660–1741), preacher, librettist and playwright
- Philippe Néricault Destouches (1680–1754), dramatist and playwright
- Louis Dutens (1730–1812), writer, lived most of his life in Britain
- Jean Baudrais (1749–1832), writer and magistrate
- Jean-Nicolas Bouilly (1763–1842), playwright and librettist
- Philippe Musard (1792–1859), conductor and composer
- Honoré de Balzac (1799–1850), novelist and playwright
- Jules Moinaux (1815–1895), writer, playwright and librettist
- Louisa Emily Dobrée (ca.1852 – 1917), writer of novels, short stories and juvenile literature
- Georges Courteline (1858–1929), dramatist and novelist
- Daniel Mendaille (1885–1963), stage and film actor
- Paul Nizan (1905–1940), novelist and philosopher
- Yves Bonnefoy (1923–2016), poet and art historian
- Paul Guers (1927–2016), film actor
- Jean-Claude Narcy (born 1938), journalist and news anchor on TF1
- Jean Chalopin (born 1950), TV and movie producer, director and writer
- Jacques Villeret (1951–2005), actor
- Yves Ker Ambrun (born 1954), cartoonist and graphic artist; known as YKA
- Laurent Petitguillaume (born 1960), radio and television host
- Luc Delahaye (born 1962), photographer of large-scale colour works about social issues
- Stéphane Audeguy (born 1964), writer, literary critic and teacher
- Laurent Mauvignier (born 1967), writer of prose and for the theatre
- Mathieu Blanc-Francard (born 1970), musician and singer-songwriter, stage name Sinclair
- Nadia Zighem (born 1973), a R&B singer, stage name Nâdiya
- Harry Roselmack (born 1973), television presenter
- Delphine Bardin (born 1974), classical pianist
- Isabelle Geffroy (born 1980), singer who mixes jazzy styles, stage name Zaz
- Gabriel Piotrowski (born 1988), reggae singer, producer and writer, stage name Biga Ranx
- Lexie Agresti (born 1995), art historian and transgender rights activist

=== Science and business ===
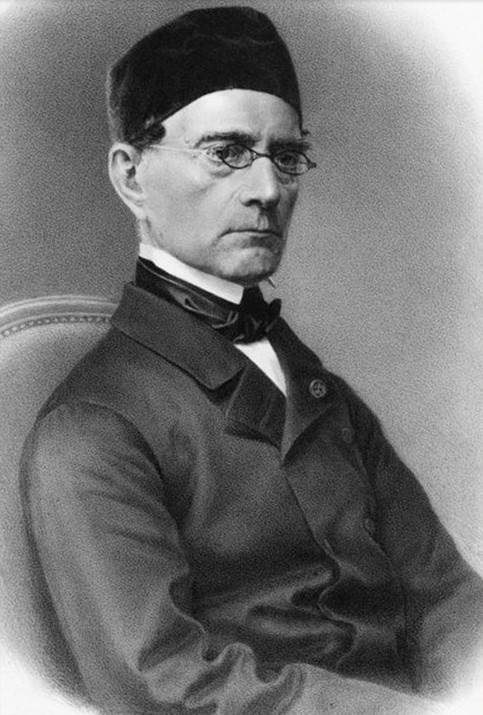
Gabriel Lamé

- Guillaume Rouillé (c. 1518 – 1589), prominent humanist bookseller-printer
- Julien Le Roy (1686–1759), clockmaker and watchmaker
- Nicolas Heurteloup (1750–1812), a military physician and surgeon
- Alexandre Goüin (1792–1872), banker and politician; linked with Hôtel Goüin
- Gabriel Lamé (1795–1870), mathematician, worked on partial differential equations
- Félix Dujardin (1801–1860), biologist, researched protozoans
- Armand Trousseau (1801–1867), internist; found Trousseau sign of malignancy
- Théophile Archambault (1806–1863), psychiatrist, also taught mental pathology
- Ernest Goüin (1815–1885), civil engineer and industrialist
- Eugène Goüin (1818–1909), banker and politician
- Jules Haime (1824–1856), geologist, paleontologist and zoologist; researched coral
- Jules François Mabille (1831–1904), malacologist, biologist and zoologist
- Paul Mabille (1835–1923), naturalist mainly interested in Lepidoptera and botany
- Émile Delahaye (1843–1905), automobile pioneer, founded Delahaye an automobile manufacturer
- Maurice Couette (1858–1943), physicist, studied of fluidity & rheology

=== Sport ===
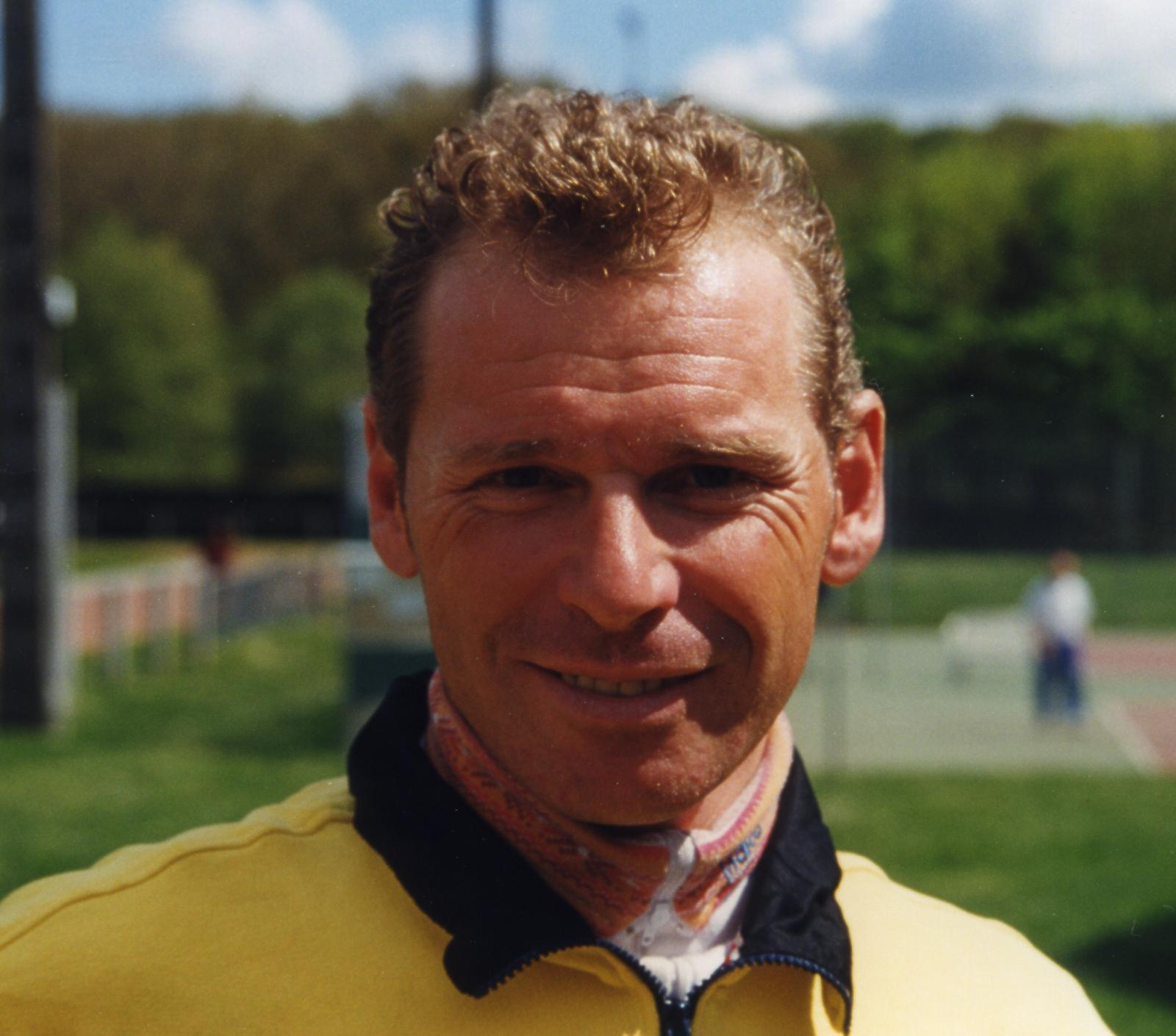
Pascal Hervé, 2000

- Mervin Glennie (1918–1986), English first-class cricketer
- Catherine Poirot (born 1963), former breaststroke swimmer, bronze medallist in the 1984 Summer Olympics
- Pascal Hervé (born 1964), a road racing cyclist
- Xavier Gravelaine (born 1968), former footballer with 405 club caps and 4 for France
- Maamar Mamouni (born 1976), a former footballer with over 290 club caps and 29 for Algeria
- Laurent Mekies (born 1977), assistant team principal and race director for Scuderia Ferrari
- Ludovic Roy (born 1977), footballer with 234 club caps (all in Scotland)
- Frédéric Dambier (born 1977), figure skater, landed a quadruple salchow in competition
- Luc Ducalcon (born 1984), rugby union player with over 250 club caps and 17 for France
- Josselin Ouanna (born 1986), a retired French tennis player
- Abdou Diallo (born 1996), footballer with over 150 club caps and 22 for Senegal
- Mathieu Inthasane (born 1986), football goalkeeper

== Twin towns – sister cities ==
Tours is twinned with:

- Mülheim, Germany, since 1962
- Segovia, Spain, since 1972
- Parma, Italy, since 1976
- Luoyang, China, since 1982
- Trois-Rivières, Canada, since 1987
- Takamatsu, Japan, since 1988
- Brașov, Romania, since 1990
- (United States) Minneapolis, Minnesota USA, since 1991

== Gallery ==
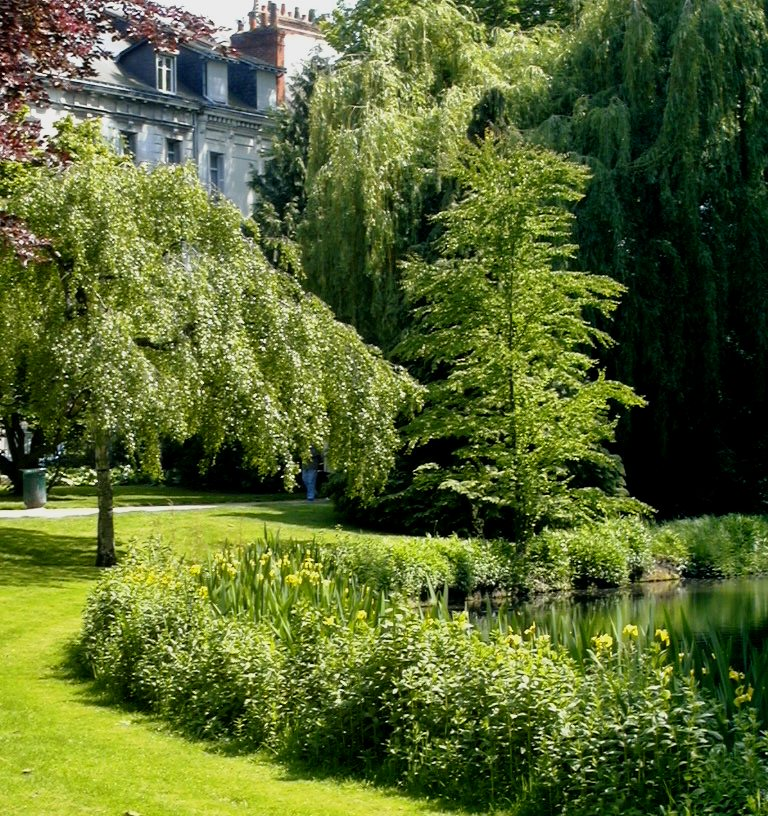
Jardin de la Préfecture (central park)

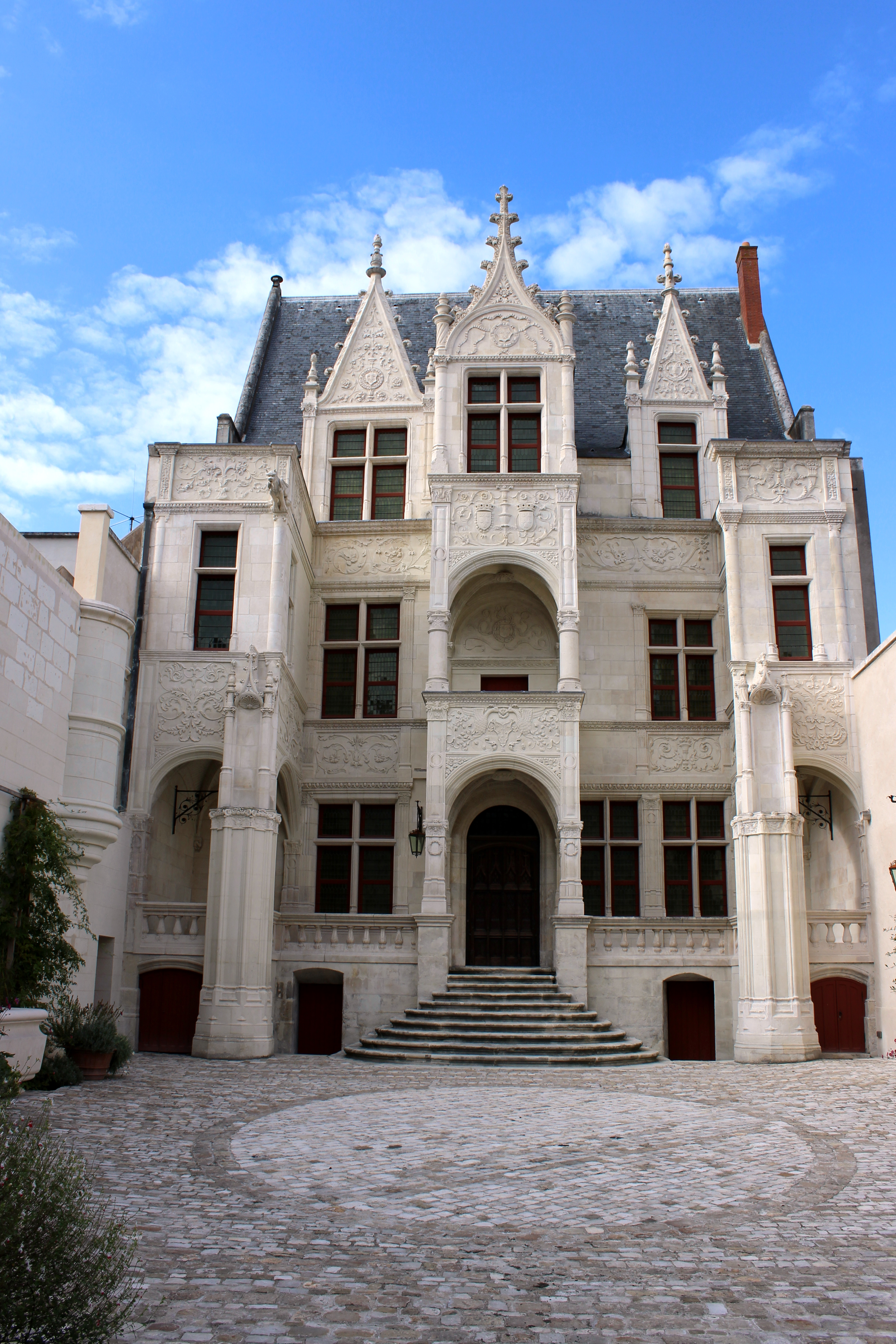
Hôtel Goüin

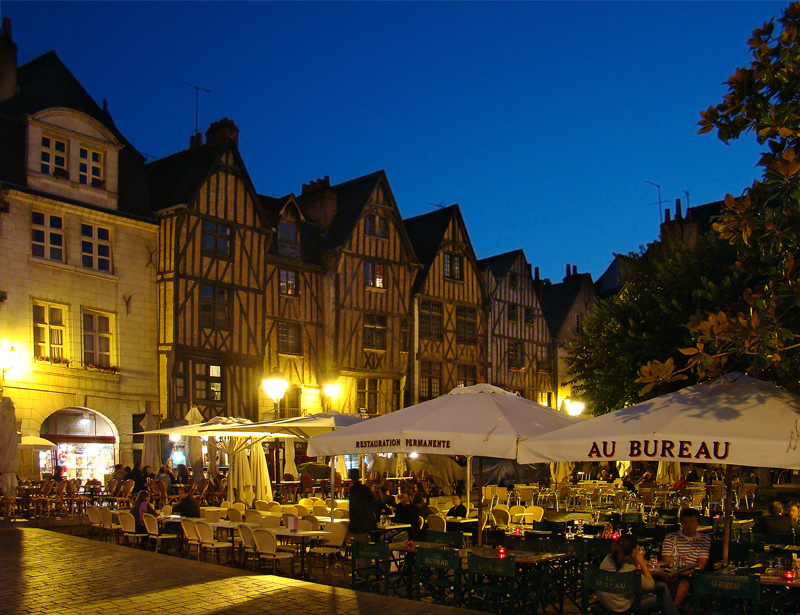
Place Plumereau

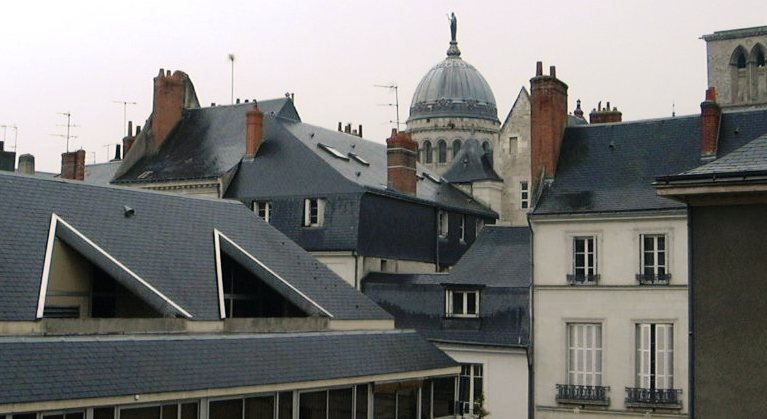
Slate roofs of Tours

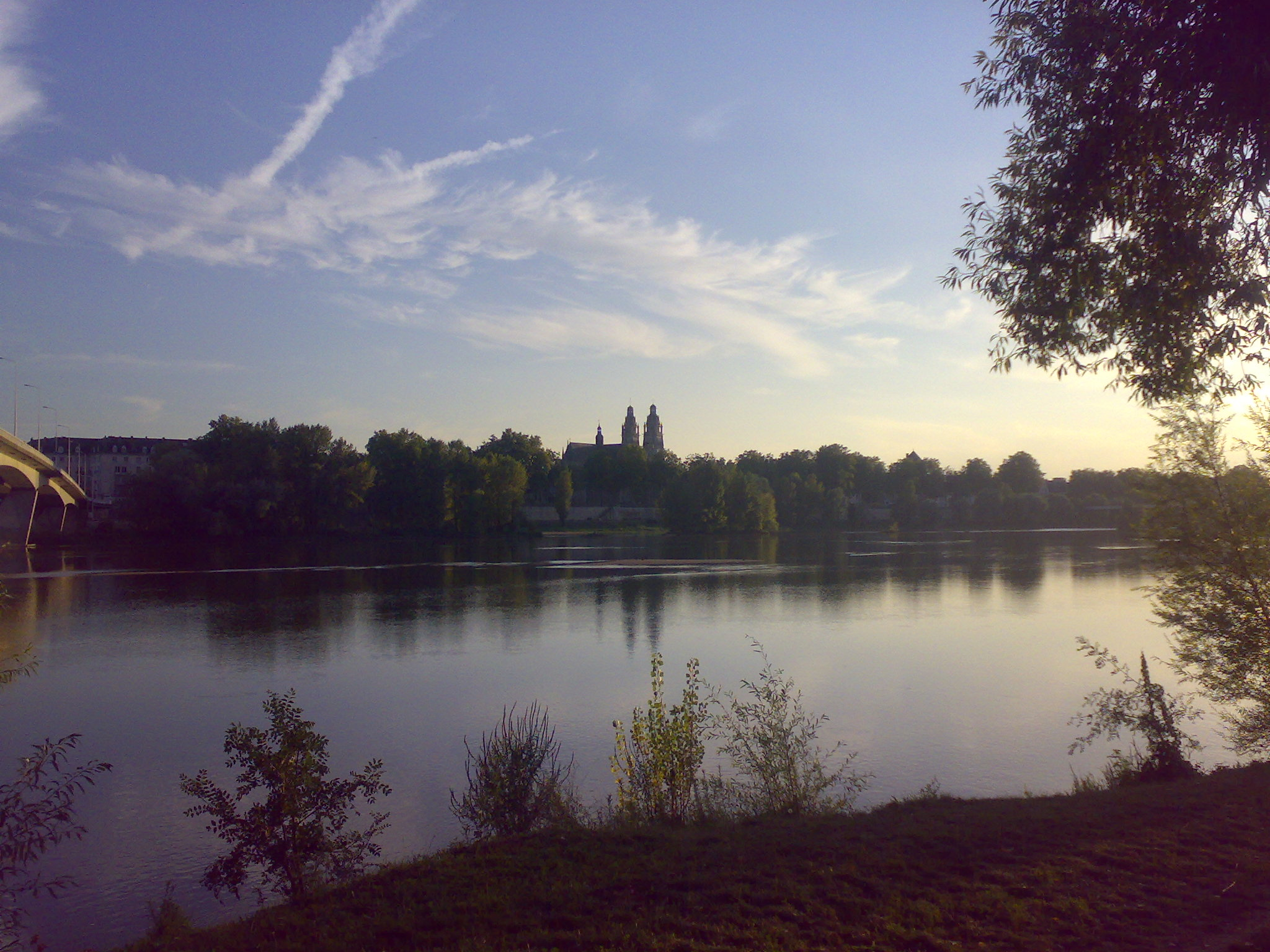
Looking towards central Tours from the north bank of the Loire, adjacent to the Pont Mirabeau

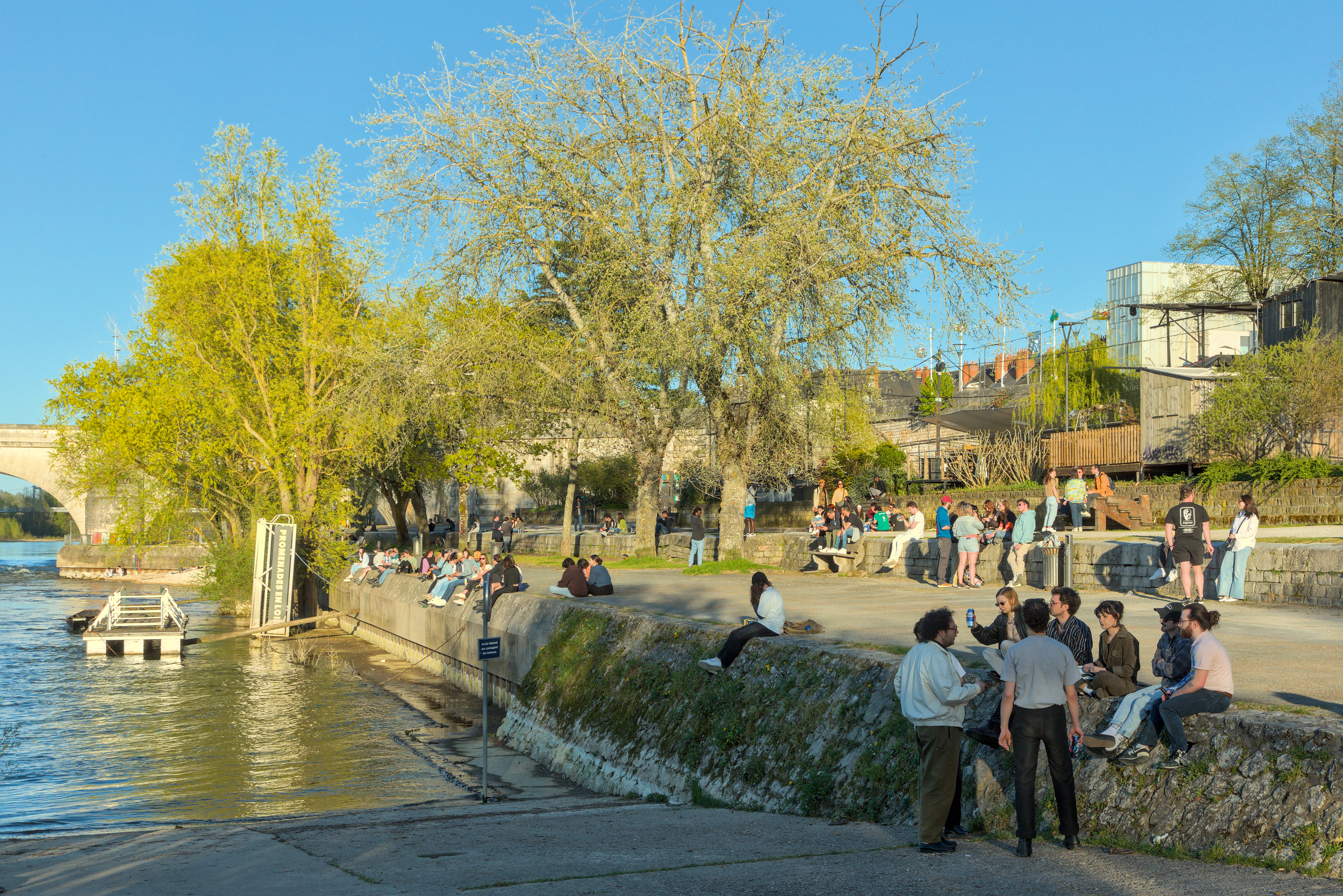
South bank of the Loire river

== See also ==
- Bishop of Tours
- The Turonian epoch, named for the city of Tours
- Listing of the work of Jean Antoine Injalbert, sculptor of Tours railway station
- Marcel Gaumont, sculptor of war memorial
- Arcis enclosure
- List of possessions of the abbey of Marmoutier de Tours
- Gallo-Roman enclosure of Tours
- Medieval enclosure at Tours
- 2023 Tours bombing
- Ancient bridges over the Loire in the Touraine area
- Beaujardin
- Saint-Clément Church, Tours
- Quartier Montjoyeux
- Gallo-Roman Baths of Tours
- Gallo-Roman Temple of Tours
- Saint-Julien Abbey, Tours
- Tours municipal library
- Châteauneuf Enclosure
- Bastioned Wall of Tours
