= Rue Nationale =

Street in Tours, France

- Rue Traversaine
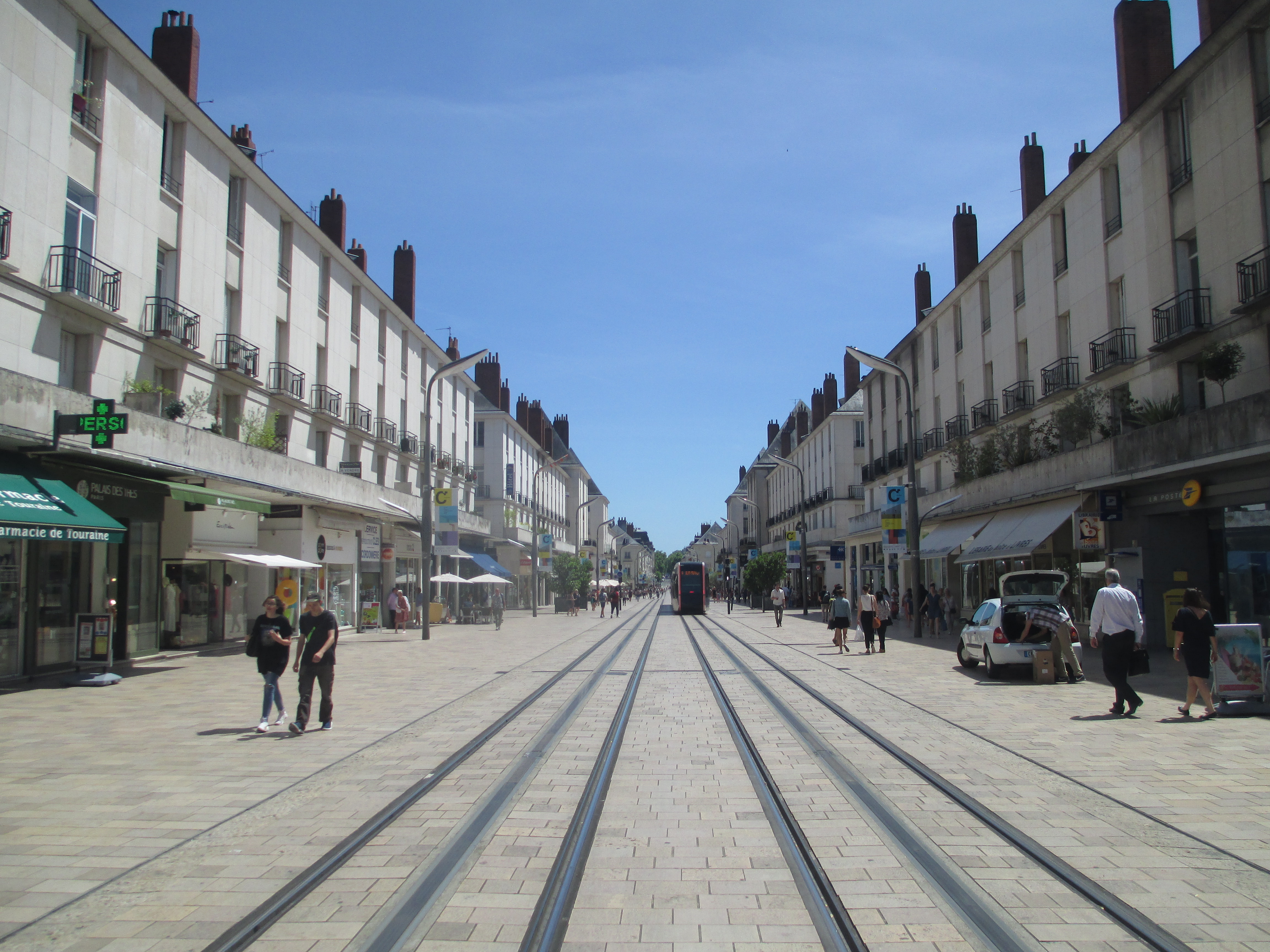
- Interactive map of Rue Nationale
- Former name: Rue Royale
- Type: Street
- Length: 700 meters
- Location: Tours
- Postal code: 37000
- Coordinates: 47.393042°N 0.687876°E

Construction
- Construction start: 15th century

The Rue Nationale is one of the oldest streets and the busiest shopping street in the city of Tours.

== Description ==
The Rue Nationale is located in the center of Tours. It is 700 meters long and extends over a flat land from north to south. It connects the place Anatole France, where it leads to the Pont Wilson, and the Avenue de Grammont.

The street belongs to a seven-kilometer straight road which includes, from north to south, the Avenue de la Tranchée, the Pont Wilson, the Rue Nationale et the Avenue de Grammont.

The northern part of the street is wider than the south which is pedestrian and only used by public transport.

== History ==
The Rue Royale, currently named Rue Nationale, was drawn in 1777 after the plans by Jean Cabet de Limeray, although there was another street before, the rue Taversaine. This project was switches the axis of the city: it was formerly an East-West axis with the streets du Commerce and Colbert, then became a north-south axis from the church of Saint-Julien.

In 1840, under the mandate of the mayor Walvein, the street was not yet compelled. All the amenities and the constructions made therein, however, maintain harmony, unity. The facades should be absolutely symmetrical, therefore, the notable buildings were built in mirror on both sides of the street (place Anatole France), before the Loire.

Under the mandate of the mayor of Tours Jules Charpentier (1882-1884) the Rue Royale became the Rue Nationale.

In mid-June 1940, Nazi bombing after the fall of Paris caused a major fire which destroyed part of the Rue Nationale, including the old Hôtel de Ville. After the war, Camille Lefèvre proposed a project to reorganize the street, but it was the architect Pierre Patout who was granted to rebuild. The northern part was completely destroyed, and then extended about ten meters.

Until the end of construction of the A10 in 1981, the Rue Nationale was heavily trafficked, as it is on the major axis connecting Paris to Spain (Route nationale 10).

The street starts with the central library of Tours and the Saint-Julien church, an old abbey. At No. 17, there was the famous Hôtel du Faisan, and No. 39 the house of birth of Honoré de Balzac.

== Description ==
Since the beginning of the twenty-first century, the street has been crossed in its first half part, by two car lanes and two bus lanes, and in its second half part, by pedestrians and public transport only. The street is completely lined with shops.

The total restructuring of the wide part of the street is planned for 2013, including new construction (a Musée d'art contemporain, etc.) and conversion of a part between Rue des Halles and Rue Émile Zola, in an area exclusively reserved for pedestrians, cyclists and trams. Buildings, including two hotels, will be designed by the agency Arte Charpentier and the architect Andrew Hobson.

There are two statues of René Descartes and François Rabelais in the street. The Musée des Vins and the Musée du Compagnonnage are respectively located at No. 16 and No. 8.
