= Yves Ker Ambrun =

Graphic artist

Yves Ker Ambrun (YKA) is a graphic artist who was born in Tours, France, in 1954 and died on 6 December 2017. He worked mainly in animation and advertisement.

Yves Ker Ambrun made his comics debut at the age of thirteen, creating 'Mesa Boum', one of the first French underground comics together with Yves Laumonier. He studied in France and in the US at the Pratt Institute in New York City. He worked for different companies, notably the Disney Studios as a character artist and art director.

Some of the comics he created are the sci-fi series 'HB-Scott', cartoon animal series 'Gaspard le Lézard', the teen series 'Flippo & Punkina' and the realistic series 'Schnecksnyder'.

In June 2011, the German version of his socio-ecological ironic graphic novel It Can't Be Possible has been published as "Es darf nicht wahr sein". Among a whole band of disparate characters it features the writer Schnecksnyder whose motto is May Sarton's "One must think like a hero to behave like a merely decent human being," as cited by John Le Carré in "The Russia House".

At the same time in Germany, Yves Ker Ambrun also launched the first issue of his new comic-book series "Mechaniko", a political allegory in the form of a science fiction story.
