= Medieval wall of Tours =

14th-century French fortifications

Medieval enclosure at Tours
- Clouaison de Jean le Bon
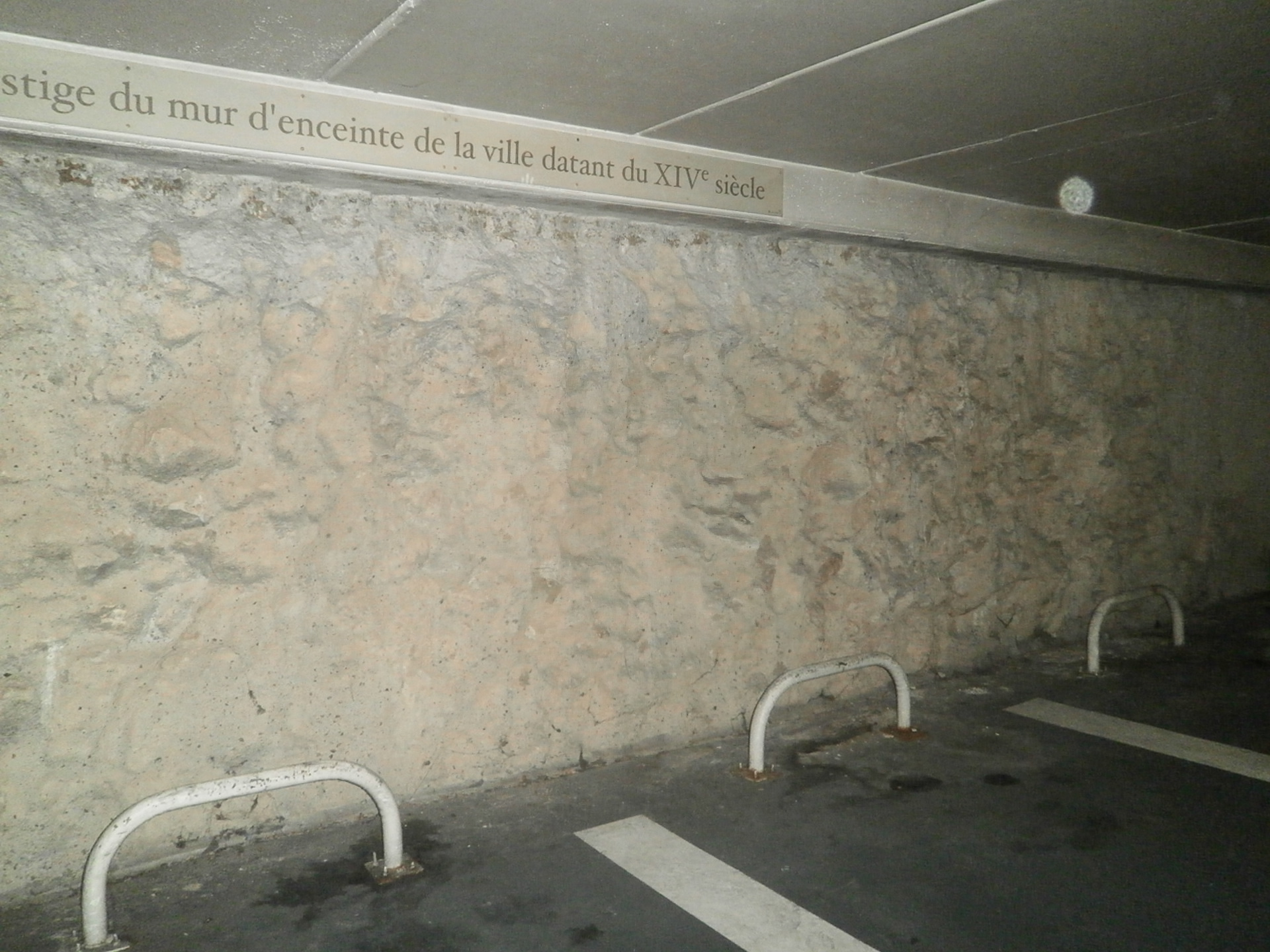
- Remains of the enclosure (Anatole-France parking lot).
- Interactive map of Medieval enclosure at Tours
- Location: Tours, Indre-et-Loire, Centre-Val de Loire, France
- Coordinates: 47°23′47″N 0°41′08″E
- Type: Defensive urban enclosure
- Beginning date: 1354
- Completion date: 1368

The medieval wall of Tours, also known as the "clouaison of John the Good" or "John the Good's wall", is a fortified defensive city wall erected between 1354 and 1368 with the support of King John II to safeguard the medieval city of Tours.

Stretching along the Loire River, the city was unified by a series of urban developments that connected the eastern "Cité", centered around the cathedral, with the western core area, formed around the Basilica of Saint-Martin. The wall's construction was of poor quality, making it obsolete relatively quickly. Despite several phases of modernization and redevelopment during the 15th century, the wall could not withstand the advances in warfare technology, especially the rise of more effective artillery. Consequently, the wall was soon surpassed by urban expansion into the suburbs. The enclosure gradually disappeared between the end of the 16th century, when a larger wall was constructed, and the early 1970s, when the areas damaged in 1940 were rebuilt and remodeled. However, the wall played a crucial role in establishing the city's geographical and administrative unity. A significant milestone in this evolution was the election of Jean Briçonnet as the first mayor of Tours in 1492.

In 1991, the enclosure was included in the general inventory of cultural heritage. Today, aside from a section of the wall along the Loire preserved in an underground public parking lot, no visible remnants remain above ground. Its layout can still be traced on contemporary city maps through streets that outline the ditches that bordered it, particularly in the west and south.

== Geographical and historical context ==
OpenStreetMap [archive] The city walls of Tours in the 12th century.

In the 14th century Tours was a bipolar city, comparable to a modern conurbation in terms of its urban structure and population density. (Note: Chevalier 1985, p. 41, Genèse du paysage urbain) To the west was Châteauneuf, which was becoming a significant commercial center and an active site for pilgrimages. Its central area, centered around the tomb of Saint Martin, was protected by the old 10th-century enclosure. To the east, the Cité, the seat of administrative and religious authorities, was entirely within the enclosures of the late Roman Empire, except for the small suburb of Arcis, which had grown on the western flank of the Cité and was likely walled in the 11th or 12th century. In between these two urban centers, the Saint-Julien Monastery, refounded in the 10th century by Teotolon following its sacking by the Normans, witnessed the growth of several smaller religious establishments along the road connecting the two urban centers by the river. (Note: Galinié 2007, pp. 383–384, Théotolon doyen de Saint-Martin puis évêque)

The residents of the agglomeration first became aware of the risk posed by the Loire River, which bordered the entire area, due to the lack of levees at that time. The insecurity caused by attacks from bands of raiders acting on behalf of the Black Prince ultimately led to the construction of a defensive structure. (Note: Chevalier 1985, pp. 107–108, La naissance de la bonne ville : XIIIe au XVe siècle)

== A new enclosure ==
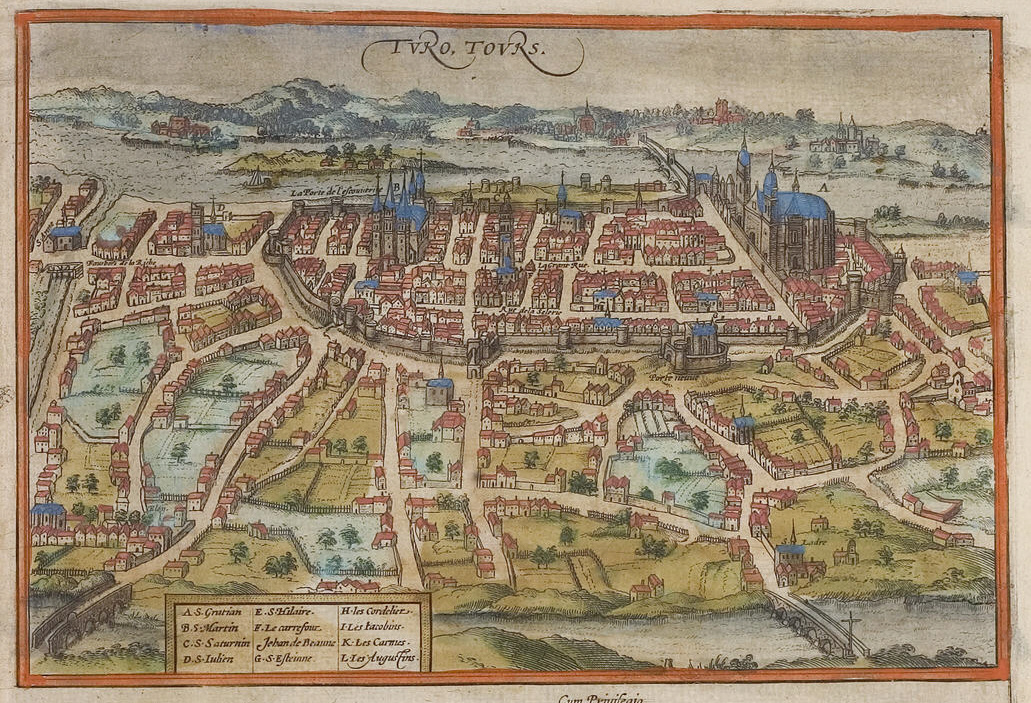
Oblique projection of Tours and the Clouaison (Georg Braun and Frans Hogenberg, 1572).

The inhabitants of Tours resolved to construct a fortification, the fourth in the city's history if the previous enclosure surrounding the amphitheater is included, to encompass all urbanized areas and unite the city physically. Moreover, the wall, known as the "clouaison", was designed to safeguard the Loire Riverfront from flooding. The construction of the wall was initiated by the residents of Châteauneuf, probably as early as 1354, (Note: Chevalier 2005, p. 24, La ville) and was subsequently confirmed and encouraged by royal letters patent from King Jean II the Good, dated 30 March 1356, in Beauvais. (Note: Galinié 2007, p. 301, L'enceinte urbaine du 14e siècle dans les comptes de la Ville) In addition to these directives, the letters also stipulated the recovery of stones from existing structures and the use of wood from royal domains. The western side and a portion of the Loire Riverfront were constructed as early as 1358–1359. (Note: Toulier 1974, pp. 352–353) The wall was not completed until 1368, following a period of inactivity between 1360 and 1363 due to a lack of financial resources. This was caused by the prohibition issued by Jean the Good, which prevented the city from imposing taxes that would compete with those levied by the royal government. (Note: Galinié 2007, p. 400, L'enceinte urbaine du 14e siècle : construction et entretien) (Note: Chevalier 2005, p. 49, Les institutions municipales jusqu'en 1485)

The construction was primarily financed by the chapter of Saint-Martin and the affluent merchants of Châteauneuf, who engaged in a competitive pursuit of generosity. The metropolitan chapter, headquartered in the Cité, was notably more reluctant to assume ownership, primarily due to concerns about the potential loss of authority, particularly given the wall's continued protection under the Gallo-Roman castrum. Ultimately, the wall's ownership was shared among multiple entities, including the King of France, the chapter of Saint-Martin, the metropolitan chapter, and the city itself. (Note: Chevalier 1959, pp. 446–447)

=== A protection that excluded some suburbs ===
OpenStreetMap [archive] Medieval enclosure of Tours. (Note: Galinié 2007, p. 403, L'enceinte urbaine du 14e siècle : construction et entretien)

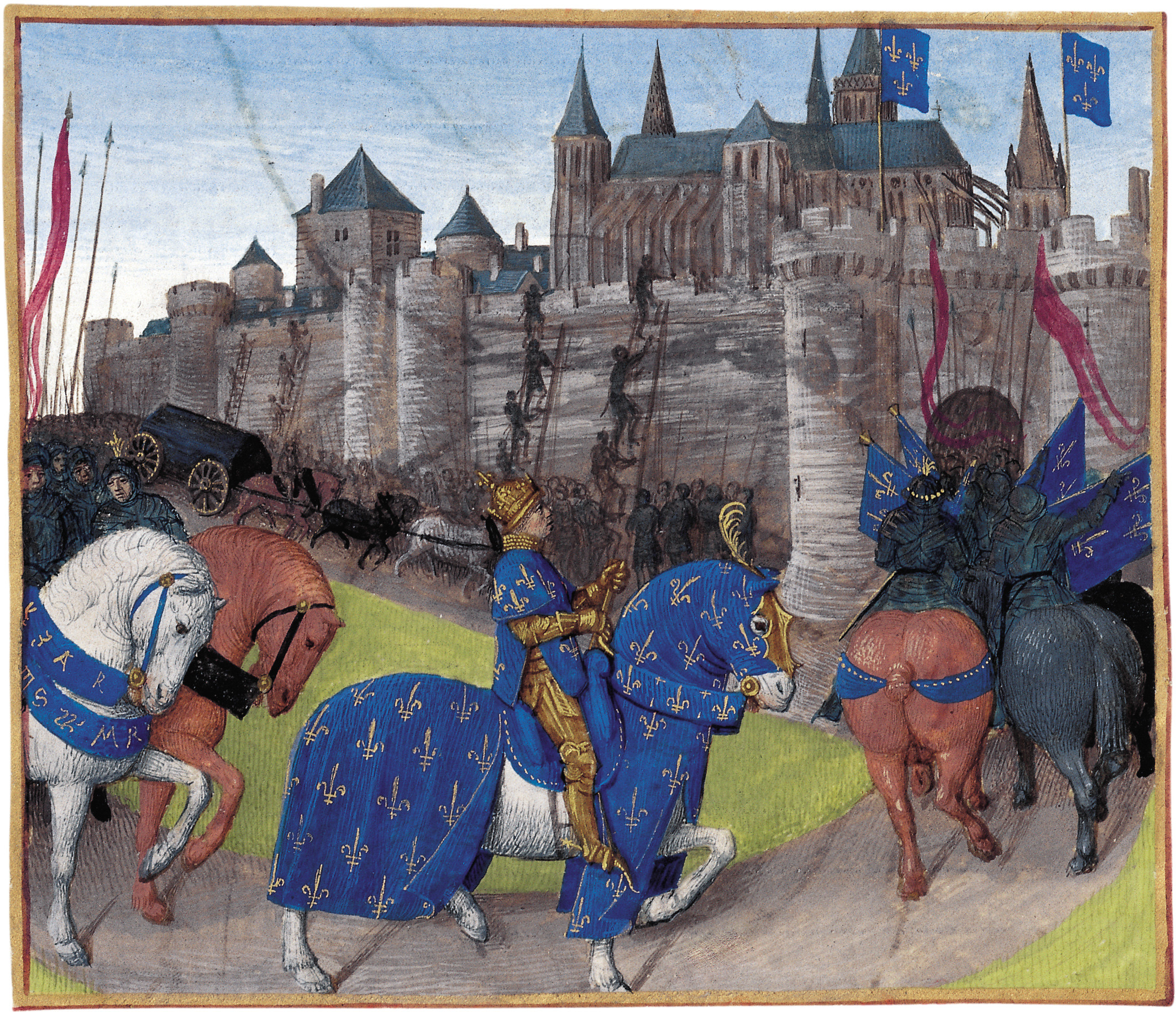
Artist's view of the nailhead (Jean Fouquet, Grandes Chroniques de France, c. 1455–1460). (Note: In this miniature, Jean Fouquet anachronistically represents a scene set in 1189 or 1203 (the entry of Philip Augustus into Tours) in the city's setting in the 15th century, with a highly idealized depiction of the enclosure. (Note: Galinié 2007, pp. 308–309, La première représentation détaillée de la ville))

The "clouaison", measuring 4,335 meters in length, (Note: Toulier 1974, p. 352) was situated to the east on the Arcis wall, representing a western extension of the ancient castrum constructed in the 11th or 12th century. The route is poorly documented in sources and on the ground. It followed the northern side of the Loire River, whose bank was gradually pushed northward through small successive embankments. It subsequently descended to the south at the level of Rue de la Victoire and Place des Halles, turned east via Rue de Clocheville, where it integrated the old Saint-Michel-de-la-Guerche Church (which was subsequently transformed into a bastion), (Note: Toulier 1974, p. 351) and reached Rue Émile-Zola, reusing stones from the old Gallo-Roman temple to connect back to the Cité. The southern wall of the structure ran in proximity to a series of marshy areas and abandoned river channels, thereby affording it a degree of natural protection. The city enclosed by this wall spanned 58 hectares and was structured by two east-west roads: The city was bisected by two principal thoroughfares: the Grande Rue in the north (Note: Chevalier 1985, pp. 44–45, Genèse du paysage urbain) (Note: The Grande Rue corresponds, in modern times, to the sequence of Blanqui, Albert-Thomas, Colbert, and Commerce streets.) and the Rue de la Scellerie in the south. (Note: Rue des Halles extends westward from modern-day Rue de la Scellerie. During the medieval period, these two streets constituted a thoroughfare designated as Rue de la Sellerie.) Additionally, there was an important north-south axis, the "Route of Saint-Jacques de Compostelle", which was traversed by pilgrims and extended from the Loire River bridge to the Porte Saint-Étienne. (Note: Livernet 1982, p. 182, Intégration des remparts dans le tissu urbain de Tours au XVIIIe siècle, vol. I) This gate, designated as "Porte Neuve" on Georg Braun's map, appeared to possess a pivotal role within the city's strategic layout, as evidenced by its subsequent reconstruction and reinforcement. (Note: Livernet 1982, p. 184, Intégration des remparts dans le tissu urbain de Tours au XVIIIe siècle, vol. I)

To reduce expenditure, the decision was taken not to incorporate the suburb of Notre-Dame-la-Riche, (Note: Chevalier 1985, p. 109, La naissance de la bonne ville : XIIIe au XVe siècle) situated to the west, within the boundaries of the defended area. Additionally, the decision to reuse the well-maintained walls of the castrum was likely influenced by the desire to avoid imposing significant burdens on the inhabitants of the Cité. Furthermore, the construction did not extend beyond the existing walls in that area. The wall resulted in the division of eight of Tours' fifteen parishes, with part of their territory situated within the city and part outside.

=== An economical construction ===
==== Curtain wall and wall walk ====
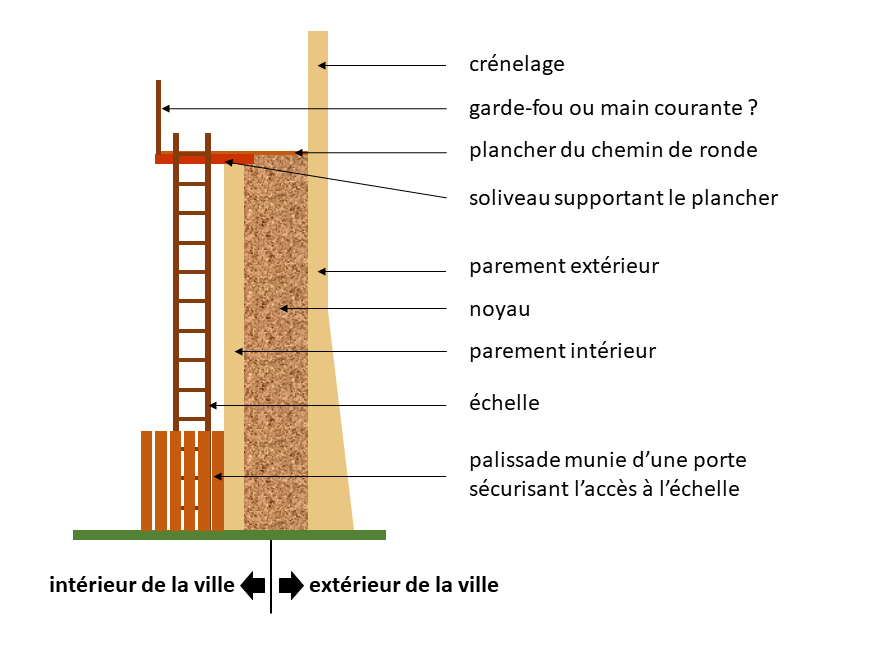
Proposed rendering of a cross-section of the clouaison (foundations and ditches not shown).

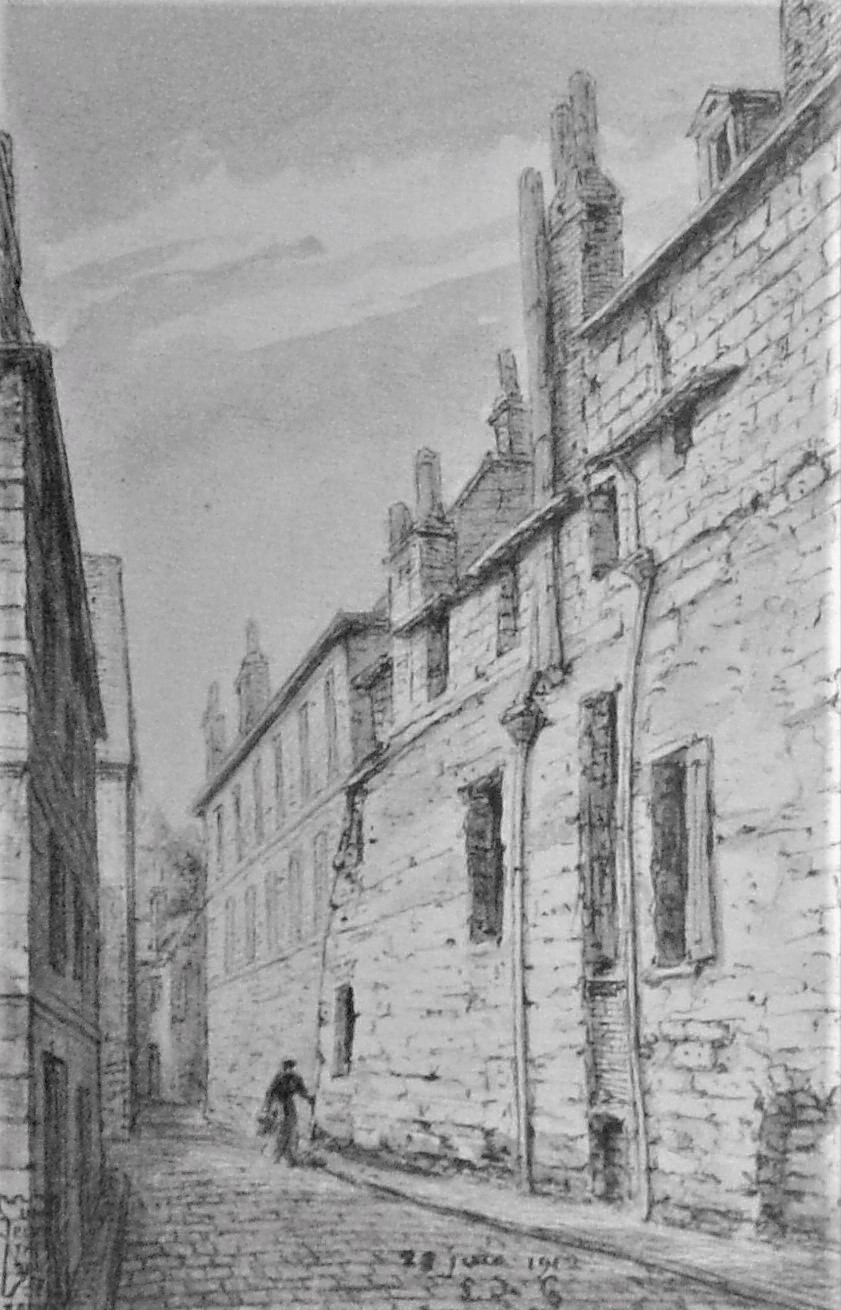
Curtain wall built into a house (rue de la Poissonnerie). (Note: The three aligned dormer windows at the summit of the medieval wall represent a modification of the original crenellations.)

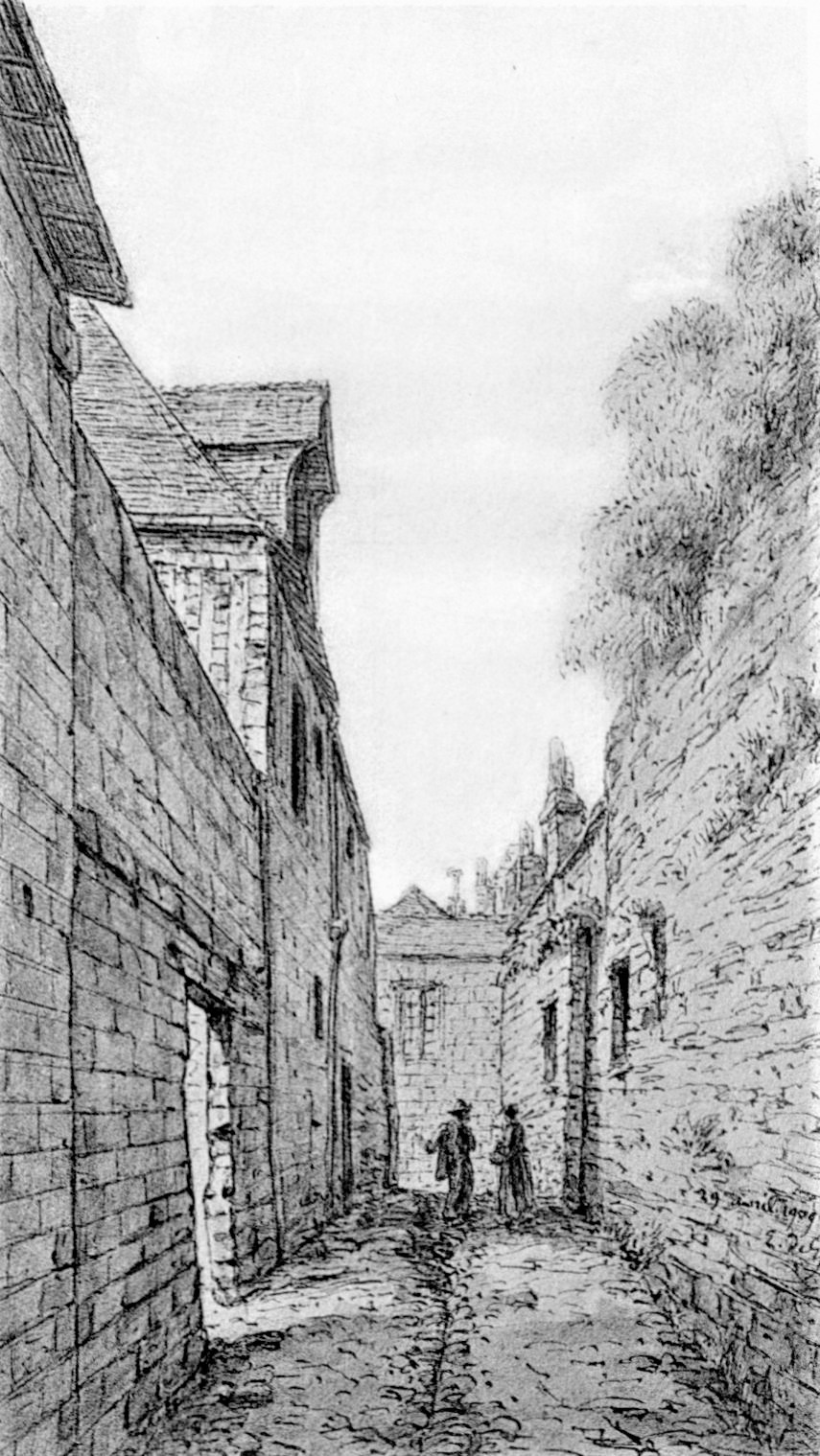
Path (passage du Bœuf) along the curtain wall.

The rue de la Poissonnerie and the passage du Bœuf, which extends it to the west (no longer in existence), were part of the "tour de ville" laid out internally at the foot of the wall.

It would be erroneous to assume that the design of this enclosure guarantees its solidity. The structure was erected in a relatively short period by multiple teams working in parallel, with adjoining sections connected in a manner that resulted in noticeable shifts in alignment. The quality of the materials used was highly variable, with some elements being of a heterogeneous nature. This included the reuse of items such as a Christian tombstone. (Note: Livernet 1982, p. 352, Remparts et ponts : « Heurs et malheurs », vol. I.) The stones used for the facing in medium-sized masonry were sourced from local quarries, with the furthest one, in Saint-Aignan-sur-Cher, situated 60 km from Tours. (Note: Galinié 2007, pp. 400–401, L'enceinte urbaine du 14e siècle : construction et entretien) The wall is situated on existing structures, including a ruined ancient temple, a church, and a chapel. (Note: Toulier 1974, p. 341) (Note: Galinié 2007, p. 401, L'enceinte urbaine du 14e siècle : construction et entretien) In the eastern part of the Loire front, the Gallo-Roman wall was heightened with masonry in medium-sized stones, which probably date from the construction of the clouaison or one of its repair phases. (Note: Livernet 1982, p. 348, Remparts et ponts : « Heurs et malheurs », vol. I.) (Note: Livernet 1982, p. 152, Planches et figures, vol. II.)

The foundations, when present, appear to be constructed from reused limestone rubble placed into a trench without using mortar. (Note: Toulier 1974, p. 362) The curtain wall is composed of two facing layers of regular limestone rubble, held together by mortar, with an irregular rubble core bonded with either mortar or clay. (Note: Toulier 1974, p. 363) The wall is approximately two meters in thickness at its base, and the lower portion of its external surface exhibits a distinct batter. The structure stands at a height of 11.7 meters (approximately six toises), though this measurement may include the foundations, as observations indicate an elevation of 6 to 8 meters above ground, varying by region. The wall is equipped with crenellations at its summit, which may have initially included wooden battlements. It also incorporates a wooden walkway constructed in an overhanging style. (Note: Toulier 1974, pp. 353 & 362) This walkway was likely accessed via ladders, which were used to safeguard (Note: Toulier 1974, p. 356) the guards from assault and to deter them from abandoning their posts, as desertions were prevalent. (Note: Chevalier 1959, p. 450)

==== Double moat ====
The entire outer perimeter of the enclosure is bordered by a wide, flat-bottomed, water-filled moat, fed by the Loire, preceded by a narrower, shallower dry moat with a V-shaped profile. This double-moat technique was common at the time and was considered the most effective defense against assaults. In the eastern section of the city, at the base of the ancient Gallo-Roman fortification incorporated into the new defensive system, the double moat system was implemented similarly to that observed elsewhere. However, excavations in this area revealed that, at least in this location, the water-filled moat was not connected to the Loire. (Note: Galinié 2007, p. 90, La fouille du site des « archives », rue des Ursulines)

On the Loire side, the wall was separated from the river by a water-filled moat, the continuity of which is uncertain. The process of digging and maintaining the moat in this enclosure section was hindered by the floods’ occurrence along the Loire. These floods would sweep away and subsequently refill the excavations, while at low water levels, the river could not fill the moat. (Note: Chevalier 1959, p. 447) Moreover, in this region, moisture penetrated the tuff walls through capillary action, resulting in their deterioration and the collapse of sections into the moat. (Note: Livernet 1982, p. 172, Les remparts, vol. I.) The excavated soil from the moats was frequently used as a bonding material for the foundations or core of the wall, although lime mortar was also employed. On the Loire front, the base of the curtain wall is perforated by masonry conduits locally designated as "tous", which facilitates water drainage. (Note: Toulier 1974, pp. 354–355)

==== Additional defensive structures ====
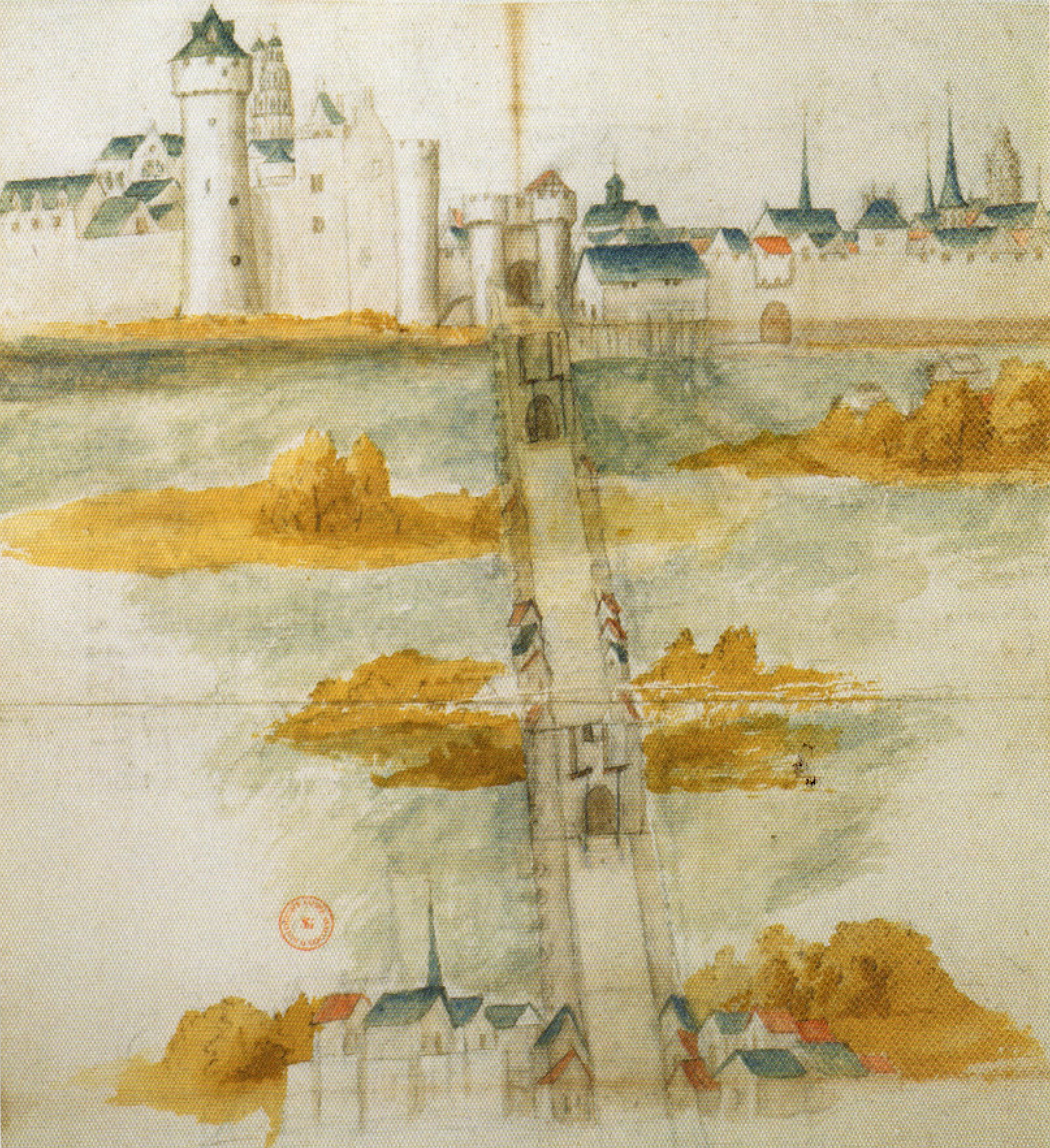
The fortified bridge over the Loire (17th-century watercolor).

An undeveloped area, in which all buildings were demolished and their stones reused, constituted a glacis approximately 50 meters in width situated in front of the wall. A 9-foot-wide passageway, situated along the interior of the wall (the "tour de ville"), was bordered by a low wall or palisade. This passageway ensured the unimpeded movement of guard patrols and provided access to the wall walk on the rampart. The 15 gates and posterns, along with the 14 towers along the clouaison, were the subject of particular attention. The towers were covered and equipped with wooden hoardings, (Note: Toulier 1974, p. 354) with some towers even fitted to accommodate cannons. (Note: Galinié 2007, pp. 304–307, La tour de la rue Chièvre, sur le terrain et dans les comptes de la ville) Three principal access points—the La Riche gate (to the west), the bridge gate (to the north), and the Feu Hugon tower gate (to the east)—were maintained as continuous points of ingress and egress, while other points of entry could be sealed in the event of an emergency. Some gates were embellished with the city's coat of arms, serving as a marker of prestige. (Note: Livernet 1982, p. 169, Les remparts, vol. I.) Portcullises and drawbridges, which facilitated the crossing of moats, were associated with these gates. Guard huts, equipped with sentries and bells to signal alarms, were constructed around the entire enclosure from its inception. (Note: Livernet 1982, p. 167, Les remparts, vol. I.)

The defensive structures were primarily concentrated on the western aspect of the enclosure. In contrast, the southern side was equipped with only two towers, as the probability of an attack from this direction was deemed to be relatively low. This was because the area in question was still considered to be marshy in the alluvial plain situated between the Loire and Cher rivers. Many wooden watchtowers were attached to the rampart, serving to reinforce the defensive system. (Note: Galinié 2007, pp. 401–402, L'enceinte urbaine du 14e siècle : construction et entretien) Meanwhile, the bridge over the Loire also underwent improvements. Bastions and two drawbridges were constructed, one near the south bank and the other at Entrepont on Île Saint-Jacques in the middle of the Loire. In case of an attack, the city could thus be completely isolated. (Note: Chevalier 2005, p. 27, La ville) The western face of the Arcis enclosure and the remaining portions of Châteauneuf's fortifications, which were no longer functional, were promptly dismantled. The materials from these structures were either repurposed or incorporated into the construction of new buildings.

== A contrasting fate ==
=== A brief existence despite renovations ===
==== Modifications and upgrades of questionable usefulness ====
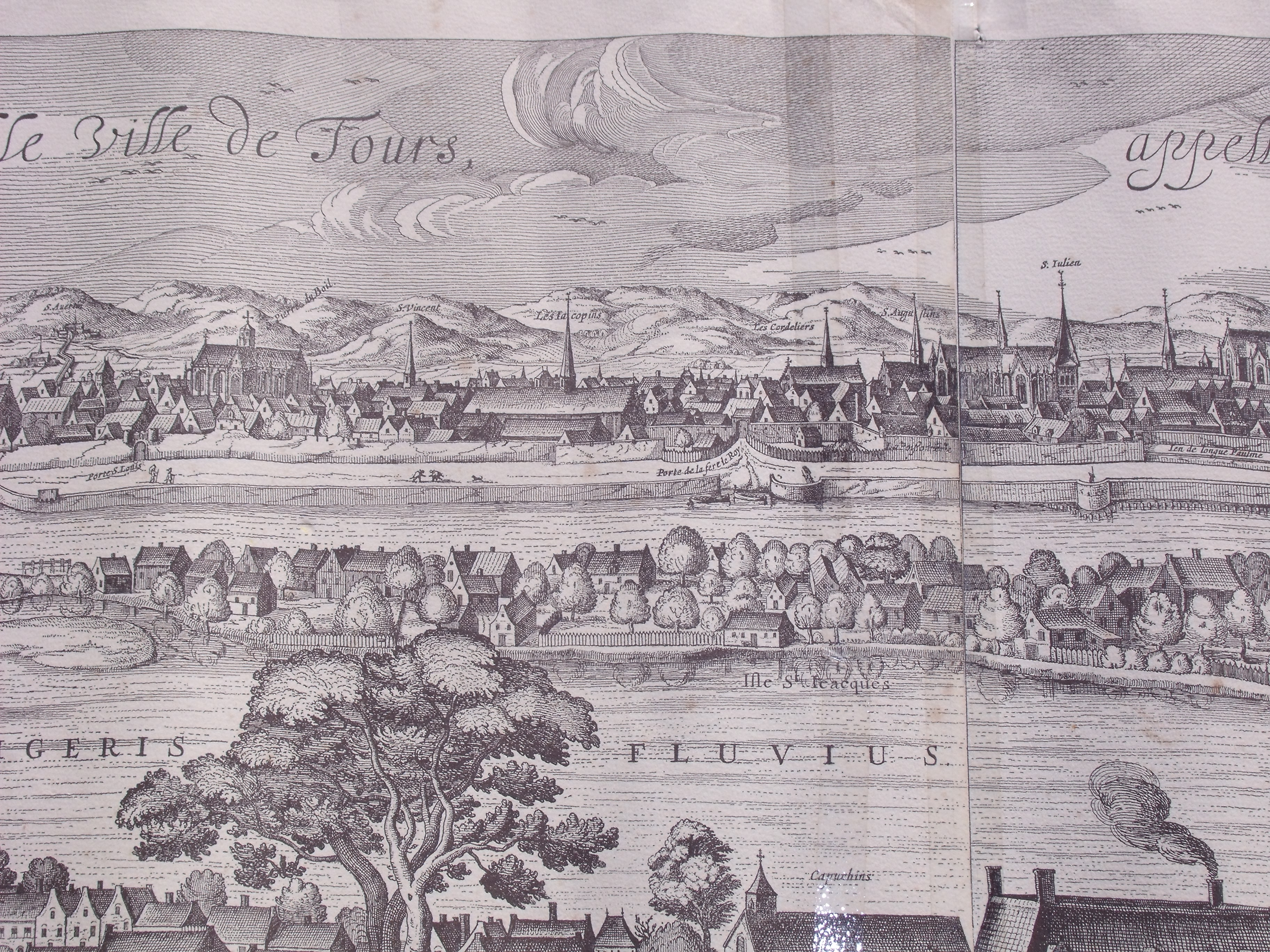
Front de Loire and clouaison (Claes Jansz Visscher, 1625).

Nevertheless, the reign of Jean le Bon was not a long-lasting one. The inadequately constructed walls necessitated frequent repairs, which imposed a significant financial burden on the city's budget. (Note: Chevalier 2005, p. 26, La ville) The 1418 siege (Note: On 2 November 1417, the Duke of Burgundy, John the Fearless captured the city without opposition. It was subsequently reclaimed by the Dauphin Charles on 28 December 1418, following a month-long siege. (Note: Chevalier 1985, pp. 111–112, La naissance de la bonne ville : XIIIe au XVe siècle)) caused damage to the clouaison that had to be repaired. As military techniques evolved, the wall no longer provided sufficient resistance to increasingly heavy artillery. Its presence became a hindrance to traffic (several gates were permanently sealed during the Hundred Years' War) and the disposal of waste and wastewater outside the city. (Note: Livernet 1982, pp. 167 & 173, Les remparts, vol. I.) Furthermore, the development of suburbs outside the walls, which also needed protection, further complicated the situation.

The dry moat of the clouaison ("rerefossé") was abandoned as early as the 15th century due to the obsolescence of its protective capabilities against artillery with increased range. In contrast, the water-filled moat was re-excavated and widened. The 1440s saw considerable work on the enclosure, including the construction of the wall walk and the substitution of stone for wooden battlements. In 1446, a tower was constructed to the south, close to the Saint-Vincent gate. Between 1447 and 1450, the enclosure underwent a slight expansion to the south, and Rue de la Sellerie (as it was then spelled) was extended in a direction that led towards the Basilica of Saint Martin. (Note: Chevalier 2005, p. 221, Une croissance équilibrée) In the latter half of the century, the construction of new towers was undertaken in response to the prevailing insecurity caused by the War of the Public Weal. These structures were erected on the east and south faces of the city, with the tower on Rue Chièvre situated at the intersection of Rue Émile-Zola around 1470. These towers were designed with the specific purpose of accommodating cannons.

The towers erected in the mid-15th century were deemed "archaic" due to their militarily obsolescent design. They were only capable of defending areas at the foot of the rampart against attempts at scaling, as their firing openings did not allow for shooting in other directions. Additionally, the thickness of their walls rendered them susceptible to heavy enemy artillery fire. This architectural choice, made by the city, was particularly unexpected given that Louis XI, who was then residing at Plessis-lèz-Tours, and his military experts had provided conflicting advice regarding the improvement of the city's defense system. Beyond the military aspect, the construction of towers on the southern flank of the enclosure, which had been almost devoid of them, may have reflected a desire to monumentalize this part of the rampart and offer a more "flattering" view of the city.

The maintenance of the water-filled moat was terminated at the beginning of the 16th century. The moat quickly silted up and partially filled due to the residents' disposal of waste materials in it. At the outset of the Wars of Religion, the enclosure underwent substantial restoration work. This included the partial leveling of the curtain wall, the construction of an earth embankment against the outer base of the wall, and the filling in of some towers to enhance their resilience to enemy artillery. Modifications to the towers, including leveling, filling, and installing artillery platforms on top, continued throughout the 16th century.

==== A new enclosure project ====
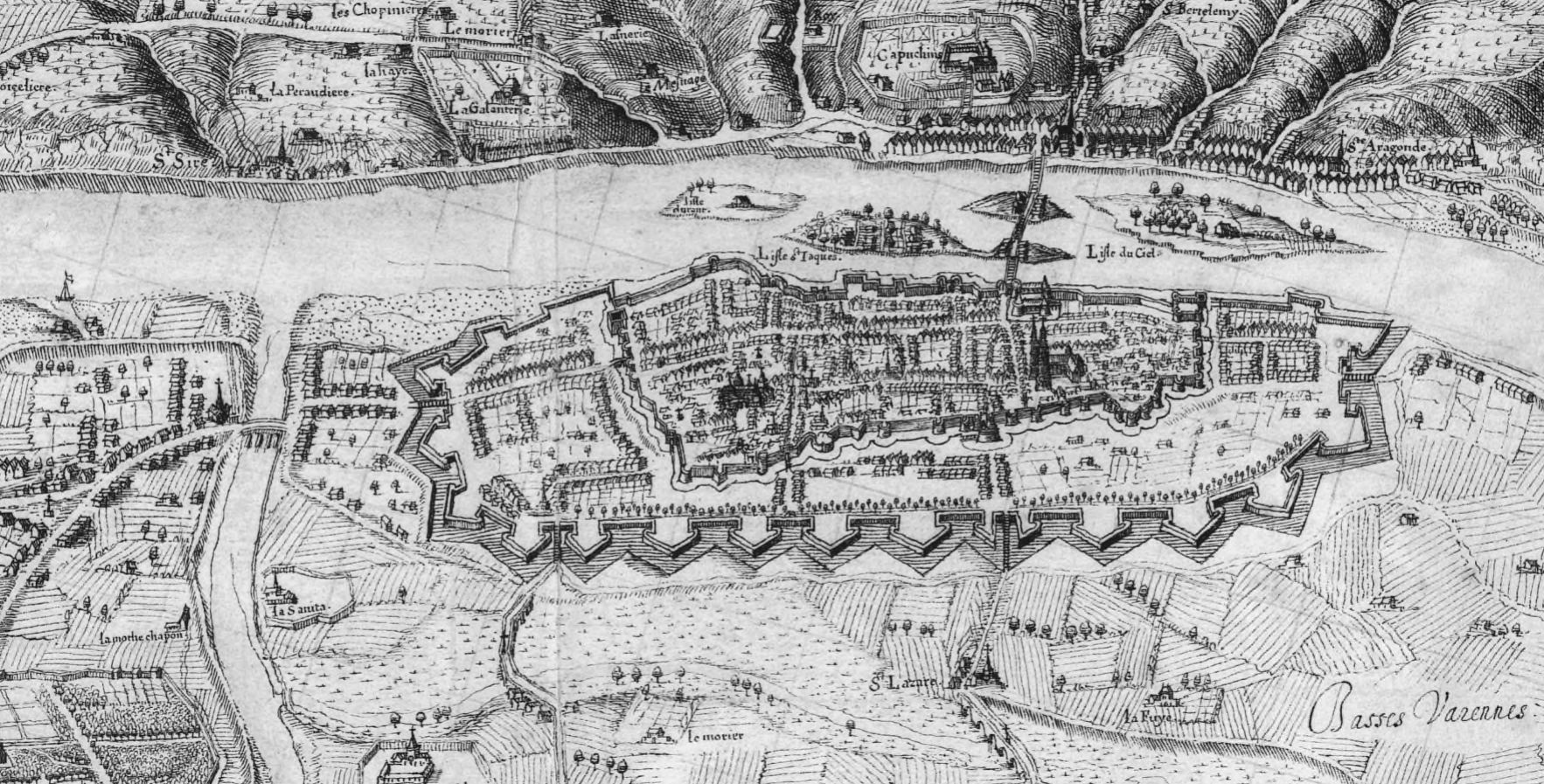
The enclosures of Tours in 1619. (Note: In this 1619 illustration by René Siette, the recently constructed bastioned rampart, whose architectural specifications were not yet finalized, encircles the partially preserved enclosure.)

A century after the clouaison was constructed and only a few years after the significant renovations it had undergone, local officials and Louis XI were acutely aware of the necessity to expand the area suitable for construction. Between 1478 and 1481, the king initiated a project aimed at redirecting the Loire River toward the northern bank. The project was too ambitious and poorly prepared, and it was halted after only a few works. (Note: Chevalier 2005, pp. 149–151, Louis XI au Plessis) After further studies, a new enclosure, encompassing a much larger area to the south, was initiated in 1591 and completed in 1685. This rendered the clouaison obsolete.

The medieval walls were dismantled in stages to facilitate the filling in of the defensive moats, some of which had already been transformed into gardens. The moats and curtain walls were sold to the city's creditors. (Note: Galinié 2007, p. 303, L'enceinte urbaine du 14e siècle dans les comptes de la Ville) The Loire front was the sole section to remain under maintenance due to the risk of flooding, including the easternmost section, which comprised the 4th-century castrum wall and had undergone significant alterations. The demolition of the curtain wall commenced as early as 1635, with the moats being filled in by 1691. The final gates, which impeded street openings, were removed in the mid-18th century.

=== A determining political role ===
==== Military and security obligations ====
The construction of the enclosure was accompanied by the implementation of a mandatory conscription system, which was designed to ensure the unarmed watch of the city and defensive interventions by armed inhabitants. (Note: Chevalier 1959, pp. 449–457) Monitoring the gates and the northern face of the enclosure was of primary importance, as this side was most vulnerable to flooding from the Loire River and potential attacks by the English and their allies, who held strongholds in the Maine region. The city's accounts mention expenses related to the enclosure, including the purchase of armaments (crossbows, firearms, ammunition, etc.). However, detailed records of these acquisitions are not provided in the texts. (Note: Chevalier 1959, p. 449) Those residing within the walls were compelled to endure the associated burdens, including the obligation to return to the city when curfew was announced by the ringing of bells from the eastern and western ends, only to depart again in the morning. In the context of the Hundred Years' War, the enclosure established a clear hierarchy among the inhabitants. Those residing within the city enjoyed a relative sense of security, while those in the suburbs faced a heightened risk of their homes being destroyed by enemy forces or even ordered to demolish them as a preventive measure. (Note: Chevalier 2005, p. 28, La ville)

==== A collective political awakening ====
Tours coat of arms. (Note: The fleur-de-lis chief on the coat of arms serves as the heraldic translation of the status of "good city," which was recreated in 1821.)

In addition to its limited defensive utility, the decision to construct this wall had notable political ramifications. Consultation became a requisite among all members of the clergy and laity in all areas, whether willingly or reluctantly. (Note: Chevalier 1985, pp. 109–110, La naissance de la bonne ville : XIIIe au XVe siècle) As a result, the inhabitants of Tours became conscious of a collective fate regarding administration, the governance of enclosed spaces, and even a distinctive form of community culture. The role of collective administration was initially limited to the oversight of the enclosure's construction. However, it rapidly expanded to encompass the city's entire administrative and managerial apparatus. This approach was initially extended in 1385 with establishing a five-member assembly, whose responsibility was to assess and repair damage to the enclosure caused by several Loire floods. (Note: Chevalier 2005, p. 41, Les institutions municipales jusqu'en 1485) In 1462, the city council (assembly of municipal officers), led by a mayor with an annual mandate, was established. Jean Briçonnet was the first mayor. This structure was dominated by the bourgeoisie and sought to represent the socio-professional diversity of the elite living within the walls. The "good city" was emerging as a distinct entity (Note: Chevalier 1985, p. 91, La naissance de la bonne ville : XIIIe au XVe siècle) separate from its suburbs.

== Chronology of the enclosure ==
Chronology of Jean the Good's enclosure, from its construction to its abandonment.

Episode in French and	Tours' history directly linked to the enclosure's evolution
Construction phase	Destruction or weakening phase

== Few remains ==
In his 1912 publication, Tours That Disappear, Édouard Gatian de Clérambault illustrated several parts of the enclosure, including portions of curtain walls integrated into newer buildings and gates. However, no above-ground remains of Jean the Good's enclosure survive in the 21st century. The Rouline Gate, situated at the extremity of the amphitheater's bastion and subsequently reinforced, became insufficiently broad for carts to traverse, ultimately leading to its disappearance during the 18th century. "Rue de la Grosse Tour" serves to commemorate one of the defensive towers, also designated as the Malquin Tower, situated on the western side of the enclosure, to the north of the present-day Place Gaston-Paillhou and west of the Place du Grand-Marché. (Note: Galinié 2007, pp. 272–273, Considérations sur l'architecture domestique des 12e-14e siècles à Châteauneuf)

The fires that engulfed Tours in June 1940 and the subsequent post-war reconstruction efforts played a pivotal role in the gradual demise of the remaining portions of the enclosure that had managed to withstand the test of time. (Note: Livernet 1982, p. 355, Remparts et ponts : « Heurs et malheurs », vol. I.) The final sections of the curtain wall in Passage du Bœuf were razed in early 1974, (Note: Toulier 1974, p. 359) during the urban redevelopment of the Tanneurs district and the construction of buildings for the University of Tours. (Note: The question of preserving these last vestiges was first raised at their discovery. The local press provided coverage of this issue, but the authorities' response was negative. (Note: Livernet 1982, p. 350, Remparts et ponts : « Heurs et malheurs », vol. I.)) In 1991, the foundations of a 14th-century tower (the "Posson" tower) were subjected to analysis on Rue de la Victoire before being reburied. (Note: Galinié 2007, pp. 134–135, Les observations au 40-44bis rue de la Victoire) The discovery of foundations in 2002 during the excavation of the Anatole-France public parking lot prompted a comprehensive study of the Loire's medieval front. These remains were initially preserved underground but were subsequently removed, cleaned, and reinstalled in their original location on a concrete base. The exterior of the wall is visible from within the parking lot, and it is the sole remaining vestige accessible to the public in the 21st century.

Despite the enclosure's disappearance from the urban landscape, its footprint continues to exert an influence on the city's road network. Rue des Fossés Saint-Georges, which was established in the late 17th century following the ditch that bordered the southern section of the enclosure, has survived into the modern era and is now known as Clocheville and Émile-Zola streets. In the latter street, the imperfect alignment of several building facades in Sainte-Ursule High School is a consequence of their foundations resting on the remains of the curtain wall and a tower built in 1446 in the vicinity of the Saint-Vincent Gate. (Note: Livernet 1982, p. 168, Planches et figures, vol. II.) On the western side, Rue de la Victoire (formerly Rue des Fossés Saint-Martin) and the western part of Place Gaston-Paillhou (formerly Rue des Fossés Saint-Clément (Note: Livernet 1982, p. 178, Intégration des remparts dans le tissu urbain de Tours au XVIIIe siècle, vol. I.)) also demonstrate the proximity of the enclosure. The Saint-Étienne Gate, dismantled in the 17th century, is now occupied by the western part of Place François-Sicard. (Note: Livernet 1982, p. 357, Remparts et ponts : « Heurs et malheurs », vol. I.)

In consequence of an investigation initiated in 1997, the enclosure of Jean the Good was incorporated into the general inventory of cultural heritage in 1991.

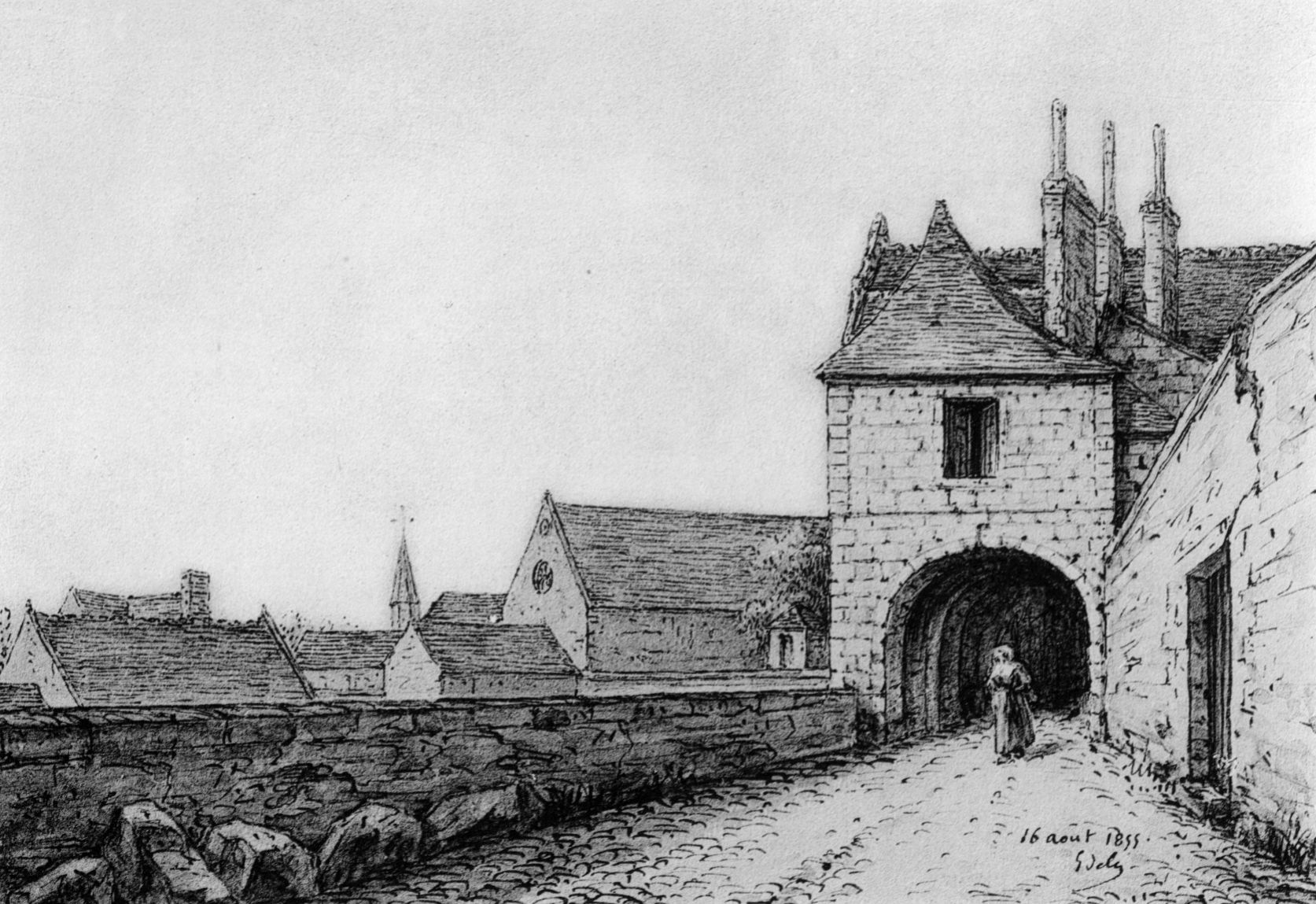
View of the Rouline gate from east of rue du Général-Meusnier. (Note: Given that this illustration is dated 1899, it can be reasonably assumed that Gatian de Clérambault depicted the gate, which was destroyed in 1877, from memory.)

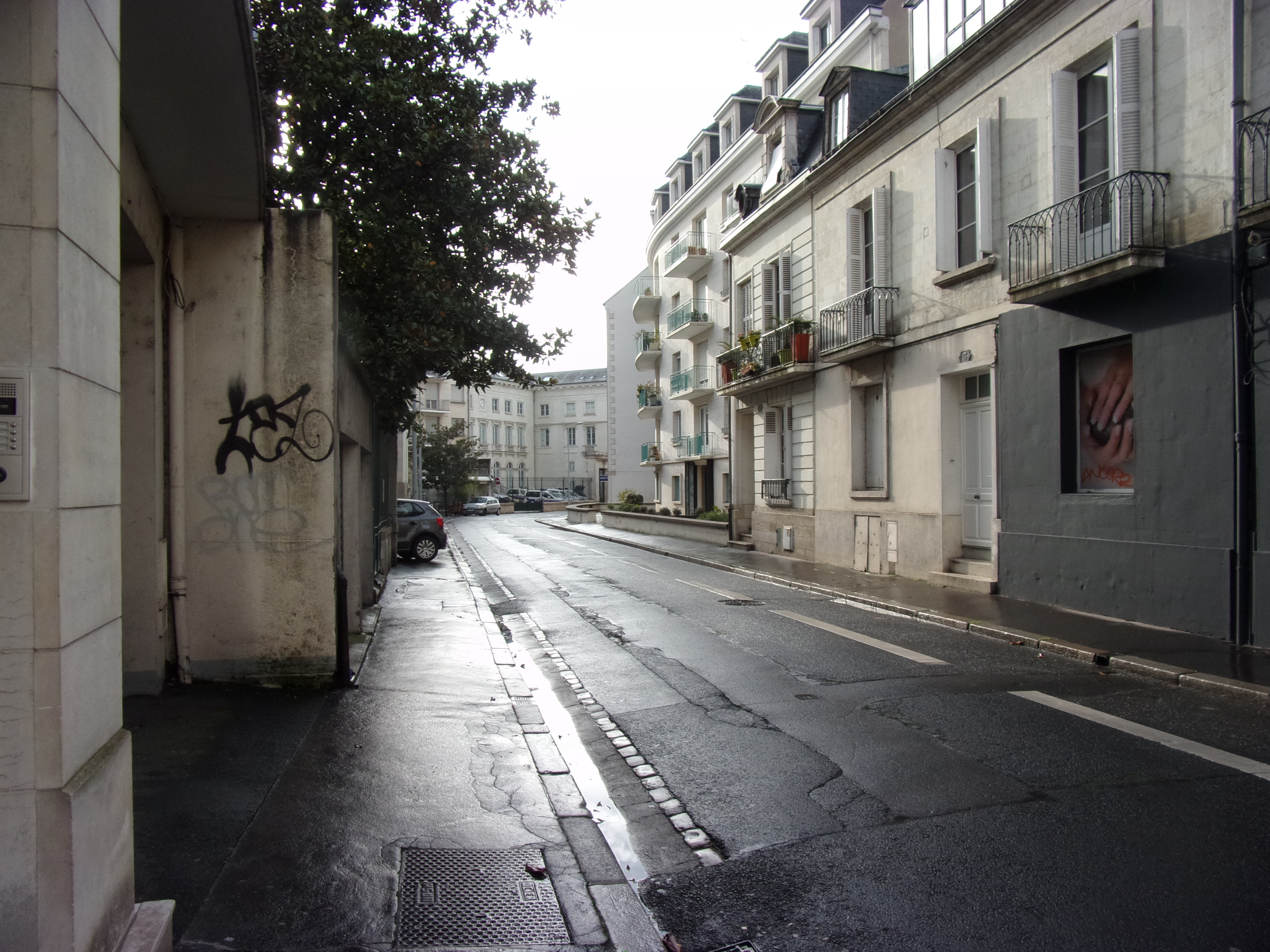
Rue de Clocheville looking west.

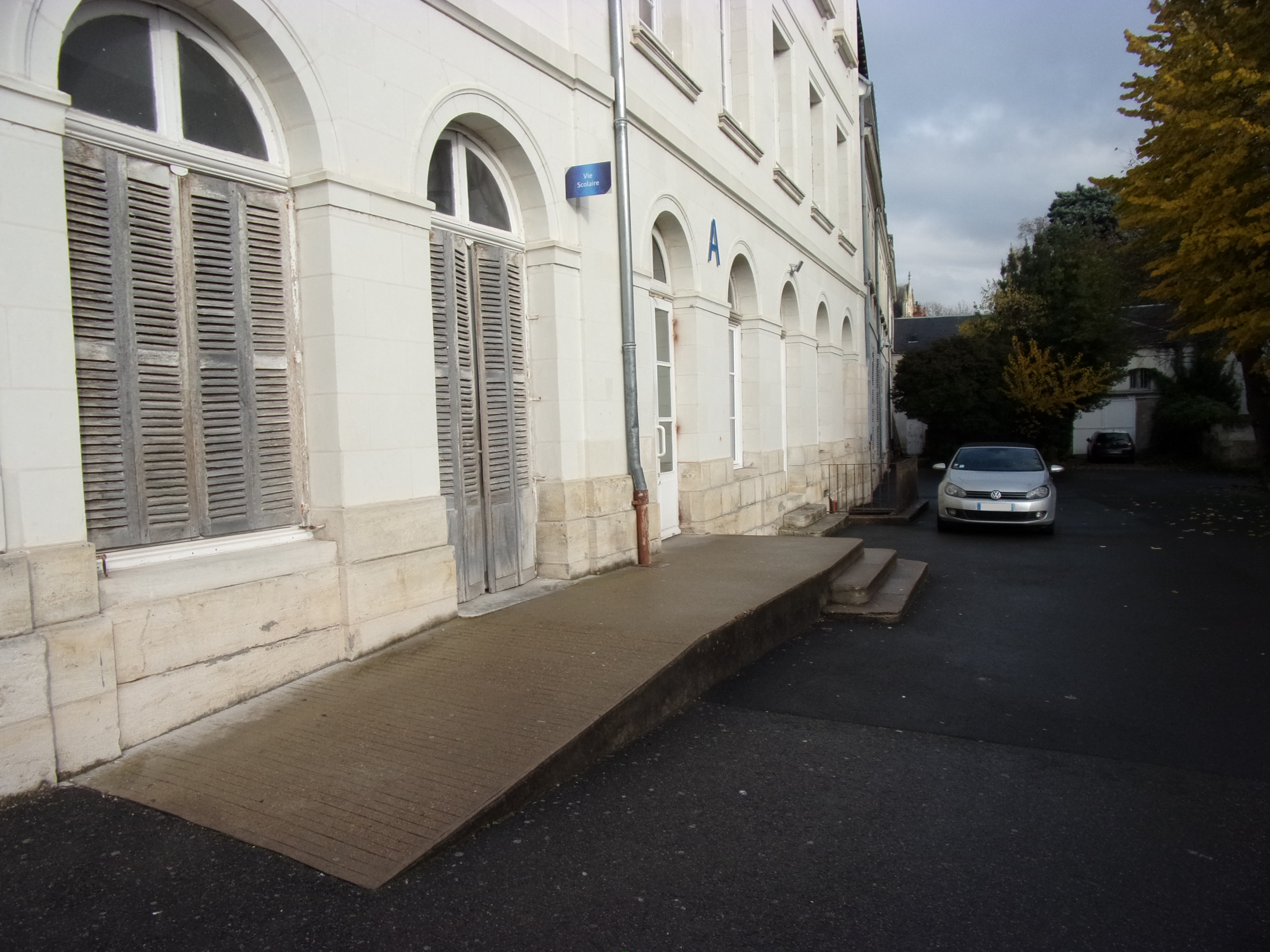
Lycée Sainte-Ursule (rue Émile-Zola).

== Historical and archaeological studies ==
Before the 21st century, no specific publication dedicated to the global study of the enclosure existed. Among the available documentation, those mentioned in this section provide unique insights into the architectural features of this enclosure and its historical context.

In 1959, Bernard Chevalier analyzed the impact of the enclosure's construction on the city's military organization and defense in an edition of the Bulletin philologique et historique du comité des travaux historiques et scientifiques.

In 1974, Bernard Toulier published the results of observations made in the northwest of the city in the Bulletin de la Société archéologique de Touraine (BSAT). At the time, parts of the enclosure were on the verge of destruction due to the redevelopment of the Tanneurs district and the construction of buildings for the University of Tours.

In his doctoral thesis, Tours du XVIII^{e} au XX^{e} siècle. La conservation des éléments anciens dans une ville moderne (1982), Sylvain Livernet dedicates several passages to the fate of the enclosure's remains and their integration into the modern city.

In a 1991 BSA article, Christian Theureau presented the findings of his observations on the western side of the enclosure. These observations provided insights into the structural details of the ditches, curtain wall, and one of the towers.

In 1999, Bernard Chevalier provided a detailed account of the chronology and political interpretation of the modifications made to the enclosure in the 15th century in a chapter of the book Les Enceintes urbaines (XIII^{e} et XVI^{e} siècles).

In the collective work Tours antique et médiéval. Lieux de vie, temps de la ville. 40 ans d'archéologie urbaine, published in 2007 under the direction of Henri Galinié, several chapters are dedicated to the enclosure. These chapters address the archaeological remains, integration into the urban plan, and political consequences of its construction.

== Bibliography ==
=== Publications specifically devoted to nailing ===
- Chevalier, Bernard (1959). "L'organisation militaire à Tours au XVe siècle". Bulletin philologique et historique (Jusqu'à 1610) du comité des travaux historiques et scientifiques (in French): 445–459.
- Chevalier, Bernard (1999). "La rénovation de l'enceinte de Tours dans la seconde moitié du XVe siècle : respect de la tradition ou modernisation ?". Les enceintes urbaines (XIIIe et XVIe siècles) – Actes du 121e congrès national des sociétés historiques et scientifiques, Nice, 1996 (in French). Paris: Éditions du CTHS. pp. 75–82. ISBN 978-2-7355-0378-0.
- Theureau, Christian (1992). "Observations sur le système défensif du XIVe siècle à Tours. Rapport préliminaire sur l'intervention effectuée rue de la Victoire en 1991". Bulletin de la Société archéologique de Touraine (in French). XLIII: 497–508. ISSN 1153-2521. Archived from the original on 29 November 1998.
- Toulier, Bernard (1974). "Contribution à l'étude du tracé de l'enceinte du XIVe siècle à Tours". Bulletin de la Société archéologique de Touraine (in French). XXXVII: 351–371. ISSN 1153-2521. Archived from the original on 7 November 2021.

=== Publications devoted to architecture, history or urban planning in Tours ===
- Chevalier, Bernard (1985). Histoire de Tours (in French). Toulouse: Privat. ISBN 2-7089-8224-9.
- Chevalier, Bernard (2005). Tours, ville royale, 1356-1520 : Origine et développement d'une capitale à la fin du Moyen ge (in French). Chambray-lès-Tours: CLD. ISBN 978-2-8544-3047-9.
- Galinié, Henri; Randoin, Bernard (1979). Les archives du sol à Tours : survie et avenir de l'archéologie de la ville (in French). Société archéologique de Touraine et Laboratoire d'archéologie urbaine de Tours.
- Galinié, Henri (2007). Tours antique et médiéval. Lieux de vie, temps de la ville. 40 ans d'archéologie urbaine, Supplément à la RACF n° 30, numéro spécial de la collection Recherches sur Tours (in French). Tours: FERACF. ISBN 978-2-9132-7215-6.
- Gatian de Clérambault, Édouard (1912). Tours qui disparaît (in French). Tours: Péricat.
- Gascuel, Geneviève (1999). À la découverte des noms des rues de Tours (in French). Montreuil-Bellay: CMD. ISBN 978-2-8447-7024-0.
- Giraudet, Eugène (1873). Histoire de la ville de Tours (in French). Vol. I & II. Tours: Les principaux libraires.
- Leveel, Pierre (1994). La Touraine disparue et ses abords immédiats (in French). Chambray-lès-Tours: CLD. ISBN 2-8544-3253-3.
- Livernet, Sylvain (1982). Tours du XVIIIe au XXe siècle. La conservation des éléments anciens dans une ville moderne (thèse de doctorat) (in French). Vol. I & II. Lille: Université de Lille.
- Mabire La Caille, Claire Mabire (1985). "Contribution à l'étude du rempart des Arcis à Tours". Bulletin de la Société archéologique de Touraine (in French). XLI: 135–157. ISSN 1153-2521. Archived from the original on 12 September 2024.
