= Chapel of Saint-Libert, Tours =

Former Romanesque church

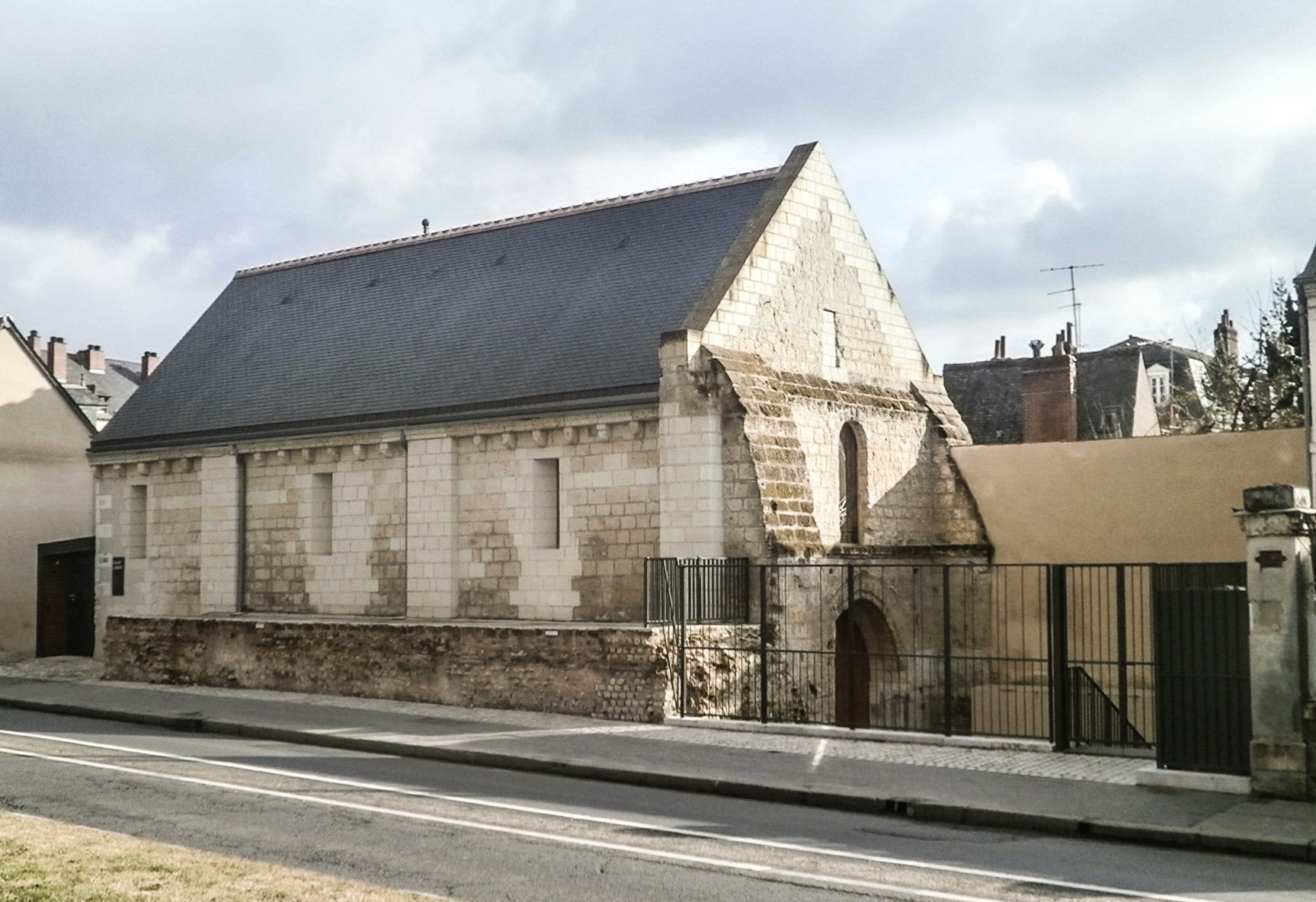
- Chapel and forecourt renovated (Feb 2017)
- Interactive map of Chapel of Saint-Libert, Tours
- Location: Tours, Indre-et-Loire
- Coordinates: 47°23′51″N 0°41′51″E
- Type: Roman
- Beginning date: 12th century
- Dedicated to: SAT headquarters
- Listed MH (1946)

The Chapel of Saint-Libert was a former Romanesque church dating from the 12th century. It was situated within the historic core of Tours, France. Its construction was partially influenced by the Gallo-Roman castrum along the Loire River, with which it shares a portion of the original rampart. The church's nave has been included in the supplementary inventory of historical monuments since December 2, 1946, at the initiative of the Archaeological Society of Touraine (SAT).

The church was decommissioned at the beginning of the 18th century. Subsequently, it was reconverted and disfigured by industrial and artisanal activity. In 2011, it was acquired by the SAT and rehabilitated following archaeological excavations. The rehabilitated church now serves as the SAT's headquarters, a reception and meeting space, and a venue for cultural events.

The edifice is situated at 37 Avenue André-Malraux, at the intersection of Rue de la Bretonnerie, close to Rue Barbès (formerly Rue Saint-Libert). Additionally, within the city of Tours, there was a modern Saint-Libert chapel, constructed in 1980, designated for Catholic worship and located at 9 Rue du Clos-Saint-Libert. However, this structure was scheduled for demolition in 2014 and, as such, should not be confused with the building mentioned above.

== Description ==
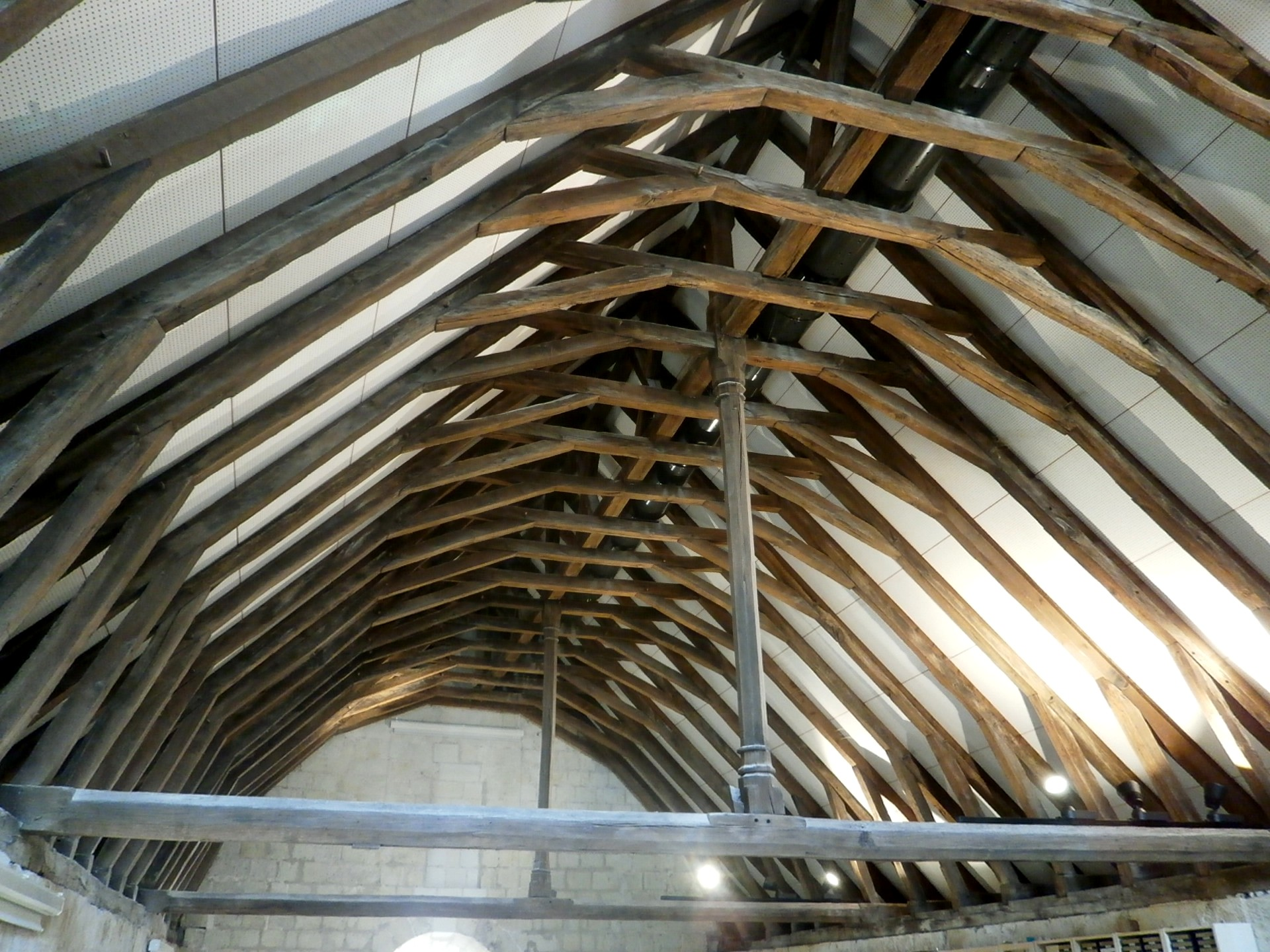
The chapel's roof structure dates from the 15th century.

The Romanesque building, constructed with meticulous precision, is reduced to its nave, as it lacks both a choir and a bell tower. The structure measures 17.50 meters (57.4 ft) (likely 24 meters or 79 feet originally, including the choir), 8.60 meters (28.2 ft) in width, and 10.15 meters (33.3 ft) in height before restoration (at least 2 meters or 6.6 feet taller with the original ground level restored). This results in an interior space measuring approximately 17 meters (56 ft) in length by 6.5 meters (21 ft) in width. The walls, constructed from tuffeau stone, have an average thickness of one meter. The building is equipped with buttresses, though the church is not vaulted in stone. The chapel features a beautiful wooden framework, rebuilt in the fifteenth century, with rafters forming twenty-seven oak trusses that resemble an inverted "ship's hull." The roof is covered with slate tiles. Two pointed arch portals, one situated to the south (which remains inaccessible) and one to the west, provide access to the chapel. The presence of reinforcements on the latter suggests the existence of a porch and an accentuated gable serving as a bell tower unless the latter was demolished. The two lateral facades with eaves are bordered by a cornice under the roof, which features moldings and sculpted modillions. These elements are particularly noteworthy on the north side, where they include human heads, women, monstrous figures, and geometric and vegetal ornaments. The structure is pierced by three windows, which were restored on the north side during the renovation. The windows are semicircular arches, composed of seven voussoirs. The more opulent south facade, which also contains an ecclesiastical lavabo dating from the Romanesque period, currently opens onto a private garden. The northern portal is situated on a portion of the remains of the city's Gallo-Roman wall. The decoration of the choir, which may have been the site of the most artistic interest in the building, and the interior layout, except for the location of the altar, remain unknown. Currently, a contemporary administrative module serves as a choir, increasing the available space.

== History ==
The church is situated in the northeast corner of the former Gallo-Roman city walls, forming part of the castrum of the ancient city of "Caesarodunum," which is believed to have been the first settlement in Tours. In addition to the chapel's foundations, other remnants of these ancient Late Roman Empire fortifications can be found at the Château de Tours, the Musée des Beaux-Arts, and along the streets of Port Feu Hugon and Petit Cupidon. This chapel, which bears a misleading name given its original size, replaced an older church whose date of construction is not definitively known. It was erected on a site where it was previously unclear whether worship had already taken place. Despite the excavations and archaeological work conducted in the early 21st century, the history of this chapel remains obscure and uncertain.

=== The church attested in the 9th century ===
At the time when Tours was still divided, a charter from 919 makes mention of a church on what is believed to be the current site. This charter refers to a land exchange that took place between 866 and 877 between the canons of Saint-Martin, who were mainly housed in the new western part of the city. The aforementioned charter refers to a plot of land located in the aforementioned part of the city, including a church, an enclosure wall, and a postern, which was transferred to the Count of Tours, Hugh the Abbot, for the benefit of the Count, covering approximately 3,600 m^{2} (39,000 sq ft).

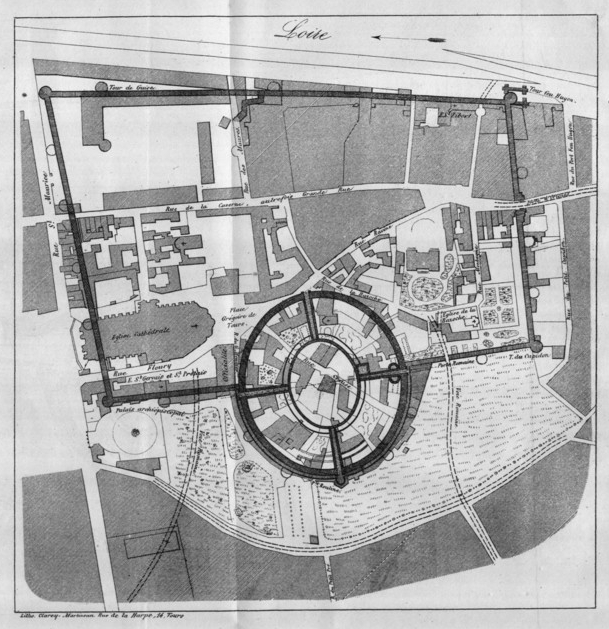
The Saint-Libert chapel to the north-east of the Gallo-Roman castrum near the Tour Feu Hugon

It is proposed that this property exchange, for which the deed is no longer extant, constituted the first chapel of the Counts of Tours, situated in the vicinity of the Tour Feu Hugon, which was likely their inaugural residence. (Note: This hypothesis is derived from the 919 text and an earlier one dated 869, in which King Charles the Bald, with the support of Pope Adrian, called upon the cities situated along the Loire to fortify themselves against the Vikings by constructing square towers. To illustrate: de Clérambault, É. G (1907–1908). "La tour Hugon et le château de Tours in Bulletin de la Société archéologique de Touraine (BSAT)". L. Péricat (in French). XVI: 237 & 243.; Giraudet (1873). Histoire de la ville de Tours (in French). Vol. 1. pp. 80–81. - "La Tour Feu Hugon. La première demeure des comtes de Tours". lesptitesbouch.org (in French). Archived from the original on September 17, 2024.)

The available evidence is limited, but if we assume that this is the location of the current chapel, which is known to abut the Gallo-Roman wall of the ancient city, and that the monks owned the land supporting the chapel at this spot, which is far from Martinpôle (Châteauneuf), where the monks are normally established, we must consider the reasons for this. The answer may be found in Canon 8 of the council held in 465 in Vannes, on the occasion of the ordination of its bishop by the bishop of Tours, Perpetuus, when Tours was the archdiocese and the capital of the Third Lyonnaise province of Gaul. This 5th-century canonical provision permitted abbots, as an exception, to have a refuge within the city's walls due to Viking incursions. This refuge, where the monks would have erected a chapel or reinforced an existing one, would have been exchanged once the danger had passed, with the understanding that Hugues l'Abbé held both the title of Abbot of Saint-Martin and Count of Tours.

However, very little is known about the existing church attested in the 9th century, thus dating from the Carolingian period, possibly already dedicated to Libert, recognized as a saint by his contemporary Gregory of Tours in the 6th century. There is no certain information regarding its location or time, nor what possibly preceded it.

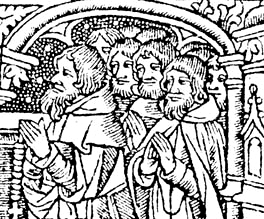
Monks at prayer in the Middle Ages

The available evidence does not provide any insight into the existence and date of a potential oratory refuge constructed during the Low Empire period (between the 5th and 6th centuries) by the monks of Saint-Martin and Marmoutier (where Libert is believed to have lived). (Note: Grégoire de Tours, who died in 594, mentions only three churches in the city: cathedral; Notre-Dame church; Saint-Gervais church - "Ancienne église Saint-Libert". patrimoine-de-france.com (in French). Archived from the original on September 27, 2024. whose source could be: Mabille, Émile (1864). "Notice sur les divisions territoriales et la topographie de l'ancienne province de Touraine". Bibliothèque de l'école des chartes (in French). 25 (25): 322–323.) Additionally, there is a lack of information concerning the dedication of the site to Saint Libert, which could have occurred as early as the 7th century, or as late as the 9th or 12th centuries. (Note: The cult of this saint is thought to have originated soon after his death, probably in the 7th century, as evidenced by his mention in litanies and the Roman Martyrology. ("Historique de la Chapelle Saint-Libert (SAT)" (in French). Archived from the original on March 1, 2023.)) Moreover, there is a dearth of information regarding the subsequent construction of the Carolingian church, which was documented during the period of the exchange (between the 8th and 9th centuries). Additionally, there is a paucity of evidence concerning the existence of Roman structures that may have preceded this period.

The current location of the chapel within the ancient city is a plausible hypothesis given its antiquity. However, no other evidence, beyond its encroachment on the Gallo-Roman wall, has been identified to confirm this presumption. Modern excavations have not yielded sufficient evidence to formally support the hypothesis, as they did not reveal significant remains of earlier constructions suggested by historians. Only some traces, later than expected, possibly dating to the end of the Carolingian period, have been found.

=== The current 12th-century church, preserved by its secular reconversion ===
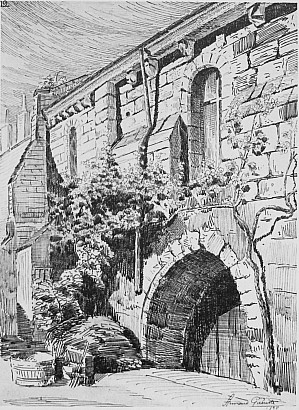
The rich south facade of the Saint-Libert chapel and its entrance portal, already condemned in the 19th century (SAT)

A clear and direct reference to a place of worship dedicated to "Saint-Libert," also known as the "oratory of Saint-Léobard" (the Latin name for Libert), is only documented in the 12th century. This information was first reported by Jean Mann in the 17th century. He refers to a deed of sale from 1192, which specifies that the oratory had been established by the vendor's forebears. Given the Romanesque architectural style of the extant chapel, it can be reasonably inferred that this is the same edifice, which would have undergone reconstruction at some point between its initial construction and the present. This would situate its construction in approximately 1150. However, the original state of the building and its architectural history remain unknown.

It is known that the chapel was previously under the ownership of the Counts of Tours. However, it subsequently became part of the domain of the Kings of France, as evidenced by documents from the 14th, 17th, and 18th centuries. (Note: A record submitted to the King in 1394 makes mention of the Saint-Livart alms, while another record submitted in 1674 states that the Saint-Libert Church was under the King's authority due to his castle in Tours. The fief had been alienated by the Abbot of Preuilly.) Nevertheless, its history was marked by turbulence. It was initially a dependency of the Abbey of Preuilly, which was then owned by laypeople. It was eventually given to the Oratorian priests at the beginning of the 17th century. (Note: In 1859, Alfred Giraud documented that the chapel was designated as a dependency of the cathedral, with an annual station made there every Friday before Palm Sunday.) In 1705, it was deconsecrated and subsequently converted for private industrial use. Despite the damage caused, this conversion likely ensured its survival.

In the eighteenth century, up until the mid-nineteenth century, the chapel was utilized for the processing of saltpeter, including the extraction of tuffeau stone for the manufacture of gunpowder. During the reign of Louis XIV, Touraine was the second-largest supplier of the product in the kingdom. The chapel was initially sold to the Chaslon family, proprietors of France's most substantial saltpeter factory situated in the Touraine region, who also exploited the Hugon Tower site. In 1788, the property was purchased from its previous owners by the Estevou family, who were also engaged in the manufacture of saltpeter. This occurred after the bankruptcy of the previous proprietors. In 1853, the property was acquired by Urbain Marnay, an artisan carpenter who utilized it as a wood warehouse. In 1875, the chapel was leased by his heirs to a soft drinks manufacturer, subsequently to a liqueur producer, and ultimately to a canned food factory, which purchased the property in 1922. It is also possible that the building was used for mushroom cultivation. From 1968 onwards, it was used as a garage and storage space. In 1980, it became the property of an architect, who sold it in 1989 to Henri Lhote, a grocer who used it as a warehouse.

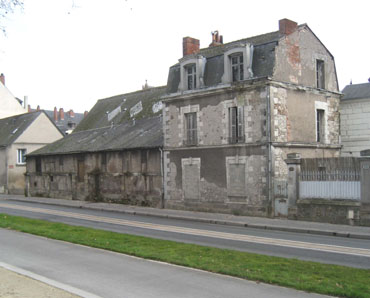
Original state of the Saint-Libert chapel in 2011 before restoration, with the house destroyed later

The chapel, which has been obscured and altered by the construction of sheds and a separate dwelling on its forecourt since the nineteenth century, is in a state of disrepair. In May 2011, the SAT purchased the property for €180,000. This was a logical outcome for a building that the SAT had already identified in 1859 as one of the local heritage treasures to be preserved, and which had been listed as a historical monument in 1946. Currently, it is one of the few remaining Romanesque chapels in the Touraine region.

== Clearing, excavations, and archaeological findings ==
=== Opening up and organizing excavations ===
The rescue of the chapel, which had not been subject to any protection measures since its 1946 registration, commenced in the second half of 2011 with preliminary operations, an archaeological diagnostic, as well as viability work, and the clearance of the area. This resulted in the demolition of the derelict structure, which was owned by the municipality and situated on the parvise of the chapel, as well as part of the northern shed roof. Over time, the chapel emerged from the encroaching shadows of the indistinct shed, gradually revealing its true form. A sample was taken for dendrochronological analysis to better ascertain the age of the frame.

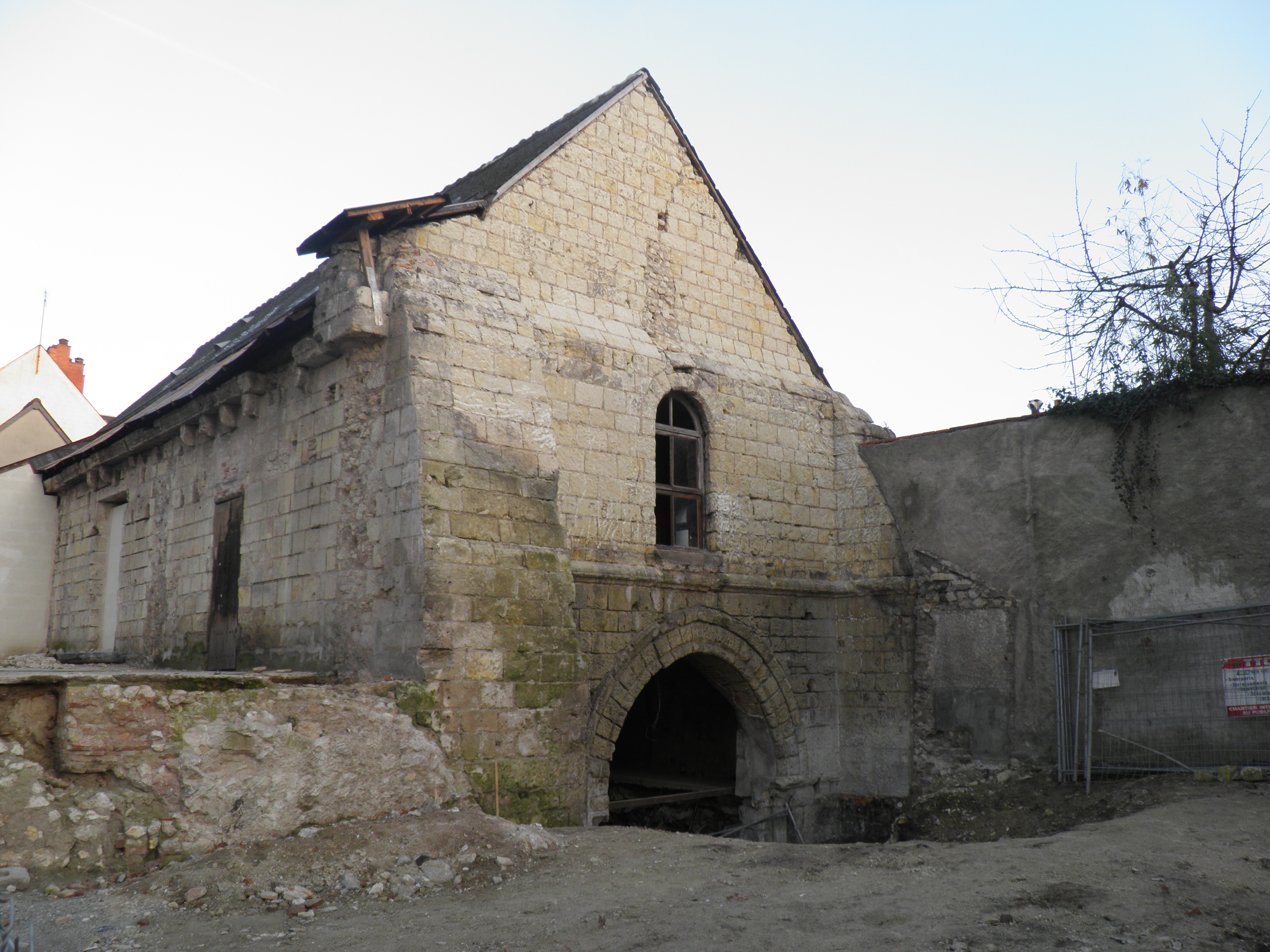
The entrance to the Saint-Libert chapel has already been opened up and is currently being renovated (March 2012).

The excavations, conducted by three archaeologists provided free of charge by the Archaeological Service of the Indre-et-Loire Departmental Council (SADIL), were conducted in three phases and were coordinated by Samuel Riou. The excavations were conducted in three phases between November and December 2011, September and December 2012, and March and May 2013. At the outset of the project, a backhoe was employed to dislodge the working slab of the old saltpeter factory, thereby facilitating the archaeologists' ability to remove approximately 2 meters (6.6 ft) of accumulated fill and expose the original floor level of the chapel. The necessity to expand circulation routes and safeguard against flooding, coupled with the redevelopment of the Loire wharves in the 18th and 19th centuries, resulted in the alignment of residential properties and extensive fills that had notably covered the chapel's floor and forecourt, significantly raising its level. Upon examination, a considerable number of fragments of faience and ceramics (approximately 2,500 shards) were discovered, providing evidence of nearby artisanal activity and enabling the various stratifications to be dated. The initial phase of the excavations permitted specialists from the General Council to establish a preliminary archaeological diagnosis, described as preventive, of the chapel and its forecourt. Subsequently, the Regional Archaeological Service (SRA) of the DRAC - Orléans issued directives to the SAT concerning future work. The excavations, which were confined to the chapel and limited in depth (with an average of 2.5 meters or 8.2 feet below the 20th-century level, with a few deeper excavations), were concluded on-site in May 2013.

=== Archaeological findings: between pleasant surprises and disappointments ===
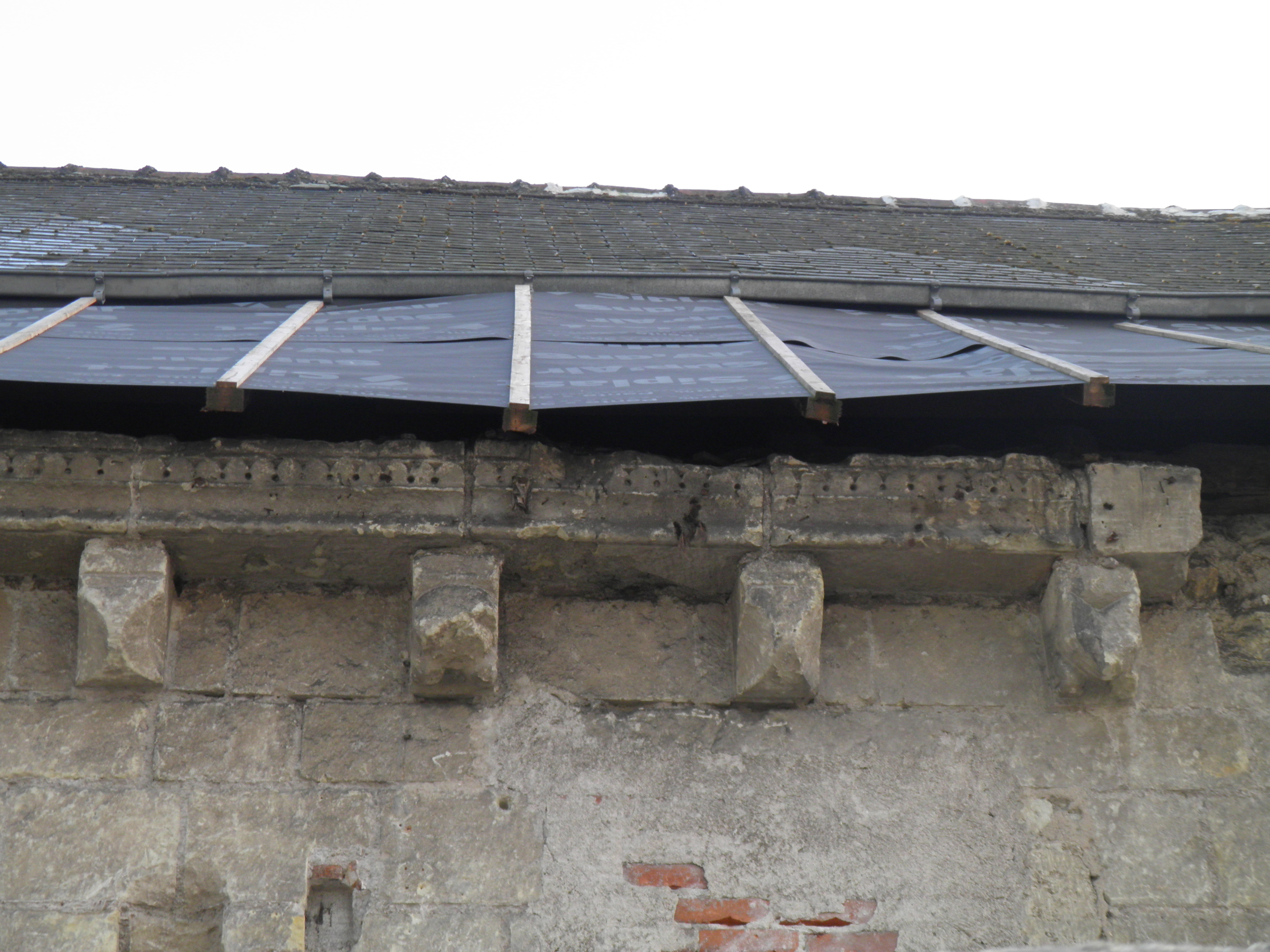
The eaves of the north façade, the most damaged, with its modillions, less elaborate than on the south facade

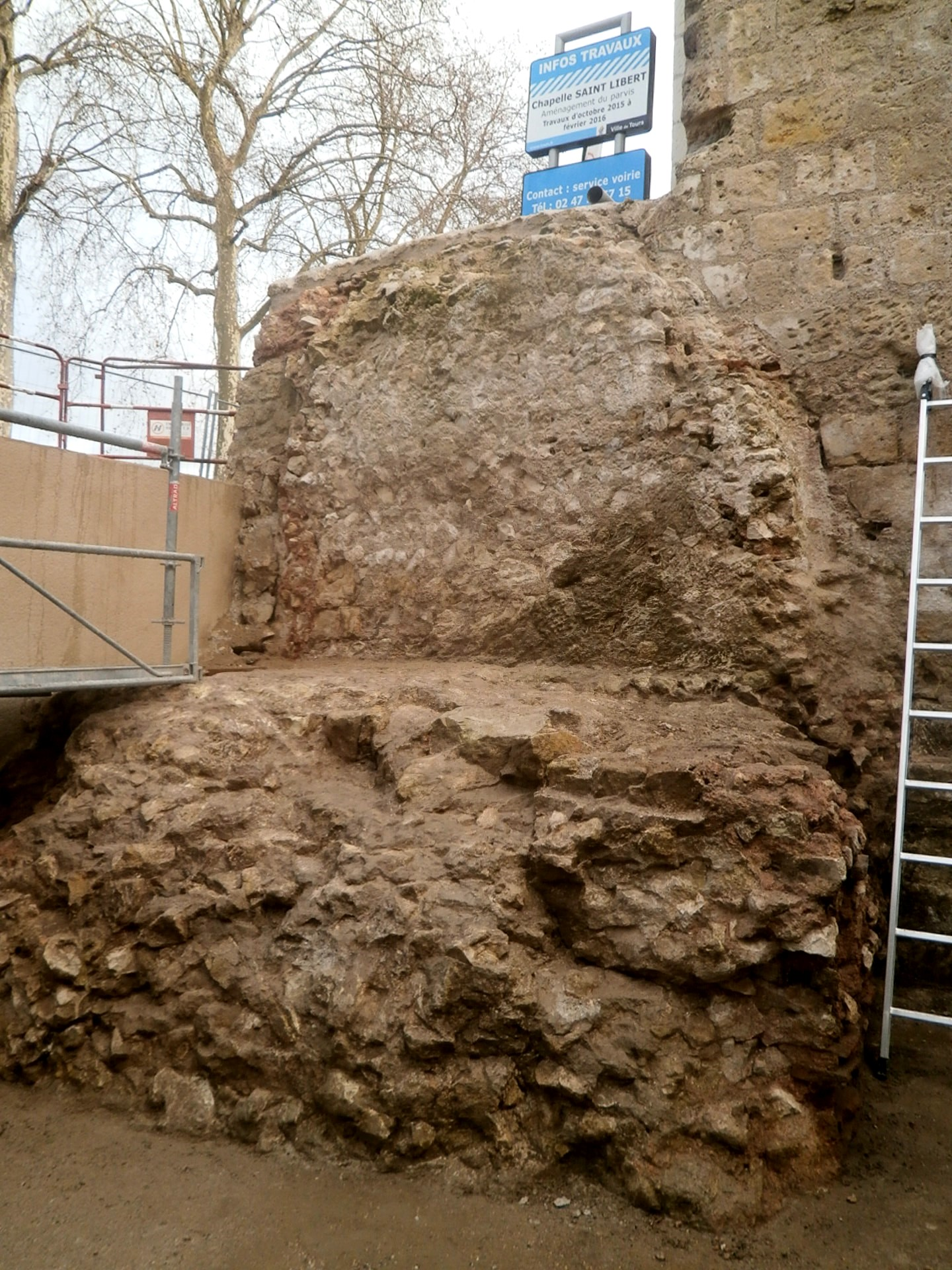
Overview of the dimensions of the Gallo-Roman enclosure that forms the foundation of the chapel's north facade

The archaeological diagnosis from the General Council Services provided some initial information. Additionally, the study of the building revealed careful construction with a Romanesque appearance; some details suggest it dates more to the late 12th century. (Note: In his 1859 report to the SAT, Alfred Giraud reached a different conclusion. He observed that specific architectural elements (ogives, modillions, and upper arches) and the absence of ledges indicated a date for the chapel in the early 12th century. However, the slight break in the arches of the two portals suggested a later date.) The frame was eventually dated to 1483. As for the general findings from the excavations, despite some positive results, the results were inconclusive, as many questions remain unanswered.

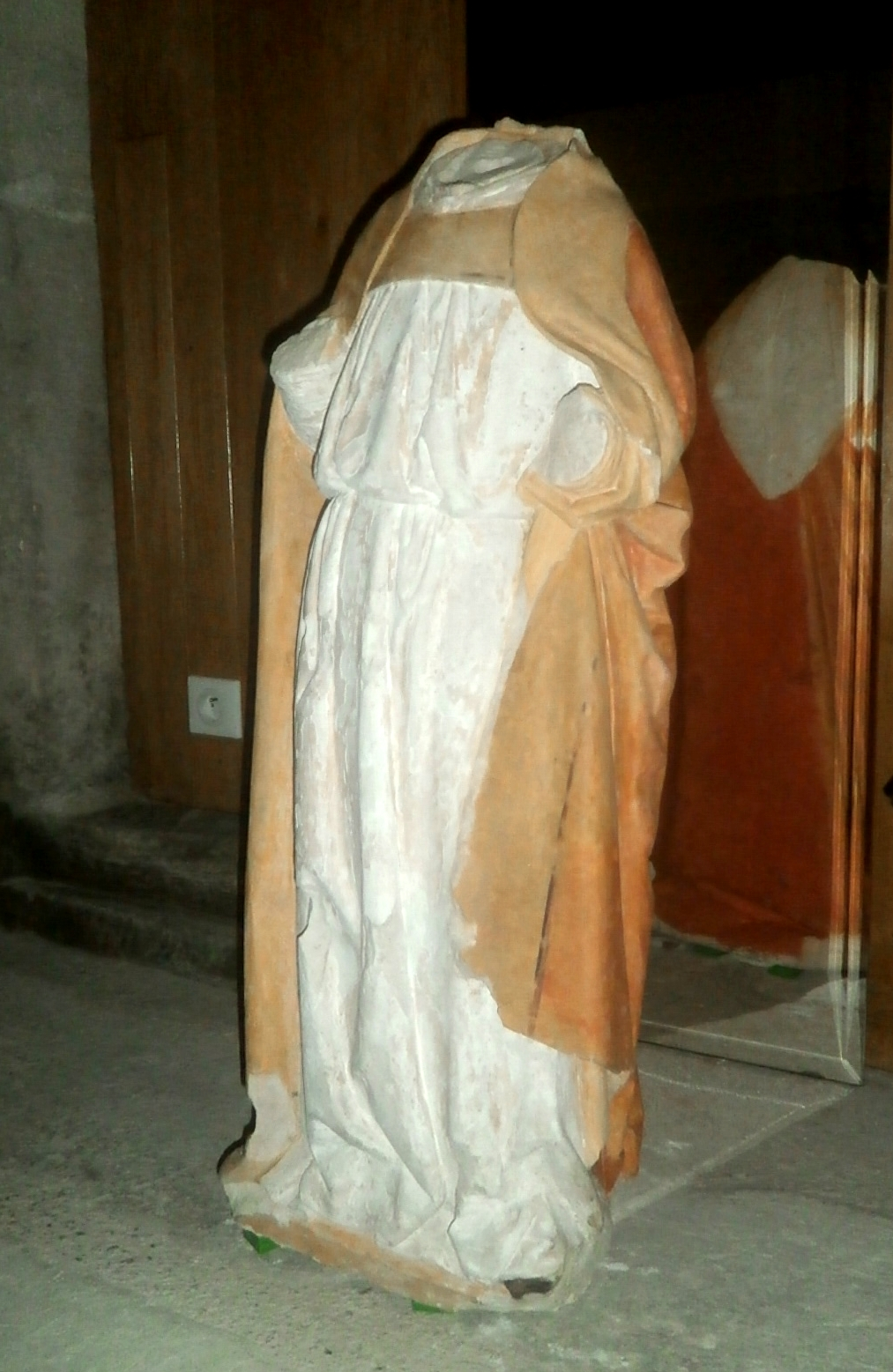
The decapitated statue of the bishop found during excavations

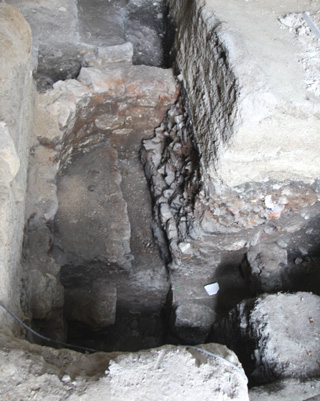
The remains of the bell furnace discovered during the excavations

Consequently, it is not possible to establish an unambiguous sequence of buildings on the site. Nevertheless, the excavations revealed the foundations of the altar and a choir barrier, which may date to the late Carolingian period, between 940 and 1020. This is considerably later than the church attested in the 9th century by the 919 text. At the very least, this confirms that the site was already dedicated to worship before the construction of the current chapel.

The archaeological evidence corroborates this hypothesis. The rediscovered altar, which appears to have been in situ since time immemorial, along with the bases of two columns predating the 12th century, a trace indicating the beginning of the apse, from which the chapel has been truncated, and a particularly noteworthy 90 cm (35 in) tall bishop statue, apparently buried there ritually in the 15th century, lying on its back, missing its head and hands, provide compelling evidence for this assertion. However, there is a paucity of evidence about the religious utilization of the site, except for its most recent funerary function. Forty graves were identified, probably belonging to the same notable family. The graves contained both adults and children, who had been carefully buried in shrouds. The graves are likely to date from the 16th century. However, it is not yet known which family they belong to, due to the lack of evidence. (Note: A limited number of objects were recovered, including a ring and bones, which were scheduled for analysis in Burgundy: "Article de la Nouvelle République, 28 septembre 2012" (in French). Archived from the original on September 27, 2024.) Some suggestions have been made regarding the identity of the family, but no definitive conclusion has been reached. (Note: The SAT president points out that the skeletons are found in small groups, of all ages, and stresses that the probable burial date corresponds to when the chapel was privately owned: "10 février 2015 - Interview du président de la SAT sur France Bleu" (in French). Archived from the original on June 7, 2015. According to Samuel Riou, excavation director, it could be César Forget, who was mayor of Tours and captain of the Château de Tours, or the Becquerel family, Touraine notaries.) A small anecdotal mishap occurred when a large-format photo of one of the skeletons was quickly stolen.

The discovery of the Gallo-Roman wall, estimated to be 5 meters (16 ft) high, 4 meters (13 ft) thick, and 14 meters (46 ft) long, elucidated the configuration of the castrum in this section of the city. However, the anticipated postern, associated with the exchange referenced in the 919 text, was not identified, as the wall had been dismantled in this region during the 19th century.

In addition to the ancient and medieval foundations, the bishop statue, a ring unearthed during the diagnostic phase, and the unexpected graves, the other noteworthy discovery from the excavations was the remains of a bell foundry. While such a structure is not uncommon, the purpose of this particular one remains unclear, given that the study of the chapel's structure suggests it never had a bell tower. This does not preclude the possibility (Note: Hypotheses have been put forward regarding the existence of a bell tower, either a pronounced gable serving this function or a bell-gable placed on the gable, which is otherwise abnormally thinned. ("Étude archéologique du bâti de la Chapelle Saint-Libert (SAT)" (in French). Archived from the original on January 20, 2011.)) unless one assumes that the founders were working for the current Tours Cathedral, which is in relative proximity and commenced reconstruction in 1170. Similarly, the motivation behind the replacement of the original frame remains unclear. However, the presence of buttresses lends credence to the hypothesis that a previous vault was constructed. Additionally, the date of the apse's destruction is uncertain. The apse possibly was destroyed during the widening of Rue de la Bretonnerie in the 19th century. Nevertheless, the form of the apse remains unknown, whether it was an apse or not.

The industrial use of the site resulted in the remaining of a boiler base, which was likely from the cannery, as well as notable damage to the interior walls that were directly utilized for saltpeter production. However, the lower part of the walls that were buried remained intact, and the buttresses that were originally present on the north facade were removed.

The preliminary phase of the site's rehabilitation was symbolically concluded with the interment of the 52 skeletons unearthed during the excavations on May 6, 2013. This ceremony was conducted with the blessing of the Archbishop of Tours, Monseigneur Aubertin.

== Rehabilitation ==
=== The project and its funding ===
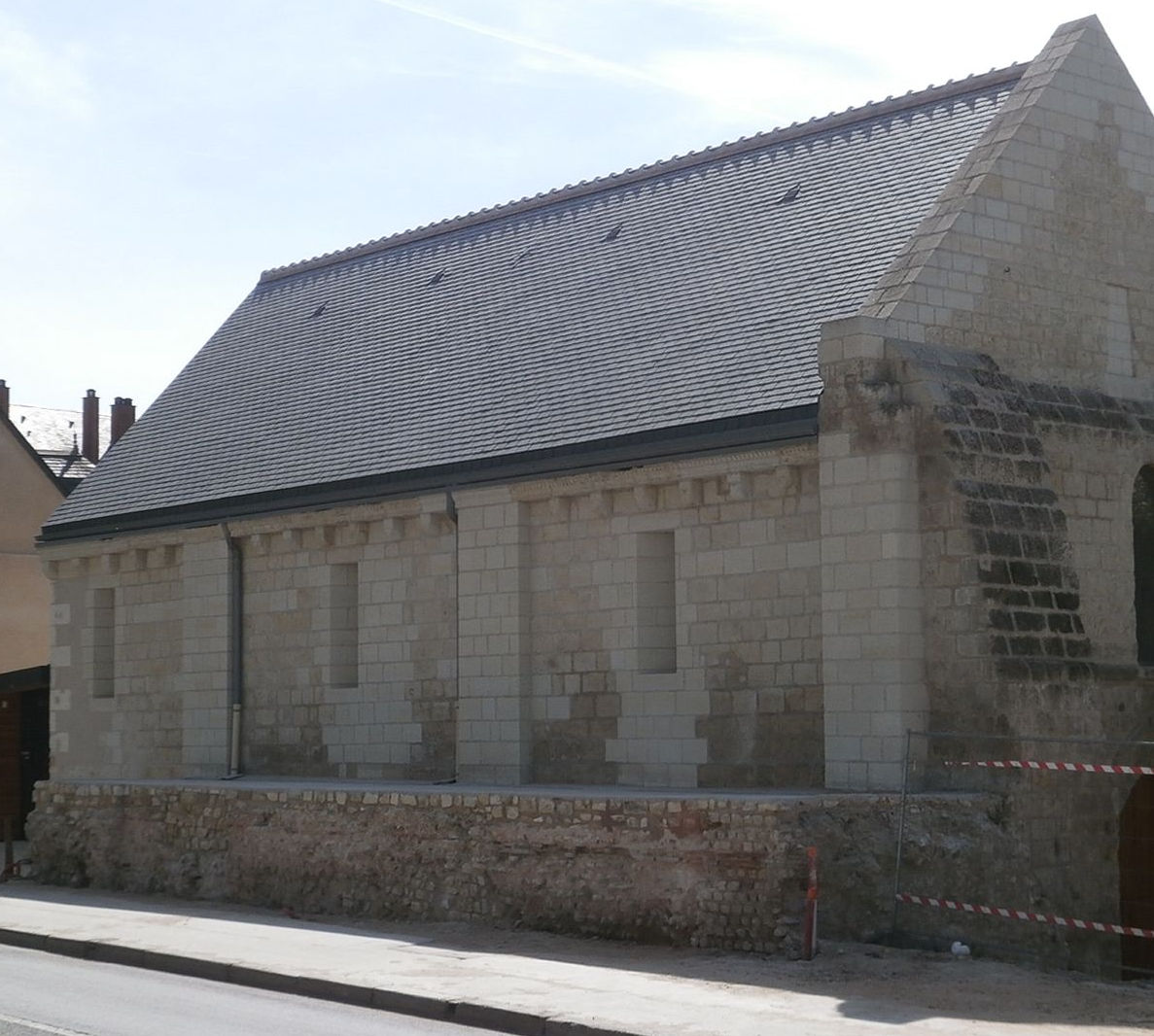
The renovated chapel with its Gallo-Roman base on which the north facade is built (April 2015).

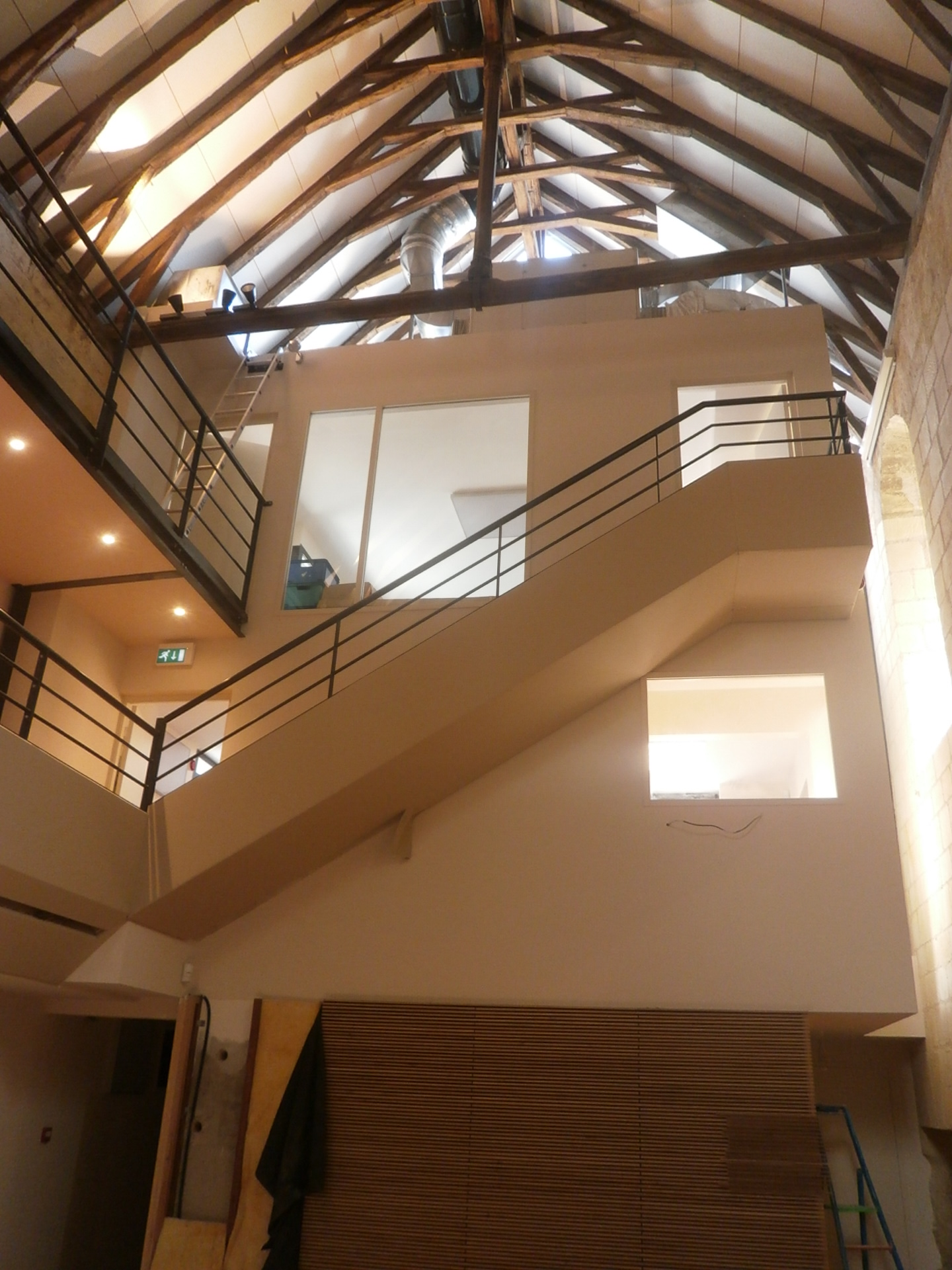
The east administrative module, seen from inside, and a glimpse of the two north galleries (left)

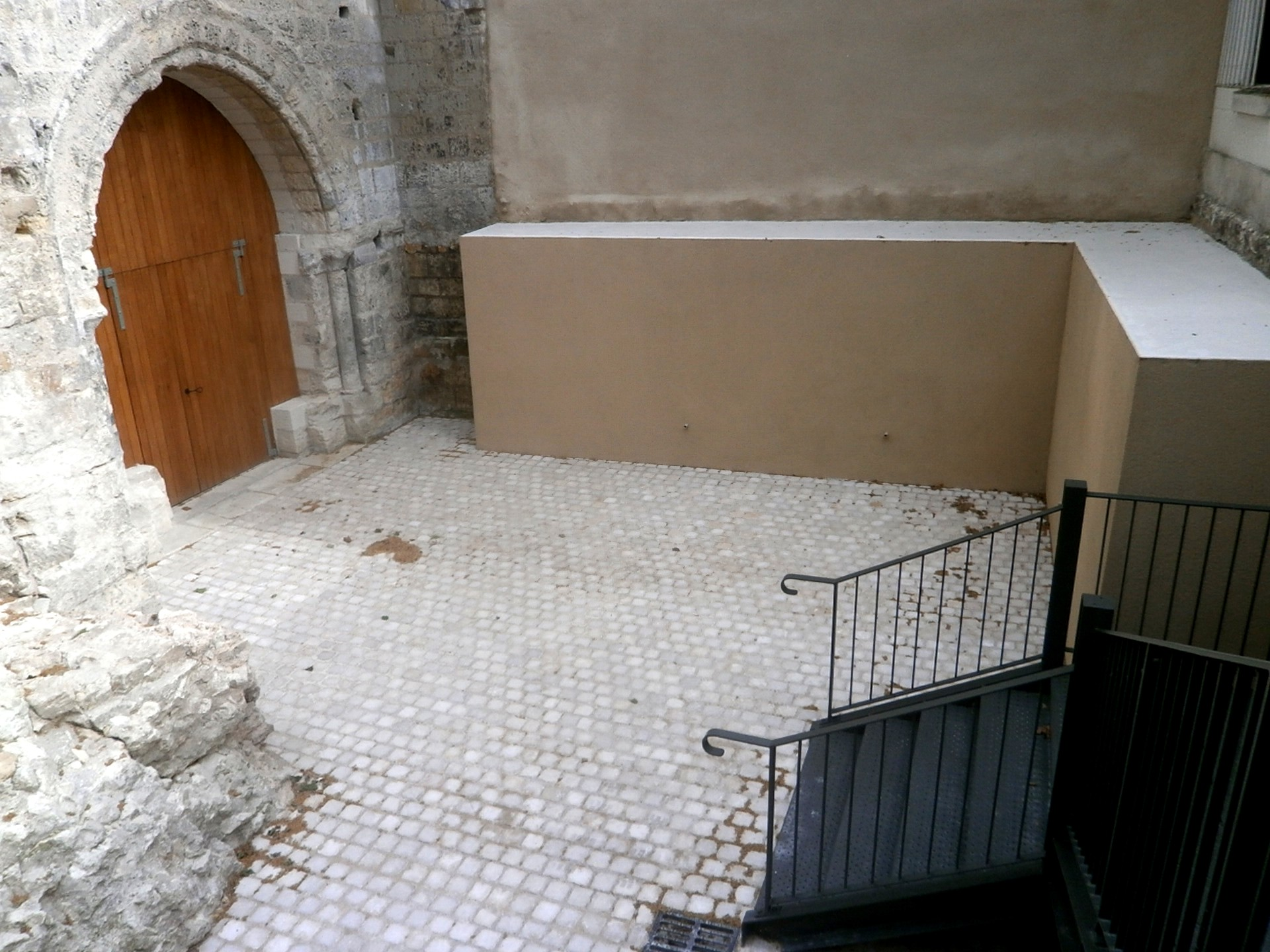
The new forecourt gives access below to the chapel's main west entrance (May 2016).

The final rehabilitation project sought to construct a functional edifice that would serve as the future headquarters for the SAT. The building was designed to include a meeting space and offices, a workspace for researchers with storage possibilities, and the capacity to host cultural events. Architect Philippe Tardits assumed the challenge of integrating the traditional with the contemporary. The existing structure has been preserved, renovated, and even completed (reconstruction of the northern buttresses), with its history showcased. The most significant archaeological discoveries will be safeguarded beneath contemporary glass protection and accessible to the public, including the bell foundry and the Gallo-Roman wall. The bishop statue will also be incorporated into the design. The western entrance will remain accessible thanks to a forecourt constructed by the city, with stairs leading to the original level. A striking contemporary module, potentially symbolizing the apse, will offer SAT functional office space on the east side.

The objective of this project, which was presented by SAT in 2010, was to raise funds, including from individuals, through the Fondation du patrimoine. The final cost of the project was €1,300,000, which was higher than the initial estimate of €1,200,000. The additional funds were provided by SAT through the reuse of the sale of the Jean Galland Hotel, which generated €655,000. Additionally, the project received financial contributions from the State and Parliamentary Reserve (€150,000), the Indre-et-Loire Departmental Council and the city of Tours (in-kind support), corporate sponsorships (€270,000), and public subscriptions, including donations from passionate individuals, occasionally anonymous. The subscription through the Heritage Foundation, which raised €258,000, constituted the second largest of its kind in France, surpassed only by the one for the restoration of the Lorraine Cross in Colombey-les-Deux-Églises.

=== Completion of rehabilitation and the birth of a "high-tech" cultural space ===
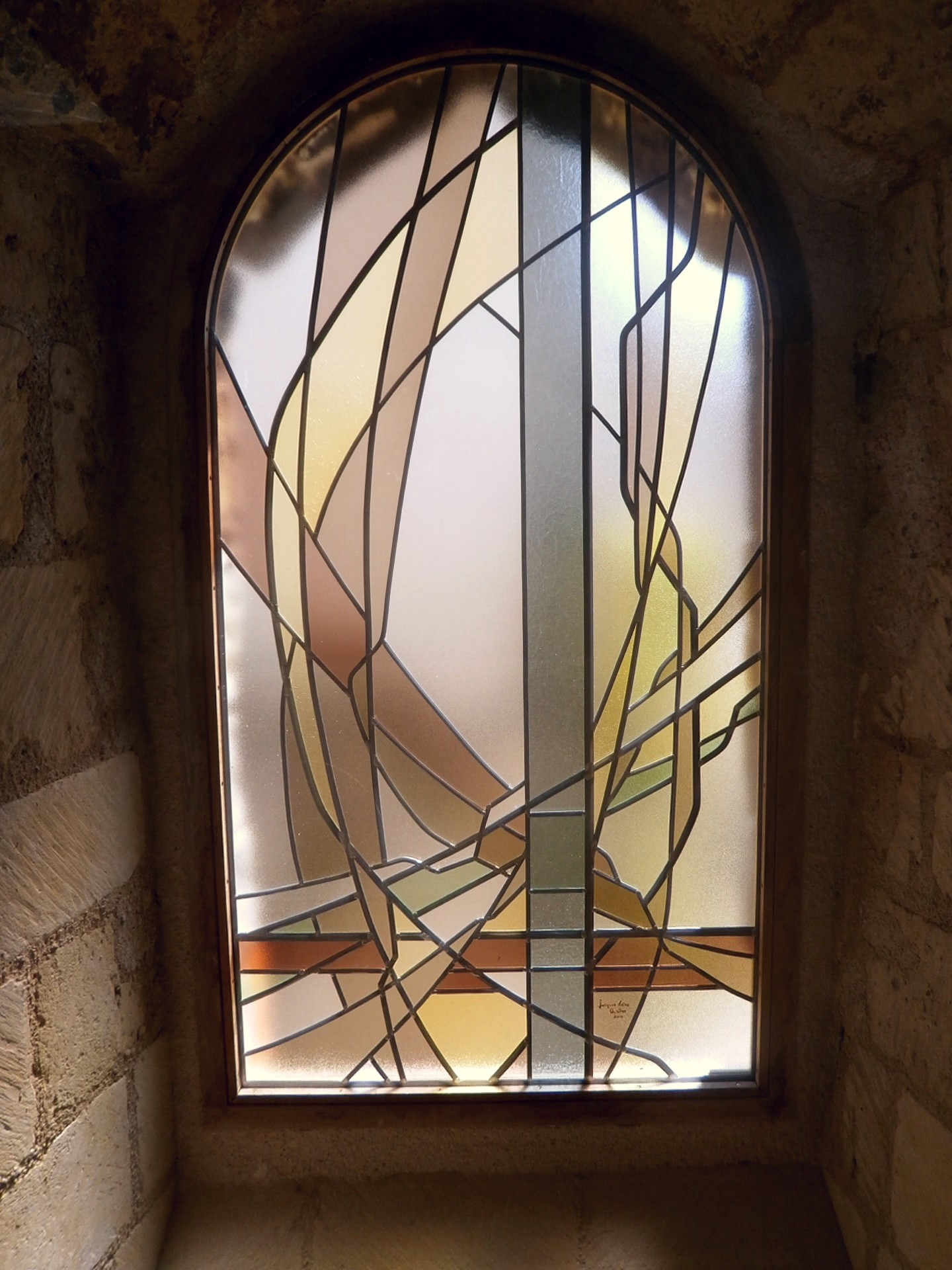
The stained glass windows have just been installed (May 2015). They illustrate the Loire River, on the banks of which the chapel is built.

In practice, the work commenced in February 2012 with the removal of the cement coating from the west tuffeau facade, which had been obscured by this material. From mid-2013 onwards, the entire building underwent a series of essential treatments and reconstructions, including the replacement of windows, modillions, and buttresses, as well as the restoration and completion of the roof. The latter had been altered by the destruction of the lean-to, which had altered its slope, and subsequently, the construction of the modern administrative module. The installation of the future heated floor slab, which once again sealed the tombs, constituted the initial phase of the interior work. With interior finishes (tiling and painting) and the enhancement of the exterior restored Gallo-Roman remains by the directives of the French Historic Buildings Architect, the rehabilitation concluded with the installation of modern thermoformed stained glass windows by Jacques Loire (Note: Its workshops are located in Lèves (near Chartres): "Official site" (in French). Archived from the original on April 5, 2021.) in the crossings in early May 2015. However, due to unforeseen circumstances, namely the postponement of the construction of the forecourt by the city of Tours (a sponsor), the inauguration was ultimately held on May 13, 2016. This was followed by an exhibition and musical performances in the chapel in the following days.

Before this, several visits had already been arranged, in addition to those provided by the SAT for its members. On May 20, 2015, the inaugural event was held in the chapel under the auspices of the Indre-et-Loire delegation of the Heritage Foundation. During this event, the Foundation bestowed its labels upon 37 project leaders. Additionally, the SAT's board of directors was scheduled to convene at the site on June 25, 2015. However, the SAT will probably persist in conducting its principal meetings in the room provided by the County Council.

The former chapel, which has been extended to a length of 19 meters (62 ft), a width of 7 meters (23 ft), and a height of 12 meters (39 ft), now serves as an optimal working, meeting, and archiving space for the SAT. In addition to offices, mezzanine galleries have been constructed on the north side, comprising two levels, for the storage of the SAT's collection of 13,000 glass plates.

Furthermore, the chapel has been transformed into a contemporary venue that can be leased for a variety of purposes, including conferences, exhibitions, concerts, and other cultural events. For example, a musical performance presented by the Francis Poulenc Academy took place there in February 2017, followed by a concert of Hungarian music in March 2017. To this end, the chapel is equipped with state-of-the-art video and audio systems, including a sophisticated array of speakers with a constant acoustic pressure system, all controlled by computer. The chapel offers 150 seats in an architectural space imbued with history, benefiting from the unique resonance of the ancient stones and the soft light emanating from the banks of the Loire. A small office is also available for the coordination of event logistics.

In light of the comprehensive restoration undertaken, the potential for renovating the lavishly embellished south facade, which currently overlooks a private garden, merits consideration. This renovation could encompass the construction of an English courtyard to reveal the original ground level, thereby restoring access via the central side portal.

A postage stamp was issued at the end of 2016 by the Tours Philatelic Union and the SAT, in collaboration with La Poste, to commemorate the chapel. In December 2012, the Academy of Sciences, Arts, and Letters of Touraine bestowed its annual accolade upon the SAT in recognition of its endeavors in the preservation of the Saint-Libert Chapel. This commendation serves to reinforce the "City of Art and History" designation that the city of Tours has held since 1988, situated at the core of the Loire Valley, a UNESCO World Heritage Site.

== Bibliography ==
- Gasnault, Pierre (1961). "Le tombeau de saint Martin et les invasions normandes dans l'histoire et dans la légende". Revue d'histoire de l'Église de France (in French). 47 (144): 51–66. doi:10.3406/rhef.1961.3266. Archived from the original on September 27, 2024.
- Giraud, Alfred (1859). Église Saint-Libert. Rapport présenté à la Société (in French). Vol. 11. Guillaund-Verger, Tours: Mémoires de la Société Archéologique de Touraine. pp. 118–121. Archived from the original on March 1, 2023.
- Gorry, Jean-Michel (2012). "Qui était saint Libert ? Vie de Léobard par Grégoire de Tours". Bulletin de la Société Archéologique de Touraine (in French). LVIII. Tours: 121–126.
- Gorry, Jean-Michel (2012b). "Les origines de la chapelle Saint-Libert : nouvel examen des sources écrites antérieures au XIIe siècle". Bulletin de la Société Archéologique de Touraine (in French). LVIII. Tours: 127–138.
- Jeanson, Denis (1973). "Église Saint-Libert". Sites et monuments du grand Tours (in French). Tours: l'Astragale.
- Maan, Jean (2000). Histoire de l'église de Tours (in French). Translated by Letort, Paul. Éditions du Python. ISBN 2911020111.
- Mabille, Émile (1864). "Notice sur les divisions territoriales et la topographie de l'ancienne province de Touraine". Bibliothèque de l'école des chartes (in French). 25 (25): 322–323. Archived from the original on September 27, 2024.
- Riou, Samuel; Dufaÿ, Bruno (2016). Le site de la chapelle Saint-Libert dans la cité de Tours, Mémoire LXXIII de la Société archéologique de Touraine - 61e supplément à la Revue archéologique du centre de la France (in French). Tours: FERACF. ISBN 978-2-91327-247-7.
