= Feu Hugon tower =

Tower in Tours

Coordinates: 47.3971°N 0.6982°E

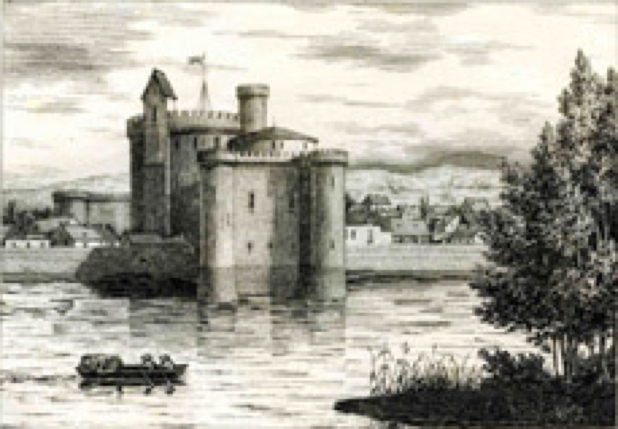
- Romanesque view of the tour Feu Hugon (Georg Hoefnagel – 15th century)
- Interactive map of Feu Hugon tower
- Location: Tours, Indre-et-Loire, France
- Type: Medieval fortress
- Beginning date: circa 875
- Dismantled date: 18th century

The Feu Hugon tower, now demolished, is presumed to be the first medieval residence of the Counts of Tours, built around 875, although it may be later and distinct from the Palais Comtal (below), all located in the northeast corner of the ancient Gallo-Roman Cité.

== Historical overview ==
Originally a large tower described as rectangular, it was later reinforced by a number of outbuildings, and then by another square tower called Saint-Antoine (around the 15th century), further to the north, all on the left bank of the Loire, in the northeast corner of Tours' ancient Gallo-Roman city walls, near present-day Saint-Pierre-des-Corps. However, little is known about the architecture of the site, mainly through uncertain iconography, and nothing about its interior layout. Its history and chronology are equally uncertain.

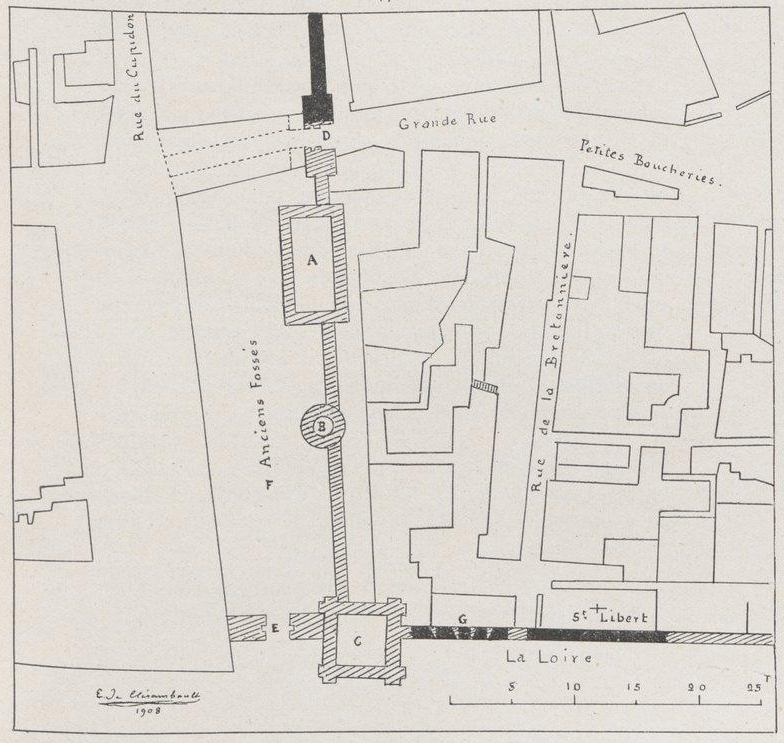
The Tour Hugon (A), the square tower (C) in the northeast corner of the Gallo-Roman castrum and the Saint-Libert chapel, from an 18th-century plan (according to de Clérambault).

=== The towers' defensive vocation ===
A possible justification for the construction of a tower can be found in a text from 869, in which Charles le Chauve calls for protection after the Norman invasion, and asks all cities in the Loire Valley to build square towers, which also meets with the approval of Pope Adrian. Count Hugh the Abbot (from whom it is deduced the etymology of the tower) therefore undertook the construction of the building – supposedly the Tour Hugon – which was completed in 878, according to de Clérambault's previously accepted thesis.

All or part of this complex may have been built on a plot of land he acquired at the same time, which also included a church and a postern, given to the Count by the canons of Saint-Martin in exchange for a similar plot of land (around 3,600 m2). The church, which would have become that of the Counts of Tours, would have preceded the present-day chapel of Saint-Libert, which still stands, presumably on the same site.

The tower, some ten meters high and facing east, was protected to the south by a drawbridge, and rested on the "Porte d'Orléans", which controlled the eastern entrance to the "Grande Rue", the main thoroughfare crossing Tours from east to west; it was surrounded by a wide moat that ran along the eastern perimeter wall, as far as the Loire and the Tour Saint-Antoine, with which it was often confused, which may explain why the name "Tour Hugon" was extended to all the buildings. Near the east side of the square tower was a sluice gate, which was closed during floods. In the absence of definite plans, some representations may seem to diverge on the distance between the towers, which, with a compact alignment perspective, appear to falsely form a homogeneous whole.

According to S. Riou and B. Dufaÿ, it nevertheless seems certain that the Palais Comtal, seat of the count's jurisdiction, occupied the northeastern part of the city, resting on the banks of the Loire, and was thus clearly distinguishable from the tower known today as the Tour Hugon, located closer to the Porte d'Orléans. The Tour Hugon could therefore be attributed to Hugues de Sainte-Maure in the early xi century, rather than to Hugues L'Abbé in the ix century, which has the advantage of not radically calling into question the etymology of the tower but would explain the possible confusion.

Tradition, supported by the legal claims of the descendants (infra) and rare texts of uncertain interpretation, nevertheless locates the residence of the counts on the site where the Tour Hugon was erected until the 11th century, when Tours castle was built, in the opposite corner of the Gallo-Roman castrum (north-west), at the mouth of the new bridge over the Loire: the Pont d'Eudes.

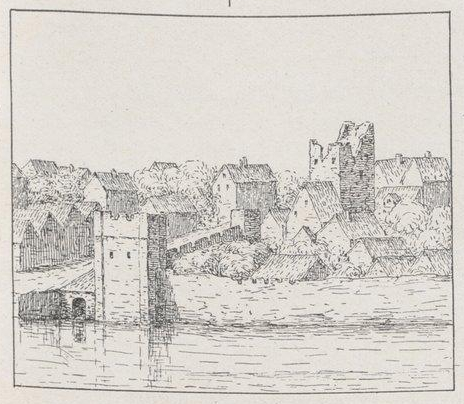
The Tour Hugon complex, including the heavily damaged large tower (in the background), resting on the Gallo-Roman enclosure, in the 11th century (reconstruction by C. Vischer and H. Piccart).

=== The decline of towers ===
Damaged and repaired several times, the tower was poorly maintained. As early as the 13th century, the Hugon tower was used only as a watchtower. In 1423, however, it was armed with a cannon, and two years later, a bell was placed in the belfry above the tower to sound the alarm. It lost all military interest in the 16th century, when its condition deteriorated dramatically. In the meantime, the ruined tower had temporarily served as a cage for a lion, presented to Louis XII in 1498 on the occasion of his solemn entry into the city of Tours.

Much of the Tour Hugon was demolished between 1635 and 1637. In 1703, the demolition of what remained of the tower was granted by the town to Sieur Chaslon, who had already leased the land and wanted to extract saltpetre from it, as he had already done on the site of the Saint-Libert chapel; the Duc de Luynes brought a lawsuit which ended in a settlement in 1734 in favor of the Chaslon heirs, who, as compensation, were required to erect a large stone pillar bearing a coat of arms and a reference to the fact that this was the seat of the viscounty. This pillar, which had been rebuilt in the meantime, in an area transformed into a garden, was definitively removed during the Revolution, but the Société archéologique de Touraine has had the plaque from it since 1862.

The Tour Saint-Antoine, equipped with battlements and machicolations, was bathed on one side in the Loire and on the other in the moat, and was also armed with cannons. It was later used by a thrift shop and as a retreat for people of ill repute, and was destroyed in 1779 when the quays were built. The round turret flanking the eastern enclosure, between the two large towers, had already been demolished at the turn of the century.

== Etymological legends ==
The etymology of the term "Huguenot" and its relationship to the Feu Hugon tower is a matter of some debate.

It has been claimed that the Huguenots who took refuge in Tours in large numbers took their name from the fact that they met not far from the Hugon tower. By the nineteenth century, this very local etymological theory was no longer current, even if the Genevan origin currently accepted is only presumed.

During the two centuries in which the Hugon fortress fell into disrepair, it had a gloomy appearance. Until its demolition, it was customary to fear the evil ghost of the Count, known as "King Hugon" (or Hugonet), who was imagined to prowl the town at night with a procession of demons, leading holy girls and children astray. Hence a variant of the previous etymological thesis, just as controversial in the case of the Huguenots, supposedly so named because they used to sneak off to preach at nightfall to the Hugon tower, just as the ominous shadow of King Hugon loomed over the city walls when darkness fell.

== See also ==
- Chapel of Saint-Libert, Tours
- Château de Tours

== Bibliography ==
- Agrippa d'Aubigné, Théodore. Histoire universelle (in French).
- Touchant-Lafosse, Georges. La Loire. Historique et pittoresque et bibliographique (in French). Pornin.
- Salmon, André. L'amphithéâtre romain de Tours d'après les chartes (in French). Bibliothèque de l'école des chartes.
- Giraudet, Eugène. Histoire de la Ville de Tours (in French). Éd. des Régionalismes-PyréMonde-Princi Negue. ISBN 978-2-84618-860-9.
- Loizeau, Charles (1902). Étymologie française du mot "huguenot" appliqué aux protestants de France, prouvée par des textes authentiques antérieurs à la Réforme (in French). Pericat.
- Clérambault, Édouard (1907). La tour Hugon et le château de Tours (in French). Bulletin de la Société archéologique de Touraine (BSAT).
- Riou, Samuel; Dufaÿ, Bruno (2016). Le site de la chapelle Saint-Libert dans la cité de Tours, Mémoire LXXIII de la Société archéologique de Touraine – 61e supplément à la Revue archéologique du centre de la France (in French). FERACF. ISBN 978-2-913272-47-7.
- Rouillac, Philippe (2012). La nef offerte en 1500 par les tourangeaux à la reine Anne de Bretagne : Mémoires de l'Académie des Sciences (PDF) (in French). Arts et Belles-Lettres de Touraine.
