= Château de Tours =

Castle in Tours, France

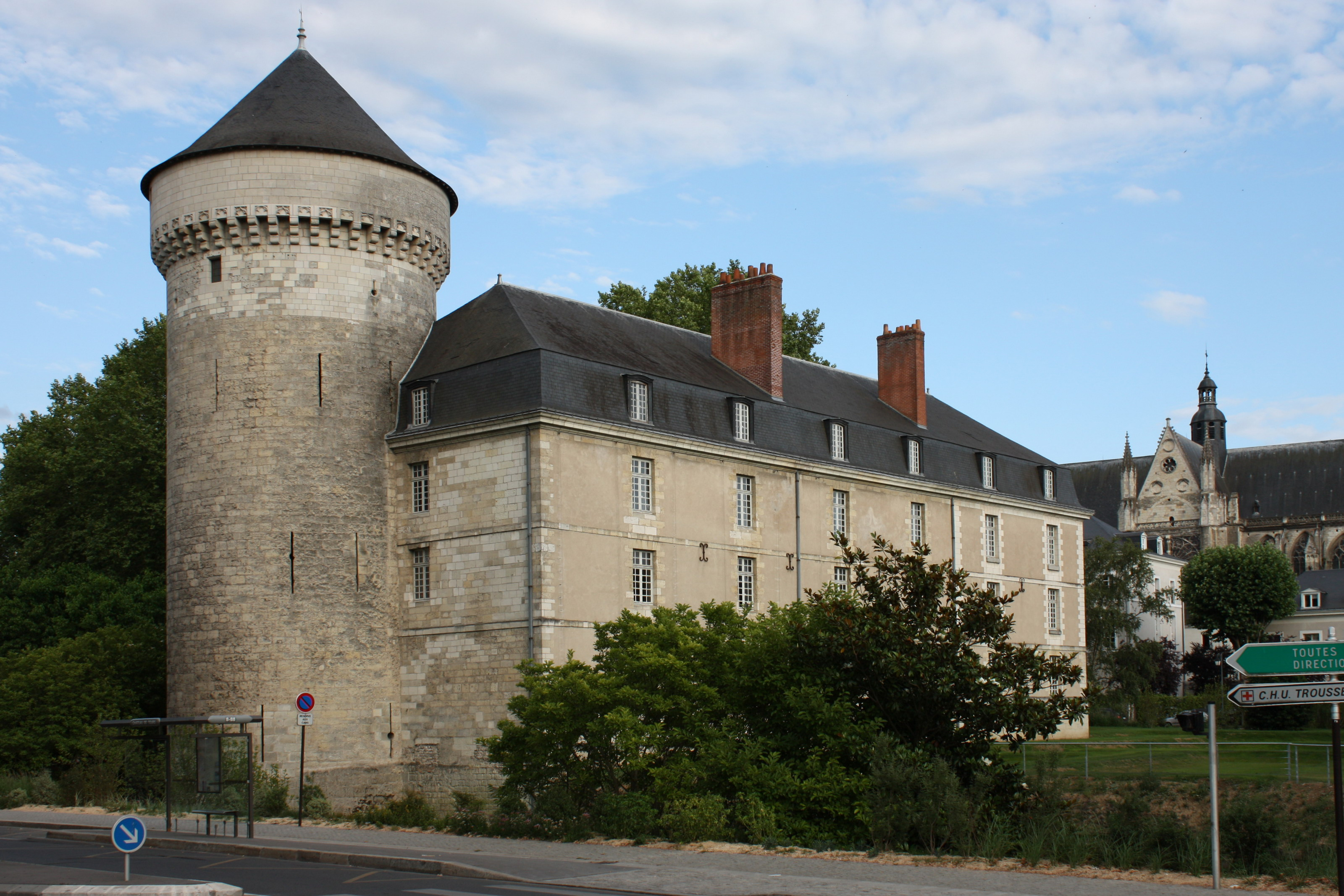
- Interactive map of the Château de Tours area

General information
- Location: 25 Avenue André Malraux, Tours, France
- Coordinates: 47.3971°N 0.6936°E
- Current tenants: Commune, State
- Construction started: 11th century

The Château de Tours is a castle located in Tours, Indre-et-Loire, France.

Built in the 11th century, the building features architecture of the Carolingian period, and was the residence of the Lords of France.

Until the 2000s, the Royal Castle of Tours was used as an aquarium where about 1,500 fish of 200 different species could be seen. It also served as Grévin museum. The castle was classified as monument historique on 20 August 1913.

Currently, the building houses contemporary exhibitions of paintings and photographs (organized by Le Jeu de Paume), including works by Joan Miró, Daniel Buren, Nadar, Robert Capa.
