= Léon Palustre =

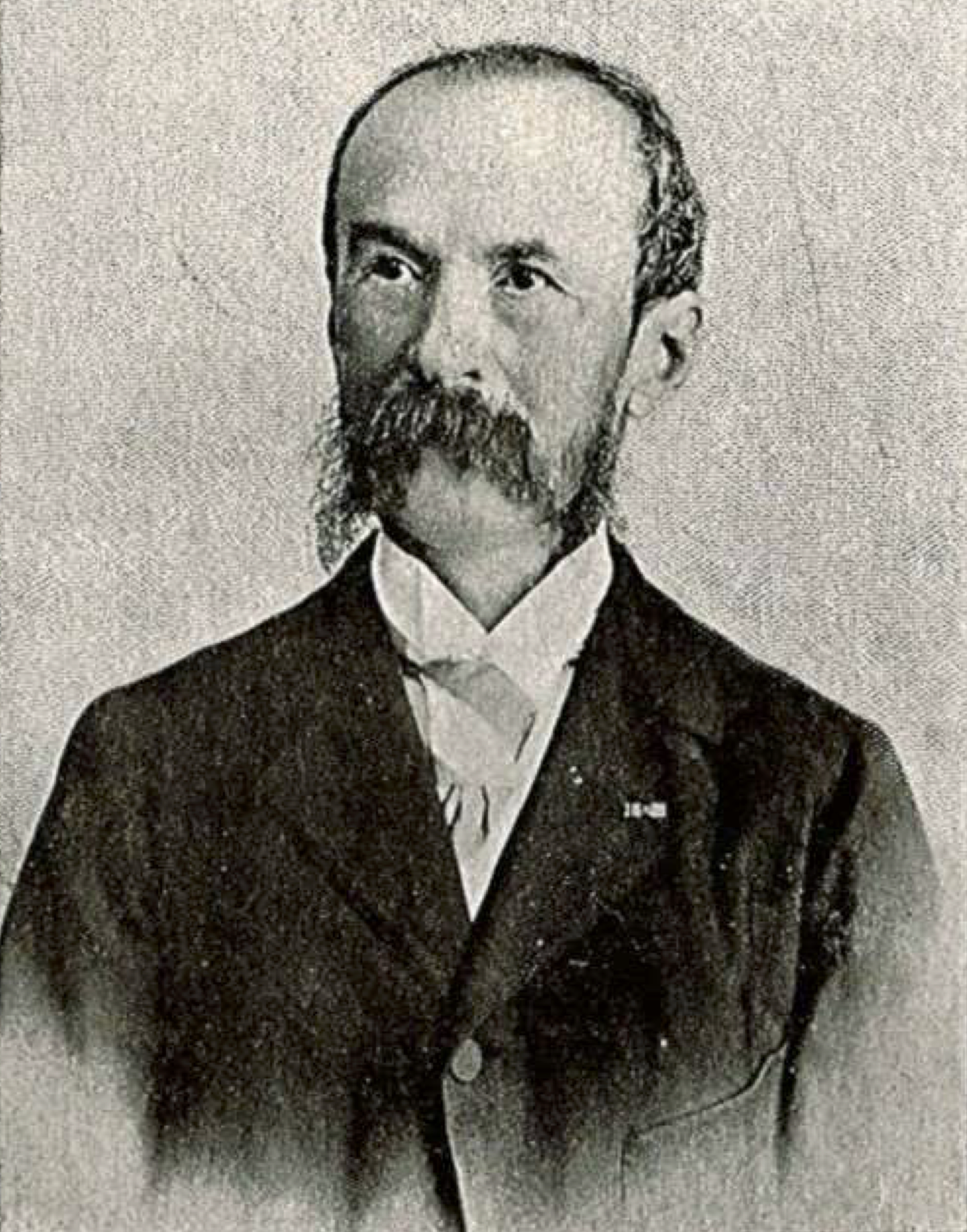
Portrait.

Louis Marie Léon Palustre de Montifaut (4 February 1838 – 26 October 1894) was a French archaeologist.

His nephew Bernard Palustre (1870–1907) was a palaeographic archivist.

== Life ==
He was born to infantry captain François Léon Palustre and his wife Marie Daguin in Saivres, where his father was then based. He studied at the Jesuit collège in Poitiers, where he gained his baccalaureat. He then travelled in Egypt and Italy (1866), giving him a taste for archaeology, though he only ever exercised it from his office. In 1862, he was made a member of the Société française d'archéologie pour la conservation des monuments.

Living solely off his investments, he settled in Touraine, where he became a corresponding member of the Société archéologique de Touraine on 31 March 1869 but it was only in 1870 that he really became interested in archaeology, publishing one article a month in the Bulletin monumental as studies of varied themes in Touraine's history. A polemicist, he opposed destroying historical buildings and was very critical of restorations as carried out by Viollet-le-Duc and his imitators.

On Auguste Pécard's death Palustre was made the museum's curator in July 1871, holding the post until 1874, when he resigned, as he wished to sell the museum to the town of Tours. In 1875 he became director of the Société française d'archéologie after Arcisse de Caumont's resignation on health grounds in 1872. Palustre kept the role until 1883 then became honorary director whilst still editing the Bulletin monumental. He served two terms as president of the Société archéologique de Touraine (1883–1889 and 1892–1894), spending the interim as its honorary president (1889–1892).

He is also notable for the many archaeological events he put on, such as the congresses he took part in (1875–1877) then organised (from 1878 onwards) in Toulouse (1875), Châlons-sur-Marne (1876), Autun (1876), Senlis (1877), Le Mans (1878), Arras (1880), Vienne (1881) and Caen (1883). Palustre also took part in several exhibitions and publishing catalogues of them. He proved one of the pioneers in using photography for art. and photographed several now-lost monuments such as the église Saint-Clément de Tours, which he photographed in detail just before its destruction in 1883. He died in 1894 in the Saint-Symphorien district of Tours. ·

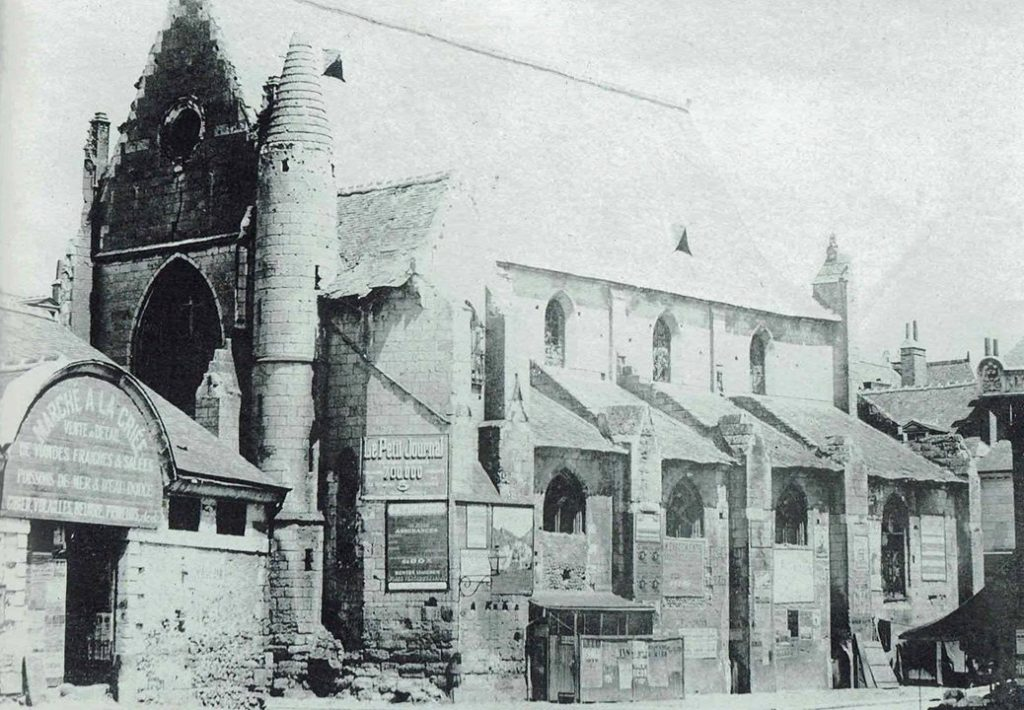
The église Saint-Clément de Tours before its destruction

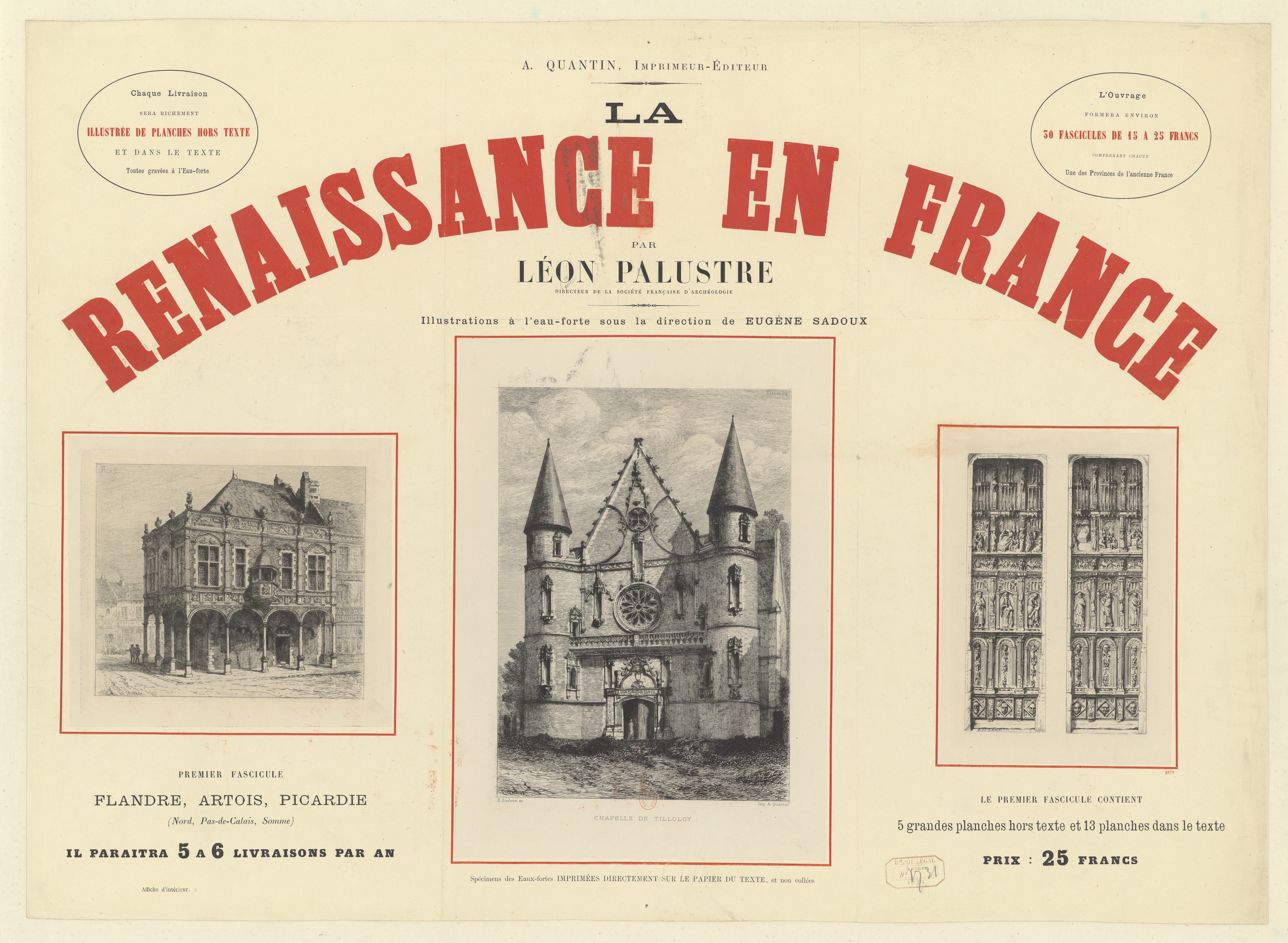
La Renaissance en France

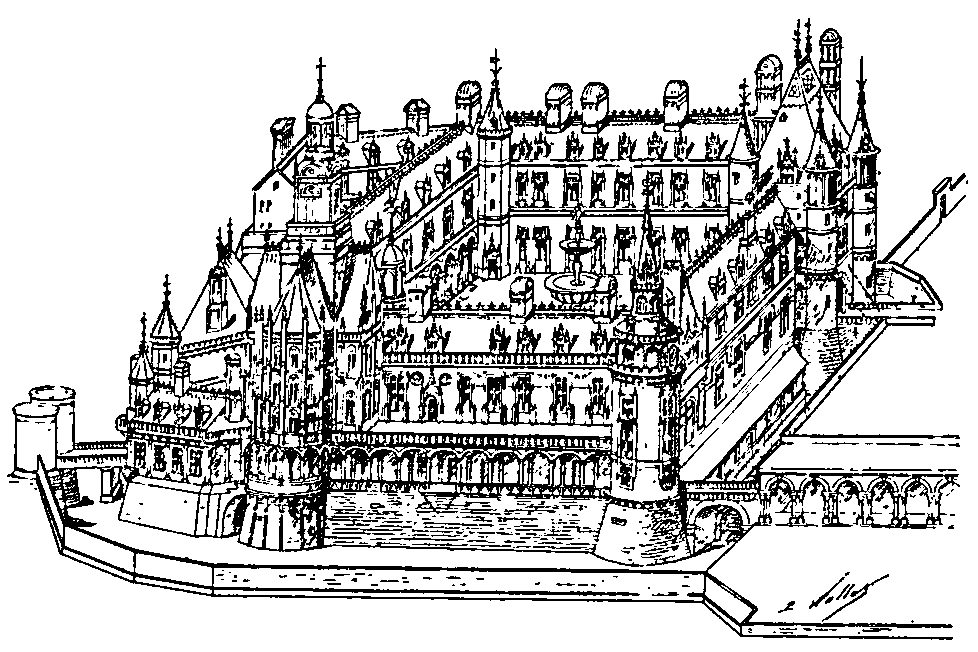
Figure 36 : the château de Gaillon

== Honours ==
- prix Marcelin Guérin from the Académie française in 1889 for his book La Renaissance en France.
- Knight of the Légion d'honneur, announced on 8 April 1893 and presented on 17 April the same year

== Publications ==
- L'architecture de la Renaissance - Dessins et gravures sous la direction de Eugène Sadoux. Vol. 1 (Flandre, Artois, Picardie, Île-de-France). Paris: A. Quantin - imprimeur-éditeur. 1879.
- L'architecture de la Renaissance - Dessins et gravures sous la direction de Eugène Sadoux. Vol. 2 (Île-de-France, Normandie). Paris: A. Quantin - imprimeur-éditeur. 1881.
- La Renaissance en France. Paris: Ancienne maison Quantin. 1888.,
- L'architecture de la Renaissance. Bibliothèque de l'enseignement des Beaux-Arts publiée sous la direction de M. Jules Comte. Paris: Ancienne maison Quantin - Librairies-imprimeries réunies. 1892.

=== Bulletin monumental ===
- Étude sur l'église Saint-Symphorien de Tours, 1873, 5e série, tome 1, p. 48–74

== Bibliography (in French) ==
- Jacques-Xavier Carré de Busserolle, Léon Palustre in Dictionnaire géographique, historique et biographique d'Indre-et-Loire et de l'ancienne province de Tourraine, Tours, Péricat, 1883, vol. 2
- Henri Faye,Éloge de Léon Pallustre in Bulletin de la Société archéologique de Touraine, T. X, Tours, 1895, p. 13-34
- Alphonse Farault, « Léon Palustre », dans Bibliographies du département des Deux-Sèvres, Imprimerie poitevine, Niort, 1931, vol. 1, p. 1-13 (lire en ligne)
- F. Desmoutiers, Historique de la Société française d'archéologie, vol. 3, Paris, 1934, p. 31-36
- Michel Laurencin, Dictionnaire biographique de Touraine, Chambray-les-Tours, CLD, 1990, p. 453-454
- Éliane Dumotier-Sigwalt, Surprises archéologiques du XIXe siècle à travers les bulletins de la Société archéologique de Touraine, in Bulletin de la Société archéologique de Touraine, t. I, Tours, 2004, p. 249-257
- Éliane Dumotier-Sigwalt, Sociétés savantes et voyages archéologiques dans la deuxième moitié du XIXe siècle : l’exemple de Léon Palustre, successeur d’Arcisse de Caumont à la Société française d’archéologie et président de la Société archéologique de Touraine, 130e Congrès national des sociétés historiques et scientifiques, La Rochelle, 2005
- Notice de Yves Pauwels dans le Dictionnaire critique de historiens de l'art sur le site de l'INHA
- Éliane Dumotier-Sigwalt, Voyages archéologiques et sociétés savantes dans la deuxième moitié du XIXe siècle : l’exemple de Léon Palustre in Christiane Demeulenaere-Douyère (dir), Explorations et voyages scientifiques de l'Antiquité à nos jours, CTHS, 2008, p. 293-316
- Hadhami Ben Jemaa, L'invention de l'architecture de la Renaissance française au 19th century: le regard de Léon Palustre, Thèse de doctorat : histoire de l'art, Tours: CESR/Université François-Rabelais, 2013, 2 vol.

== External links (in French) ==
- Notice on inha
- Ministère de la culture
