= Saint-Clément Church, Tours =

Church in Indre-et-Loire, France

Coordinates: 47.3924°N 0.6805°E

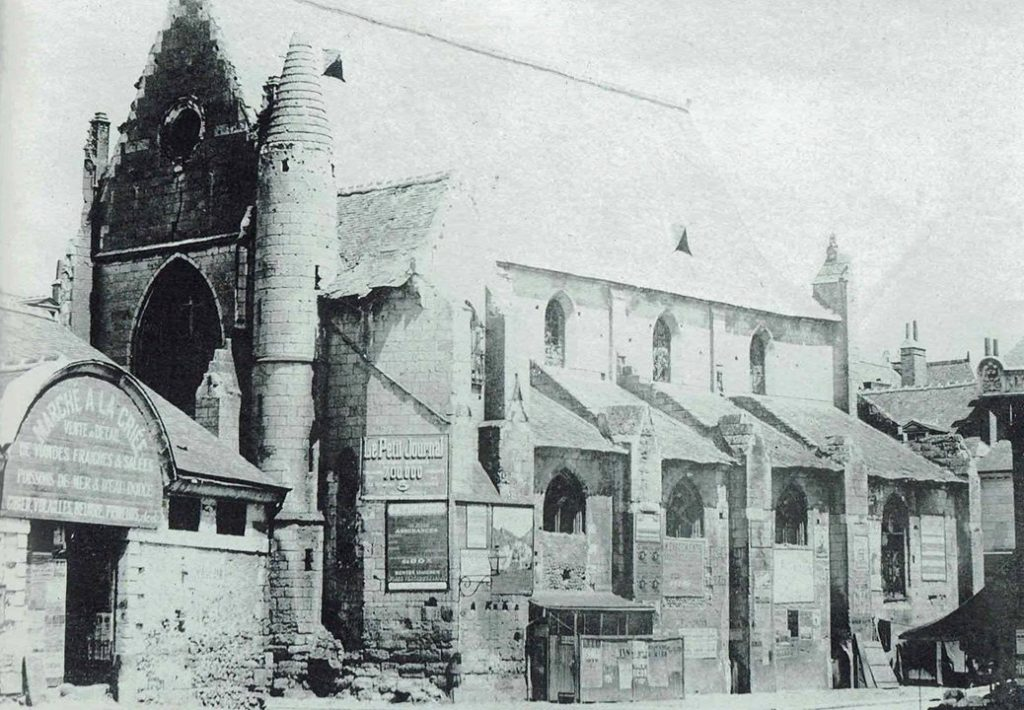

The church and the basilica before 1789 on a modern map.

Saint-Clément Church (église Saint-Clément de Tours) was a parish church in the old town of Tours, France, not far from the Basilica of Saint Martin. It was located on what is now the northern part of place Gaston-Paillhou, with its north wall aligned with the façades along the south side of rue des Halles.

It was built from 1462 to replace an earlier chapel promoted to a parish church. The French Revolutionaries stopped religious services there and in 1792 it was sold to the city as a grain market. It was demolished in 1883 as it had fallen into such a poor state that restoring it would be too expensive.

== History ==
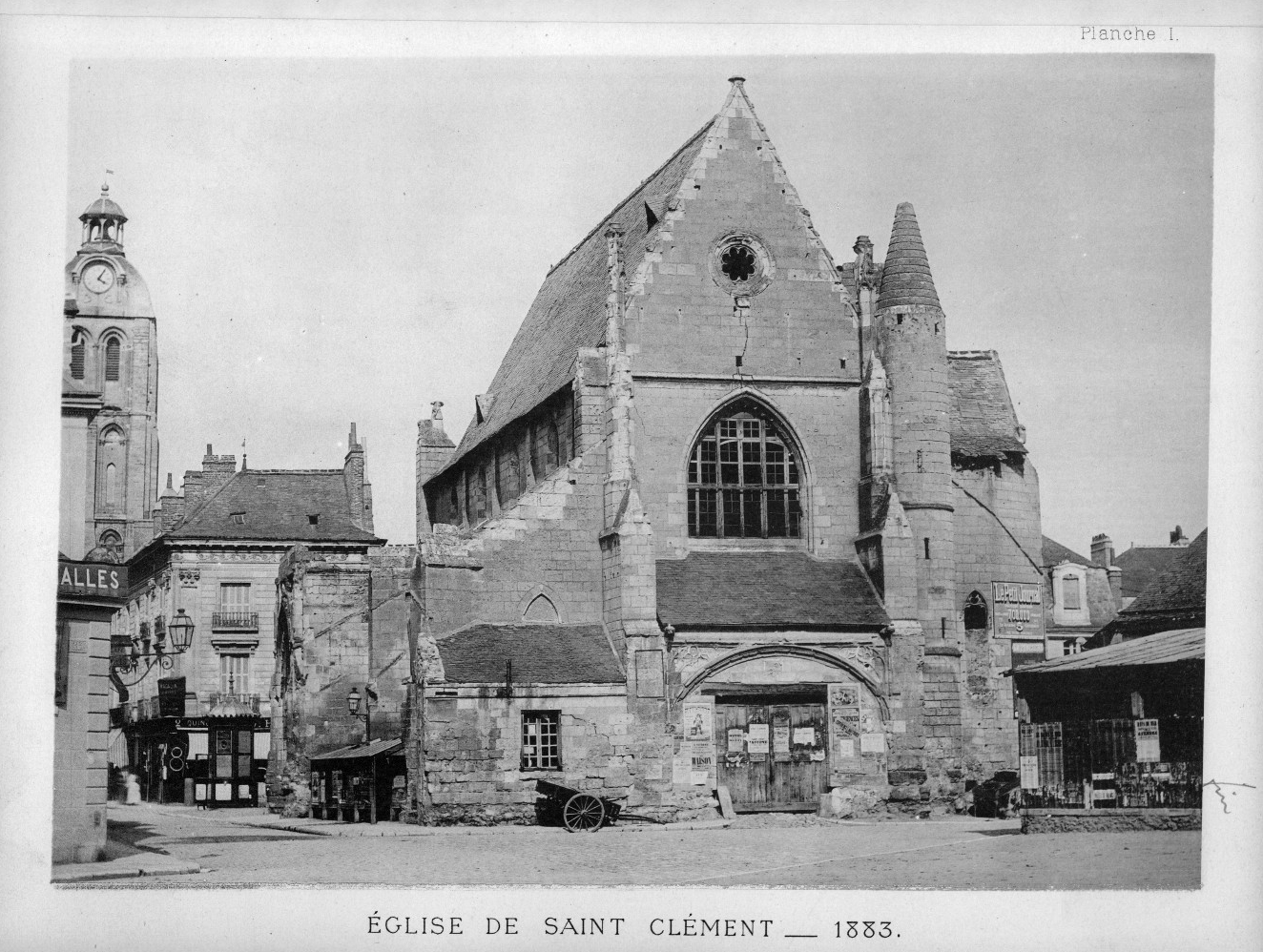
The church in 1883, just before its demolition.

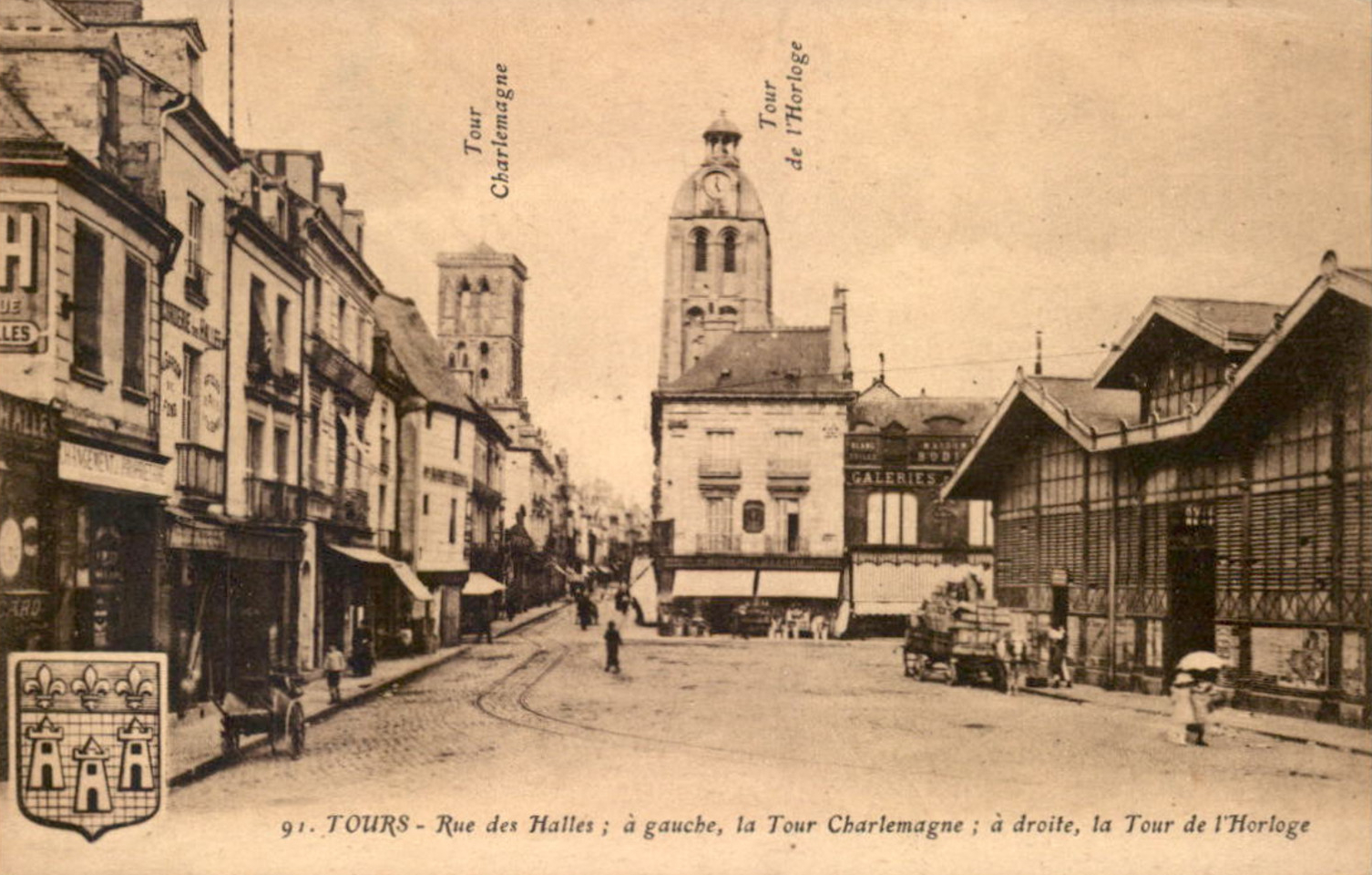
The city's old 'halles' (right), with the church in the centre background.

From the 9th century onwards there was a hospice for pilgrims and sick nobles to the west of St Martin's Basilica, whose chapel was dedicated to Clement of Rome. The hospice stopped its activities in 1184 and its chapel was converted into a parish church with the same dedication and mentioned in a papal bull of pope Lucius III. Although the initial chapel was not within the 10th century Châteauneuf Enclosure, it and the church which replaced it were both protected by the city's 14th century medieval wall, which was so close that a chamfered corner had to be built into the southwest corner of the church.

It was rebuilt in Flamboyant Gothic style from 1462 onwards on the initiative of the city's first mayor, Jean Briçonnet A gallery over the west entrance dates to the 16th century. To the south was a parish cemetery - excavations in 1975 found about a hundred burials.

In the 18th century Bernardin de Rosset de Fleury and Joachim François Mamert de Conzié, archbishops of Tours reorganised the city's parishes, but Saint-Clément was still in a good state and so its parish was expanded not suppressed and the church remained in use.

It was closed for religious use after the French Revolution and in 1792 it was sold to the city council, which - as it was close to the existing grain market - wished to use it as a covered grain market and so demolished its clock tower. However, the city council never paid the state for the building and the latter decided to stop chasing them for the payment in 1822. The building was not maintained and in the 1830s it proved too small for its new purpose.

Its condition worsened and early in the 1880s it proved an obstacle to building the city's present covered markets or 'halles'. The council decided it was impossible to restore the former church and so it was demolished in 1883. Some of its furnishings and decorations were given to the Société archéologique de Touraine, which had initially been worried by the demolition. - for a time it considered a project to reassemble the church's north porch in the Jardin des Prébendes d'Oé, but this did not come to fruition.

== Architecture ==
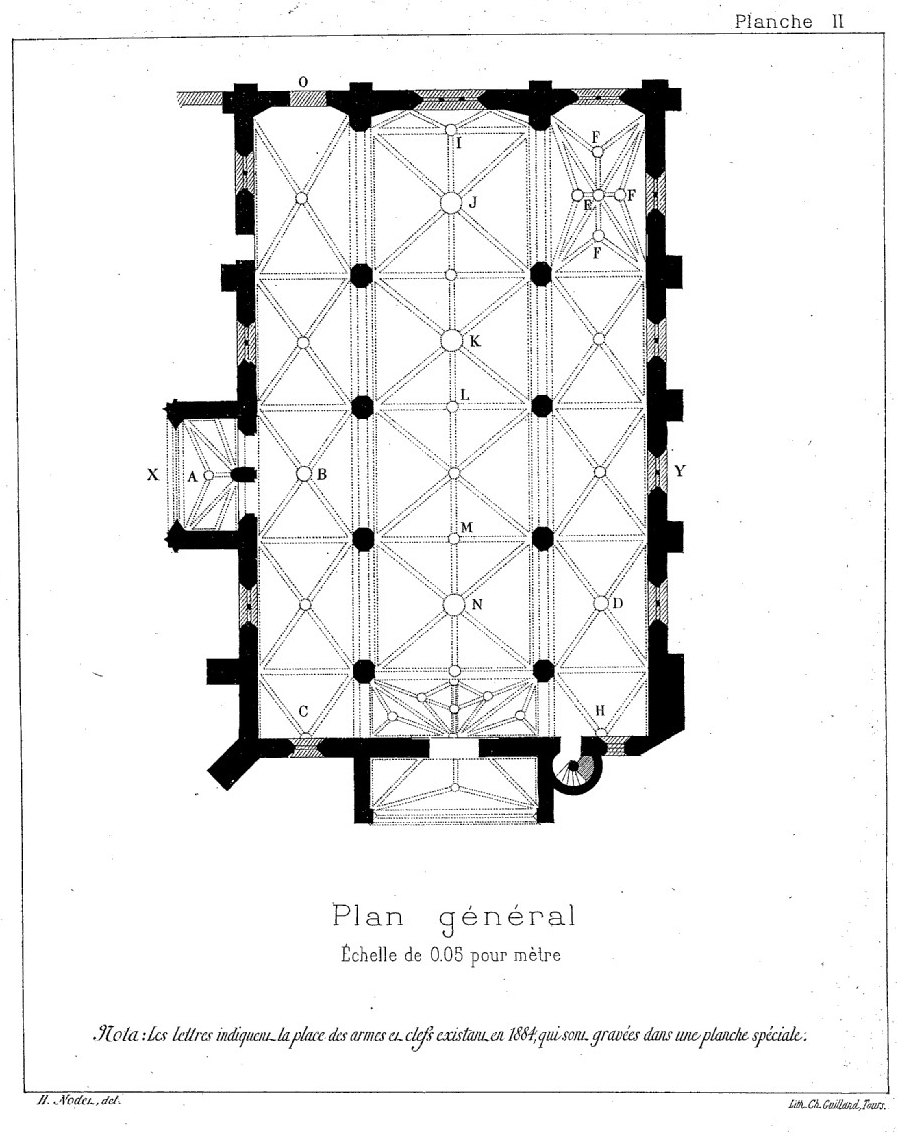
Plan, with north at left.

It consisted of a porch then a three-bay nave, extended by a choir bay without an intervening transept and ending in a flat chancel. Its development towards the east was limited by a ditch for the city wall. The nave and choir are flanked by an aisle. The aisles, shorter than the central aisle of the nave, were given four-part vaults, whilst the nave had six-ribbed vaults.

The west door in the porch was little-used due to its proximity to the city wall, with the main entrance being via a north porch in the second bay of the nave. To the right of the west door a spiral staircase turret provided access to the attic. The walls were supported by buttresses, except for the southwest corner. A bell tower stood above the first bay of the nave, consisting of a timber and iron frame covered in lead.

The overall dimensions of the building were 27.6 by 18,1 metres, with a height of 21.7 m at the level of the roof ridge.

== Bibliography (in French) ==
- Bernard Chevalier (May 1985). Histoire de Tours (in French). Toulouse: Privat. ISBN 2-7089-8224-9.
- Galinié, Henri (2007). Tours antique et médiéval. Lieux de vie, temps de la ville. 40 ans d'archéologie urbaine (in French). Tours: FERACF. ISBN 978-2-913272-15-6..
- Palustre, Léon; Lhuillier, Léon (1887). Monographie de l'église Saint-Clément de Tours - Mémoire de la Société archéologique de Touraine. Vol. II. Henri Nodet..
- Marie-Thérèse Réau (1986). "Ancienne église paroissiale Saint-Clément ; dossier de préinventaire normalisé". Inventaire général du patrimoine.
