= Eugène Sadoux =

Jean Eugène Sadoux (13 March 1841 – November 1906) was a French painter, lithographer and etcher.

== Life ==
Born in Angoulême, he studied under Edward Harrison May and assisted him in the painted decoration of his birthplace's town hall. He also studied drawing and engraving in Paris, creating illustrations for Le Magasin pittoresque, Le Monde illustré and l'Illustration.

In 1871 he produced watercolours of the Commandery in Cressac-Saint-Genis, thus preserving details of that painting which have since been lost. The Matin Charentais of 11 May 1895 contained a short biography of him, whilst Le Charentais of 4 4 May 1889 describes an exhibition of twelve of his engravings. He died in Tunis.

== Bibliography ==
- La Renaissance en France [Texte imprimé] / par Léon Palustre; dessins et gravures sous la direction d'Eugène Sadoux. Paris: Quantin, 1879–1881. vol. 1–3 (in French)
- La Franche-Comté by Henri Bouchot – Paris: Plon, 1890 (in French)

== Works by him in the Musée d'Angoulême ==
=== Engravings ===
- « Théâtre des Bouchauds » : views of the excavations and details of the finds (series of black and white lithographs, about 21 × 25 cm, except plate II, a panoramic view of the site, which is 22 cm × 65 cm);
- « The Town Hall in Angoulême » : 29-5-1868 ? (lithograph after a drawing by Sadoux, 57 cm × 45 cm);.
- « The New Town Hall in Angoulême » : 1868 (woodcut, 20,5 cm × 26,7 cm);.
- « The Saint-Simon's House in Angoulême » : 1870 (etching, 23,3 cm × 17 cm);.
- « Château de la Rochefoucauld »:
  - general view : c. 1879-1880 (etching, 14 cm × 18 cm environ, for the publisher Eudes, Paris);
  - courtyard and façade : 1880 (etching, about 23 cm × 29 cm, for éditeur Quantin);
  - courtyard, staircase and south façade : c. 1880 (eaux-fortes, about 18 cm × 25 cm);
- « Château d'Oyron (Oiron) : façade of the Renaissance Gallery and the main staircase », etchings without text linked to others in an anonymous album from the late 19th century showing views of the château (private collection);

=== Watercolour on paper ===
- Frescoes in the Temple at Cressac, September 1871 (varied dimensions, formerly on a large canvas frame of 88 cm × 178 cm; restored and remounted into seven marie-louises in 1996);
- Interior of the Temple at Cressac, 1872 (23,5 cm × 30,5 cm);
- Saint-Amant-de-Boixe, May 1872 (27 cm × 40 cm);
- Frescoes in the crypt of Saint-Amant-de-Boixe, June 1872 (88 cm × 118,5 cm);
- Edges of the Touvre gorge, April 1872 (36,5 cm × 49 cm).
