= Châteauneuf Enclosure =

French fortification

Châteauneuf enclosure
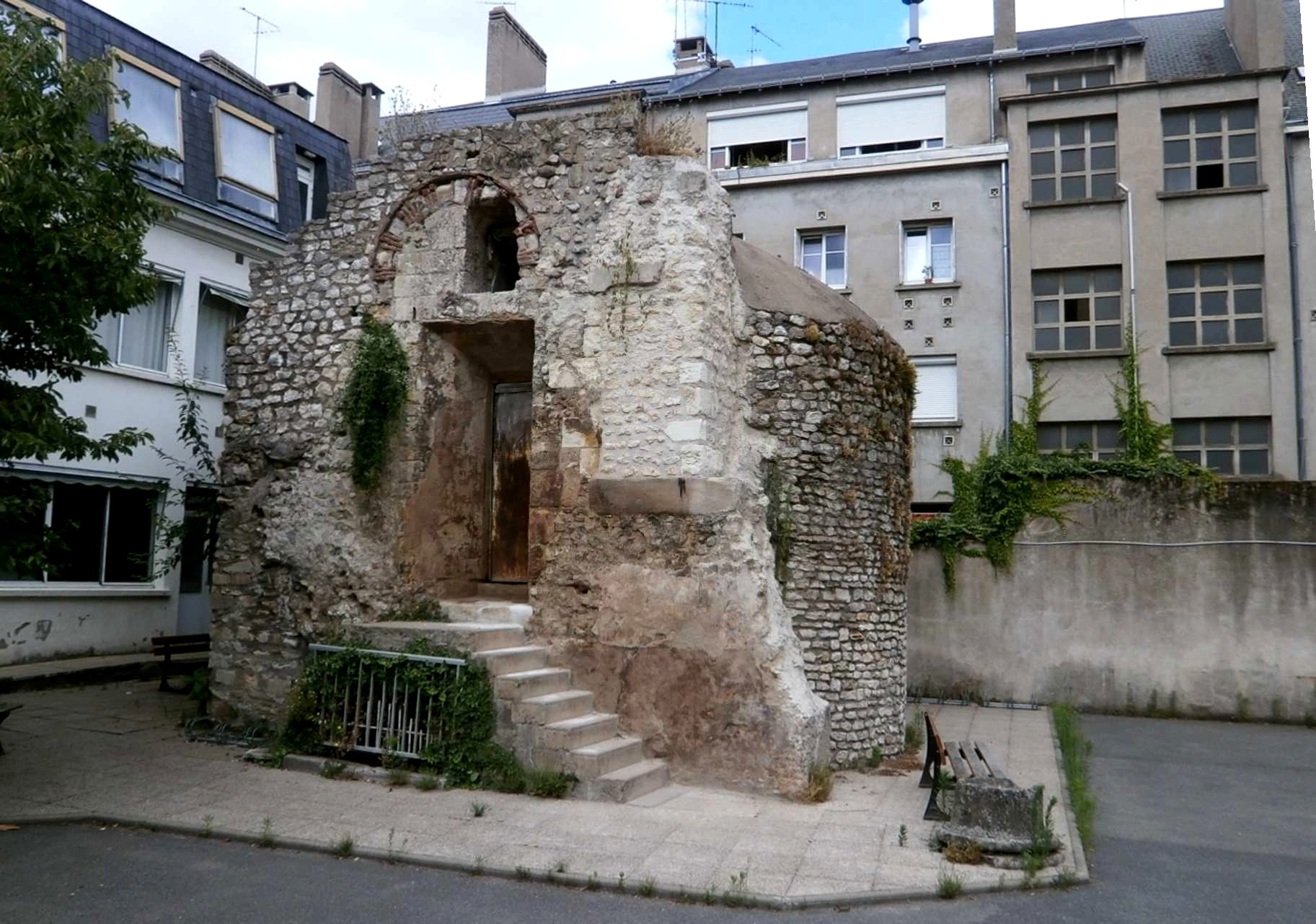
- Tour of the enclosure (Rue Baleschoux).
- Interactive map of Châteauneuf enclosure
- Location: Tours; Touraine; Indre-et-Loire; France
- Coordinates: 47°23′35″N 0°41′02″E
- Type: Fortification
- Beginning date: 10th century
- Listed as a historic monument (1940, 1941, 1950)

The Châteauneuf enclosure, also known as the "Martinopole enclosure," is a fortification wall that surrounded the settlement of Châteauneuf-de-Saint-Martin, now integrated into the modern city of Tours, located in the Indre-et-Loire department in the Centre-Val de Loire region of France.

The enclosure was likely constructed in the early 10th century to provide physical protection for the Basilica of Saint Martin and to assert the political presence of the settlement that developed around the sanctuary, in opposition to the nearby Gallo-Roman city. Surrounded by a defensive ditch and equipped with gates and towers, the enclosure became obsolete with the construction of a newer wall encompassing a larger area. It was gradually dismantled, with its materials repurposed. The last significant above-ground remains were destroyed during World War II and postwar reconstruction. Two restored towers remain visible to the east and southwest, and additional remnants survive underground.

The enclosed town comprised two distinct communities. The southern sector was occupied by the canons of the collegiate church of Saint Martin, forming the canonical quarter, while the northern sector was inhabited by lay residents. No physical barrier appears to have separated the two groups, which coexisted along a shared street.

The Châteauneuf enclosure has been listed as a historic monument in the national register since the period between 1940 and 1950, with the designation dates varying by section.

== Historical and political context ==
=== A city in early bipolarity ===
Tours in the 10th century. (Note: The geographical boundaries of the urbanized area of Châteauneuf and its suburbium are imprecise by several dozen meters. (Note: Noizet 2007, p. 106: Le castellum sancti Martini (903-938)))

At the beginning of the 10th century, the city of Tours, as it is recognized today, did not exist as a unified urban entity. Instead, two distinct centers, separated by over a kilometer, coexisted with their own identities:

To the east was the Cité of Tours, a successor to the Roman city of Caesarodunum. Enclosed by 4th-century castrum walls, it hosted both comital (administrative) and episcopal (religious) authorities but lacked significant economic activity. (Note: Galinié 2007, p. 364)

To the west, a settlement developed around the tomb of Saint Martin, gradually expanding due to the growth of pilgrimage activity and the accumulation of land donations. The sanctuary's royal protection enhanced its prestige. (Note: Galinié 2007, p. 367) Originating from the 5th-century basilica constructed over the saint’s tomb and elevated to a collegiate church shortly after the Fifth Council of Aachen in 817, the town expanded northward, forming a suburbium and likely establishing a landing stage on the left bank of the Loire. At this stage, the area lacked a defensive enclosure. (Note: Galinié 2007, p. 366)

Between the two urban centers, development was limited, with the exception of the declining monastery of Saint-Julien, which was later revitalized by Archbishop Teotolon. (Note: Galinié 2007, pp. 383–384)

=== A defensive structure with symbolic purpose ===
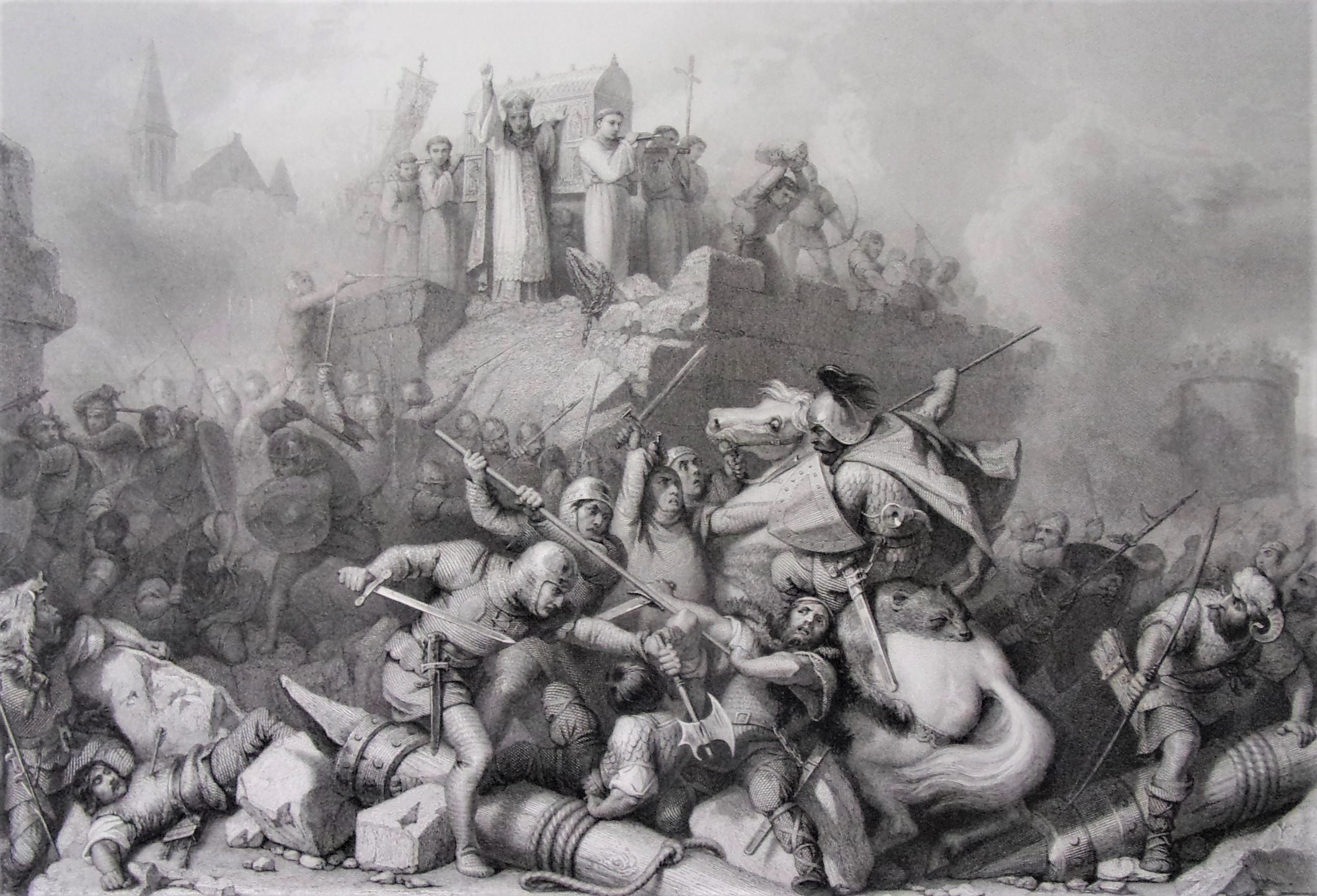
The Normans were put to flight beneath the walls of the city of Tours in 903 by the presentation of the reliquary of Saint Martin.

The wealth and prominence of the town surrounding the Basilica of Saint Martin—encompassing both its merchant population and the chapter of the Collegiate Church of Saint Martin of Tours—provoked significant interest and envy. Between November 8, 853, and June 30, 903, the area experienced multiple Norman incursions, resulting in pillaging and fires. These events led to the temporary relocation of Saint Martin’s relics to several sites, including the Abbey of Saint-Paul de Cormery, the Collegiate Church of Léré, the Martinian villa in Chablis, and eventually the Cité of Tours. While contemporary chronicles tend to exaggerate the scale of these attacks, (Note: The body of Martin, sheltered in the Cité de Tours since 877, definitively returned to the basilica in 918, once the fortification works of Châteauneuf were completed; the canons, who had left at the same time as the relics, also returned.) they nonetheless contributed to a climate of insecurity. In response, the canons, merchants, and bourgeois of the town financed the construction of a defensive enclosure around the Basilica of Saint Martin. Although protection was the officially stated purpose, the initiative also appears to have served broader political and religious objectives. (Note: Noizet 2007, pp. 99–100: Le castellum sancti Martini (903-938))

The construction of the enclosure was part of a broader contest for influence among local authorities. It sought to assert the identity of the new Martinian town in contrast to the older urban center, amid often difficult relations between the basilica chapter and the count, and especially the bishop. This tension became more pronounced from the late 10th century onward. (Note: Noizet 2007, p. 197: La Martinopole) The architectural choice to emulate the ancient castrum—still prominent in the 10th century—suggests that Châteauneuf aimed to position itself as equal to the older city. The enclosure formalized the city's bipolar structure at the close of the early Middle Ages, particularly as episcopal influence extended both east and west of Châteauneuf, placing it between the possessions and spheres of influence of its rival. By encompassing both religious and secular areas, the enclosure also reinforced the mixed and enduring character of the settlement.

== A construction with uncertain chronology ==
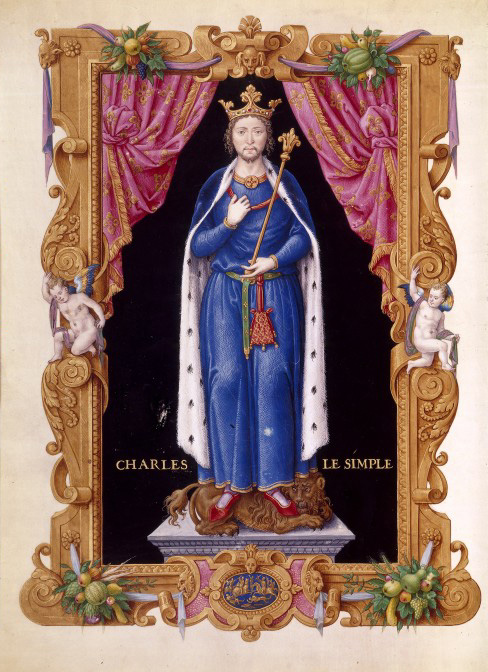
Charles the Simple (Recueil des rois de France by Jean du Tillet (BNF), c. 1550).

Until the mid-2000s, most historians, following the interpretation proposed by Charles Lelong in 1970, held that the fortification of Châteauneuf occurred in two distinct phases. According to this view, an initial enclosure composed of a wooden palisade and an external ditch was constructed in the early 10th century. This structure was subsequently replaced by a masonry fortification at the end of the 10th century or the beginning of the 11th century, generally following the same layout. This hypothesis was supported by the term castrum nuovum sancti Martini, in which the adjective nuovum was understood to signify that a "new" enclosure had superseded an earlier one.

Since 2007, a re-examination of written sources and a reinterpretation of field data have led to a reassessment of the previously accepted chronology. The existence of an initial enclosure made of perishable materials, for which no archaeological evidence has been found, is now considered uncertain. Current interpretations suggest that the fortification of Châteauneuf may have been constructed in a single phase, directly in stone, between 903 and 918. This construction would have followed authorization granted by King Charles the Simple in a charter issued at the joint request of Robert (Count of Tours, son of Robert the Strong and lay abbot of Saint-Martin from 888 to 902 (Note: Noizet 2007, pp. 100 & 105: Relations politiques et responsabilités au sein du chapitre de Saint-Martin (du IXe siècle à la fin du Xe siècle)) and the local townspeople. (Note: Livernet 1982, p. 160: Les remparts)

The term "Châteauneuf" appears to have been used in a pejorative sense by the monks of Marmoutier, likely to highlight the greater antiquity of their own Martinian foundation in contrast to this newer district. (Note: Galinié 2007, pp. 297–299) The designation castrum novum occurs earliest and most frequently in charters and documents originating from Marmoutier. In contrast, documents from the chapter of Saint-Martin do not use the term castrum; from the 10th century onward, they refer instead to claustrum or castellum Sancti Martini to more specifically denote the canonical enclosure. The term "Martinopole" is attested only briefly at the end of the 11th century, possibly influenced by Bérenger of Tours, who aimed—without success—to establish a major district under the spiritual authority of Saint Martin. (Note: Noizet 2007, pp. 193 & 205: Martinopolis)

=== General layout and design ===
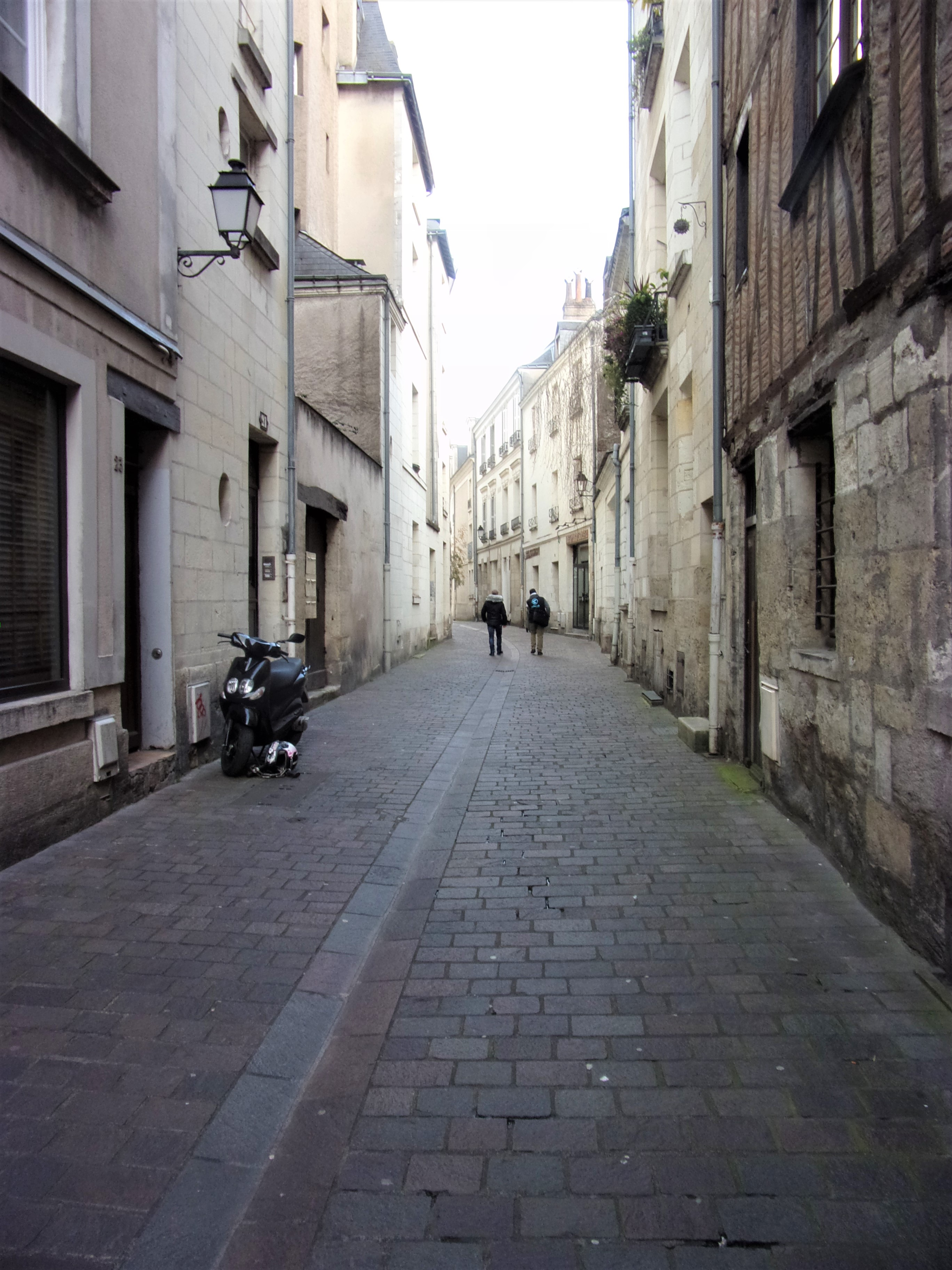
Rue du Petit Soleil.

Layout of the enclosure.

The outline of the Châteauneuf enclosure is approximately defined by the perimeter formed by Rue Néricault-Destouches to the south, Place Gaston-Paillhou and Place du Grand-Marché to the west, Rue de la Rôtisserie and Rue du Petit-Soleil to the north, and Rue du Président-Merville and Rue de Jérusalem to the east. These streets, already present in the Middle Ages, were initially thought to have served as service paths bordering the exterior of the ditch. (Note: Livernet 1982, p. 175: Les remparts) However, they possibly occupy the ditch’s original location. The wall’s layout appears to have been influenced by pre-existing spatial structures, such as roads and land plots, although this cannot be confirmed with certainty. A north-south route between the wall and the Loire, attested as early as the 7th or 8th century, may have been reorganized in the early 10th century by Archbishop Téotolon to improve access between the enclosure and the river. This route then divided into multiple branches upon exiting the northern boundary of the enclosure.

In 1888, Casimir Chevalier proposed the existence of an inner rampart within the Châteauneuf enclosure, closely surrounding the basilica to provide additional protection for the Martinian sanctuary. This hypothesis, likely based on a misinterpretation of archaeological evidence, is not supported by contemporary chronicles and is contradicted by accounts of the 1417 assault on Châteauneuf by John the Fearless, which confirm the absence of such a fortification.

The eastern section of the enclosure is relatively well documented, owing to archaeological investigations conducted after the destruction caused by World War II. (Note: Galinié 2007, p. 259) The northern face can be partially reconstructed from parcel boundaries visible in the Napoleonic cadastre. (Note: Livernet 1982, p. 353: Remparts et ponts : heurs et malheurs) The western flank had largely disappeared by the 18th century, and changes in the parcel layout before the cadastre make its precise tracing difficult. The southern section, once preserved and maintained, now survives only in fragmentary form, either through physical remnants or historical plans. However, these elements enable a partial reconstruction of its original extent. (Note: Livernet 1982, p. 161: Les remparts)

=== Architecture ===
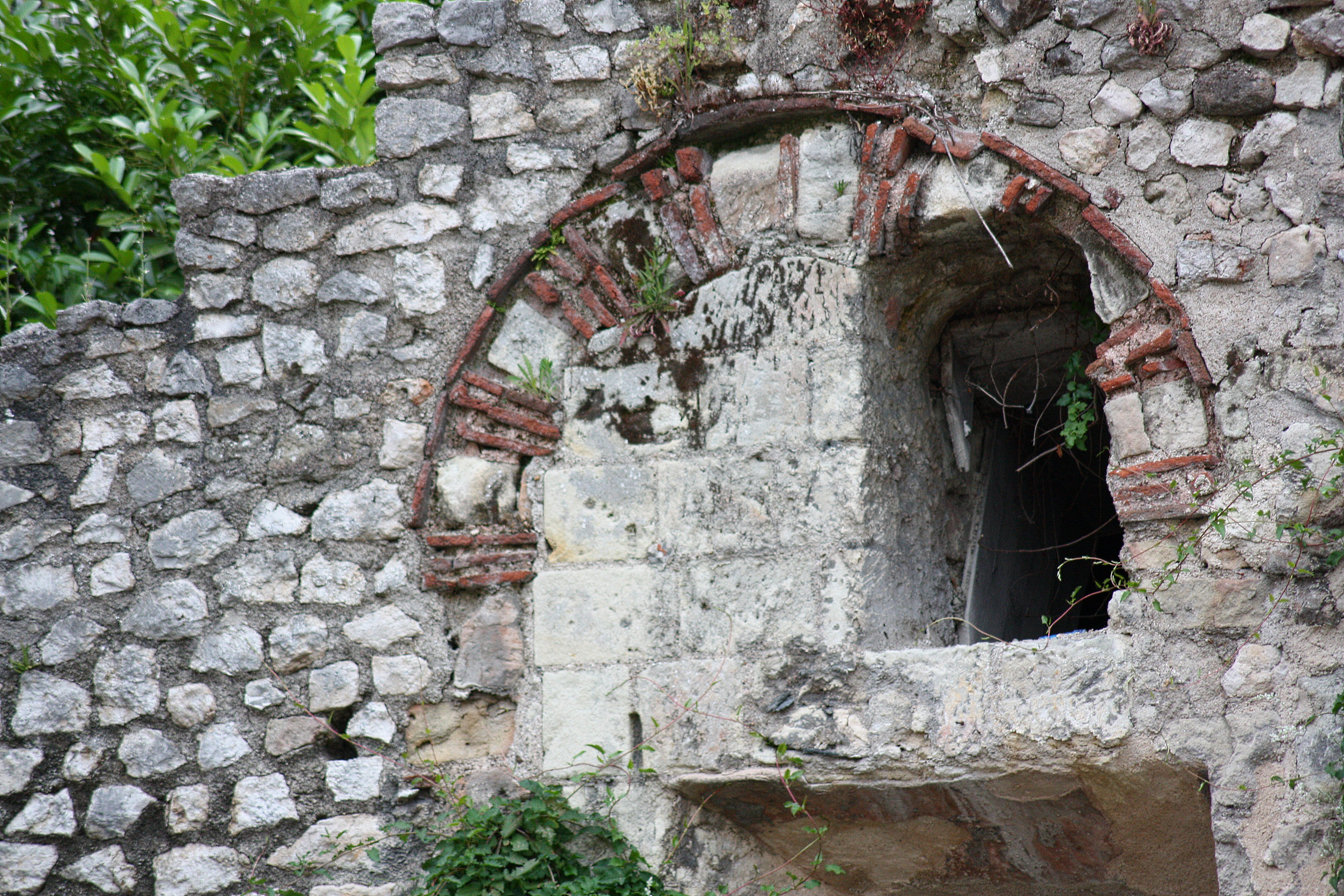
Detail of the arch of a bay window in the tower on Rue Baleschoux (10th century).

The general architecture of the Châteauneuf enclosure, characterized by its curtain walls and towers, appears to have been inspired by the Gallo-Roman enclosure of Tours, dating back to the 4th century. It features regularly spaced towers integrated into a high and thick curtain wall, using brick or terracotta in certain architectural elements, including the arches of some openings.

==== Curtain wall ====
The construction of the Châteauneuf enclosure features faced walls composed of small, irregular masonry, primarily flint bonded with pink mortar, and coated with a secondary layer of pink or reddish mortar. This coating, sometimes revealing the white tips of the rubble stones, may reflect an aesthetic consideration. The outer facings enclose a rubble fill core, with the wall measuring approximately 2.5 to 3 meters in width and potentially reaching a height of 10 to 11 meters above the medieval ground level. The foundations, though difficult to access, appear to be made of large stone blocks. An excavation in 1889 indicated that the ground level had risen by approximately 6 meters between the 10th and late 19th centuries. The presence of a wall walk remains uncertain, although in 1941, Henry Auvray referenced “a stone staircase [that] is almost certainly the one that provided access to the walls.”

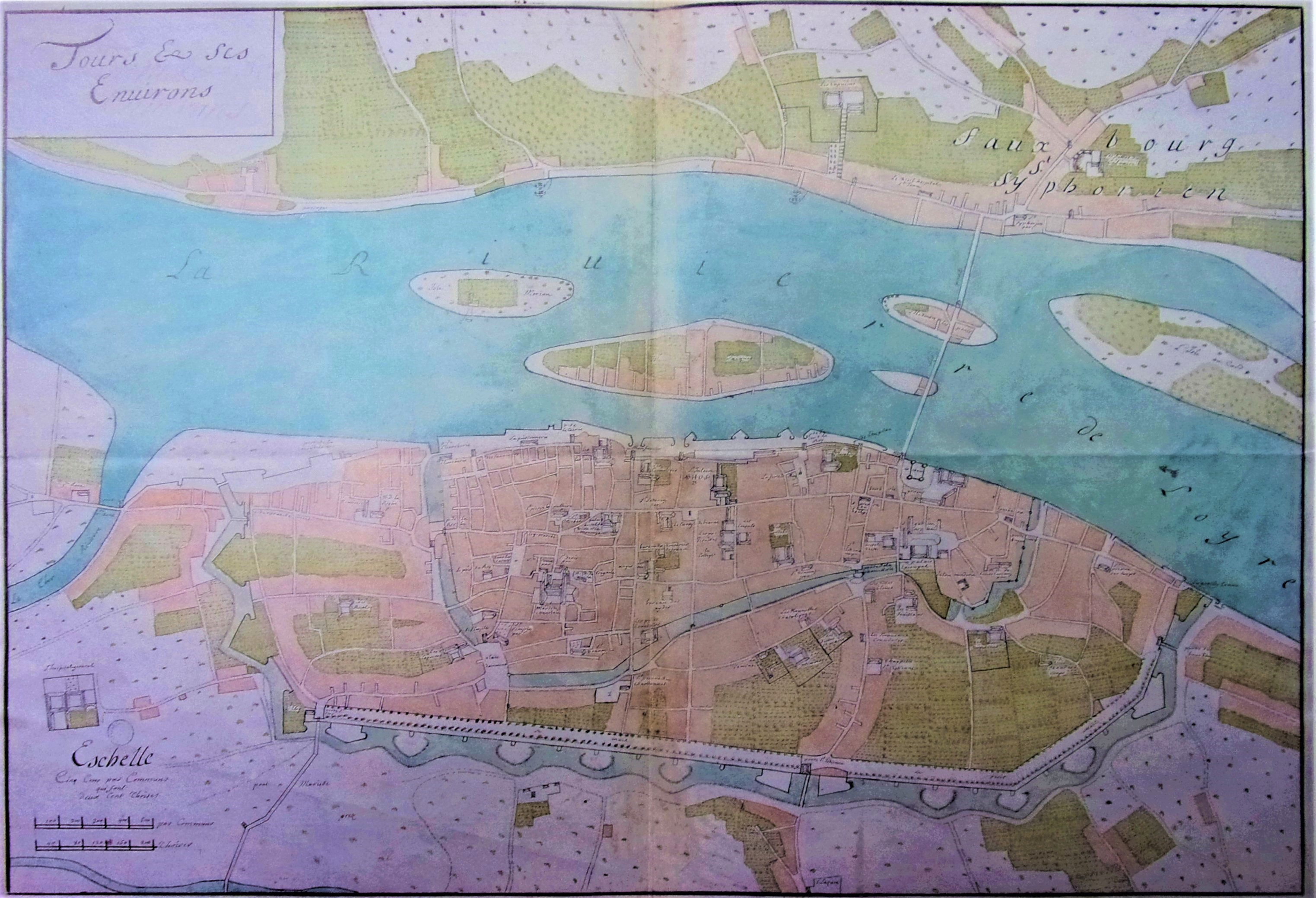
Map of Tours around 1670.

By the mid-11th century, the northern section of the Châteauneuf curtain wall appears to have been neglected, while the southern portion, corresponding to the canonical enclosure, continued to be maintained. (Note: Galinié 2007, p. 389) From the 12th century onward, segments of the wall were repurposed as foundations for houses built along its outer face, primarily by lay residents, but also by clergy. During this period, the defensive function of the enclosure progressively declined. (Note: Galinié 2007, p. 411) In the 14th century, parts of the wall were dismantled and used as a quarry for building the clouaison constructed under John the Good, (Note: By letters patent dated March 1356, King John II the Good authorized the inhabitants of Tours to build a new enclosure intended to unite the various urban centers that would form the late medieval city. (Note: Galinié 2007, p. 301)) which rendered the Châteauneuf enclosure obsolete as it was incorporated within the new fortification. Surviving sections of the wall were either demolished when they impeded new construction or reused as structural elements within buildings.

A map of Tours dating from around 1670, attributed to Tonon de Rochefou, shows the approximate outline of the former enclosure based on the alignment of interior streets, although the curtain wall itself is no longer depicted. (Note: Galinié 2007, pp. 131–314)

==== Gates ====
Four gates, aligned with the cardinal points, have been identified in the Châteauneuf enclosure: the Écrignole (or Escrignolle) Gate to the east, the Saint-Venant (or Cloister) Gate to the south, the Treasury (or Saint-Martin) Gate to the west, and the Petrucian Gate (later known as the Saint-Denis Gate) to the north. Excavations in 1895 near the southern gate revealed a major road, likely extending from this gate and crossing the alluvial plain to the southwest.

As the city expanded beyond the enclosure’s limits, the gates became obstacles to urban circulation and were progressively dismantled. The demolition date of the Écrignole Gate is recorded as 1660. The remaining gates were removed between 1812 and 1838, likely in connection with the urban redevelopment following the demolition of the former Saint-Martin Basilica (1797–1803). (Note: Livernet 1982, p. 345: Remparts et ponts : heurs et malheurs)

==== Towers ====
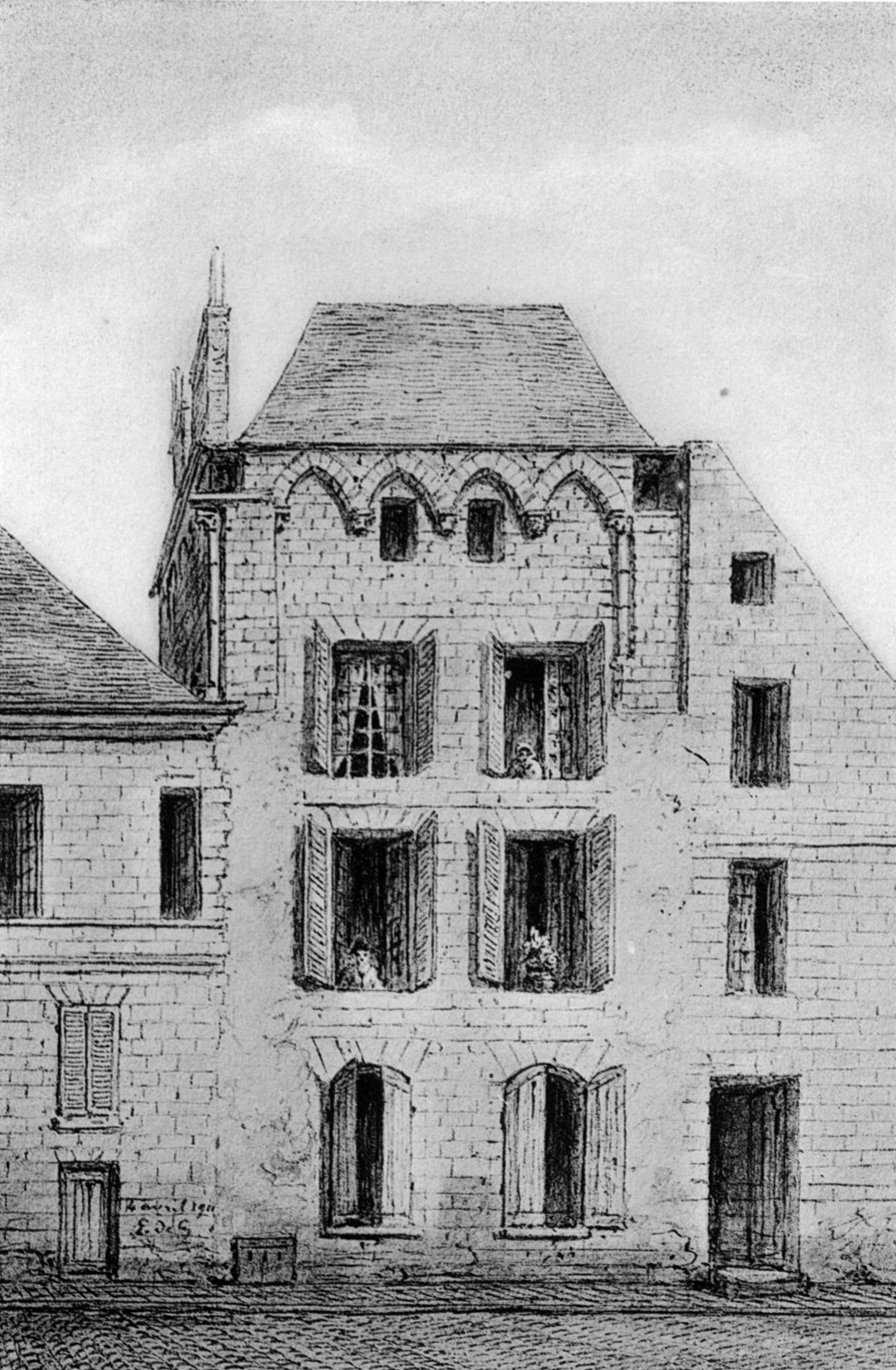
Foubert Tower.

The enclosure was reinforced with towers spaced approximately 40 meters apart along the curtain wall. Based on the documented configuration of the eastern flank, the overall layout likely included four corner towers, eight gate flanking towers (two per gate), and nine intermediate towers. These towers were cylindrical, with internal diameters ranging from 4 to 5 meters and external diameters from 7 to 10 meters. They were divided into levels by wooden platforms and partially embedded in the curtain wall. The lower levels were windowless and accessible only from above, likely by ladders. Many towers were partially rebuilt and vaulted in later periods. The earliest of these vaults dates to the 12th century and reflects the Gothic style of western France. Restoration work continued into the 15th century, including a notable campaign around 1475, when architect Thierry Babillone (or Babylone) of Tours restored several towers and sections of the southern portion of the curtain wall in the canonical sector of the enclosure.

Two towers within the Châteauneuf enclosure appear to have served specific functions. The Saint-Barbe or Picardie Tower, located at the northwest corner, was used as an arsenal and was demolished in 1816 after falling into ruin. The Babylone Tower, (Note: The Babylone Tower owes its name to the architect Thierry Babylone. Nevertheless, confusion with the Mesopotamian city persists due to the proximity of this tower to Rue de Jérusalem.) situated along the southern section of the eastern wall, housed the Châteauneuf prisons (Note: As early as the second half of the 11th century, the chapter of Saint-Martin held three fiefs, including the fief of the "Justice du Cloître," under the responsibility of the chapter's treasurer, (Note: Noizet 2007, pp. 168–172: Les roi et les seigneurs à Saint-Martin (950-110)) who, as the name indicates, possessed his judicial rights, granted by the king.) in the 15th century. The interior wall of its ground floor was coated with white plaster, decorated with painted faux joints resembling large ashlar blocks in brick red.

In addition to the main enclosure, the fortification system may have included advanced defensive structures added at a later date, such as the Foubert Tower (12th or 13th century) and the so-called “des Pucelles” Tower (constructed before the 15th century and located further north). However, the existence of a coherent defensive system incorporating these elements remains unconfirmed and is debated among historians. These structures may also have been tower-houses, which were common in the area and did not necessarily serve a military function. (Note: Galinié 2007, pp. 271–273)

==== Ditch ====
The curtain wall was originally bordered by a water-filled ditch, which followed the approximate alignment of medieval and later streets encircling the enclosure from the northwest to the southwest via the east. Archaeological excavations conducted in 1989 at the northeastern corner of the enclosure revealed a V-shaped ditch, measuring approximately 5 meters wide at the top and 3 meters deep. This ditch was used for waste disposal and functioned as both a sewer and a refuse site. Beginning in the 12th century, houses were constructed between the former ditch and the curtain wall, indicating that the ditch had already been filled in by that time. The infilling process may have begun earlier, possibly in the late 10th or early 11th century.

== A shared living space ==
=== Religious South, lay North: A theoretical bipartition ===
Organization of space within the enclosure at the time of construction.

Occupying a quadrilateral measuring between 210 and 250 meters per side and covering approximately four hectares, the Châteauneuf of Saint-Martin was divided into two distinct areas on either side of the basilica and the east-west thoroughfare: the lay and commercial quarter to the north, and the canonical quarter to the south. The enclosed area excluded several monastic establishments located further south but encompassed the entire commercially active northern sector. The fortification appears to have been designed to protect an area not yet densely developed but intended for future expansion. The internal spatial layout is not precisely documented. However, two main perpendicular streets (Rue des Halles and the axis formed by Rues Descartes and du Change) intersect near the center of the enclosure. A peripheral road likely followed the interior of the wall, a pattern partly preserved today through several streets, including Rue Baleschoux, Rue du Panier Fleuri, Rue de l’Arbalète, Rue Henri-Royer, Rue Julien-Leroy, and Rue Rapin.

The presence of three parish churches within the lay sector, at least two of which predate the construction of the enclosure, (Note: Gregory of Tours founded the Church of Sainte-Croix in the 6th century, and the Church of Notre-Dame de l'Écrignole may date from the same period, although it was later rebuilt, established as a parish church before 1150, (Note: Noizet 2007, p. 184: Le castellum sancti Martini (903-938)) and then destroyed in 1782.) supports the interpretation of a spatial division between lay and canonical areas. Two intra-mural cemeteries, each associated with one of these churches, appear to have existed during the medieval period. Within the canonical area south of the basilica, residences for canons were constructed. One of these, built in the 13th century and used for that purpose until the French Revolution, remains standing at No. 4 Rue Rapin and is partially listed as a historic monument. A royal residence may also have been located within this southern enclosure; while its existence is confirmed, its precise location has not been determined.

The theoretical division between the northern lay sector and the southern religious sector of the Châteauneuf enclosure was accompanied by regulations, including the prohibition of women from entering the canonical area. In practice, this rule was frequently disregarded, as the enclosure lacked a physical barrier despite being designated by the canons as a castellum or claustrum. Women from the lay quarter accessed resources such as a well located in the south and frequented a public inn established by the canons within the religious sector. (Note: Noizet 2007, p. 115: Le castellum sancti Martini (903-938)) Hospices in the canonical area also facilitated movement between the two sectors. Conversely, residences for canons were constructed in the northern lay area. This permeability, more readily accepted by the canons than by ecclesiastical authorities, was closely linked to the cult of Saint Martin and the steady flow of pilgrims passing through Châteauneuf. (Note: Noizet 2007, p. 108: Le castellum sancti Martini (903-938))

There is no precise record of the population within the Châteauneuf enclosure, particularly regarding the lay inhabitants. The presence of several parish churches does not provide a reliable estimate, as the associated parishes likely extended beyond the enclosure. (Note: Galinié 2007, pp. 390–391) Historical records indicate that the number of canons was approximately 200 in 848 and 150 in 1180, with an additional 56 vicars. Estimates suggest a total population of between 1,500 and 2,500 individuals, including both canons and lay residents.

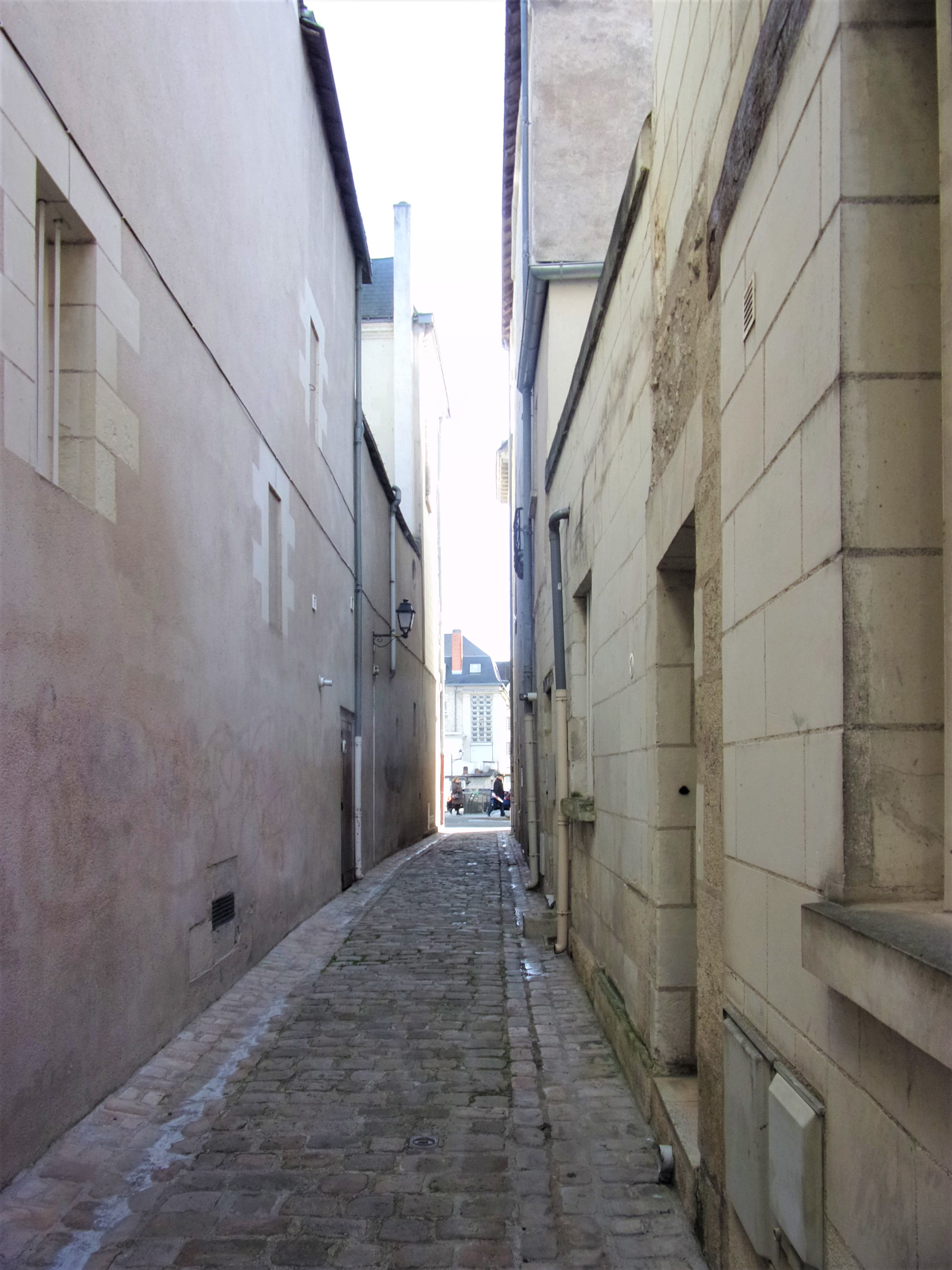
Flower-covered street.

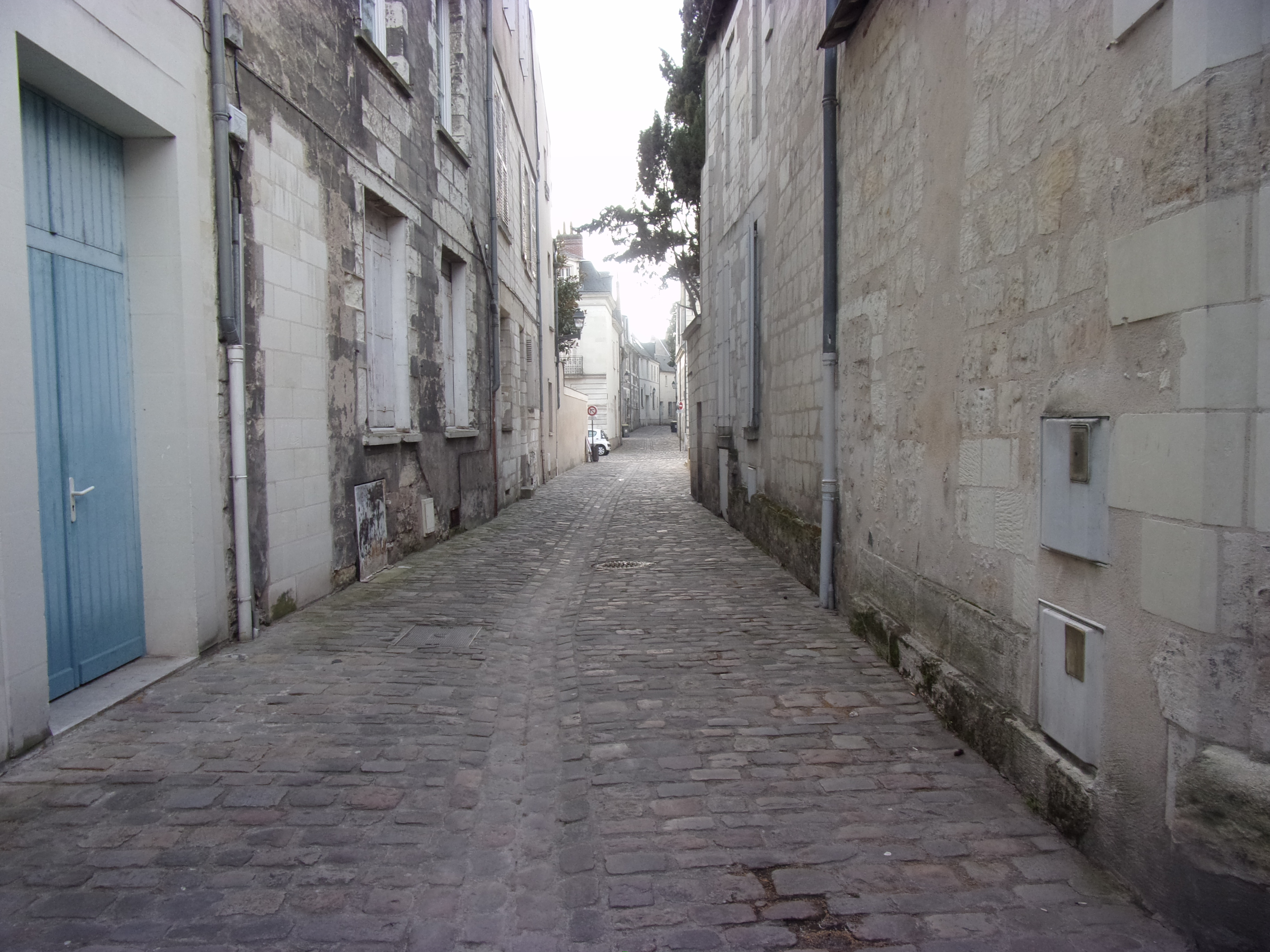
Baleschoux Street.

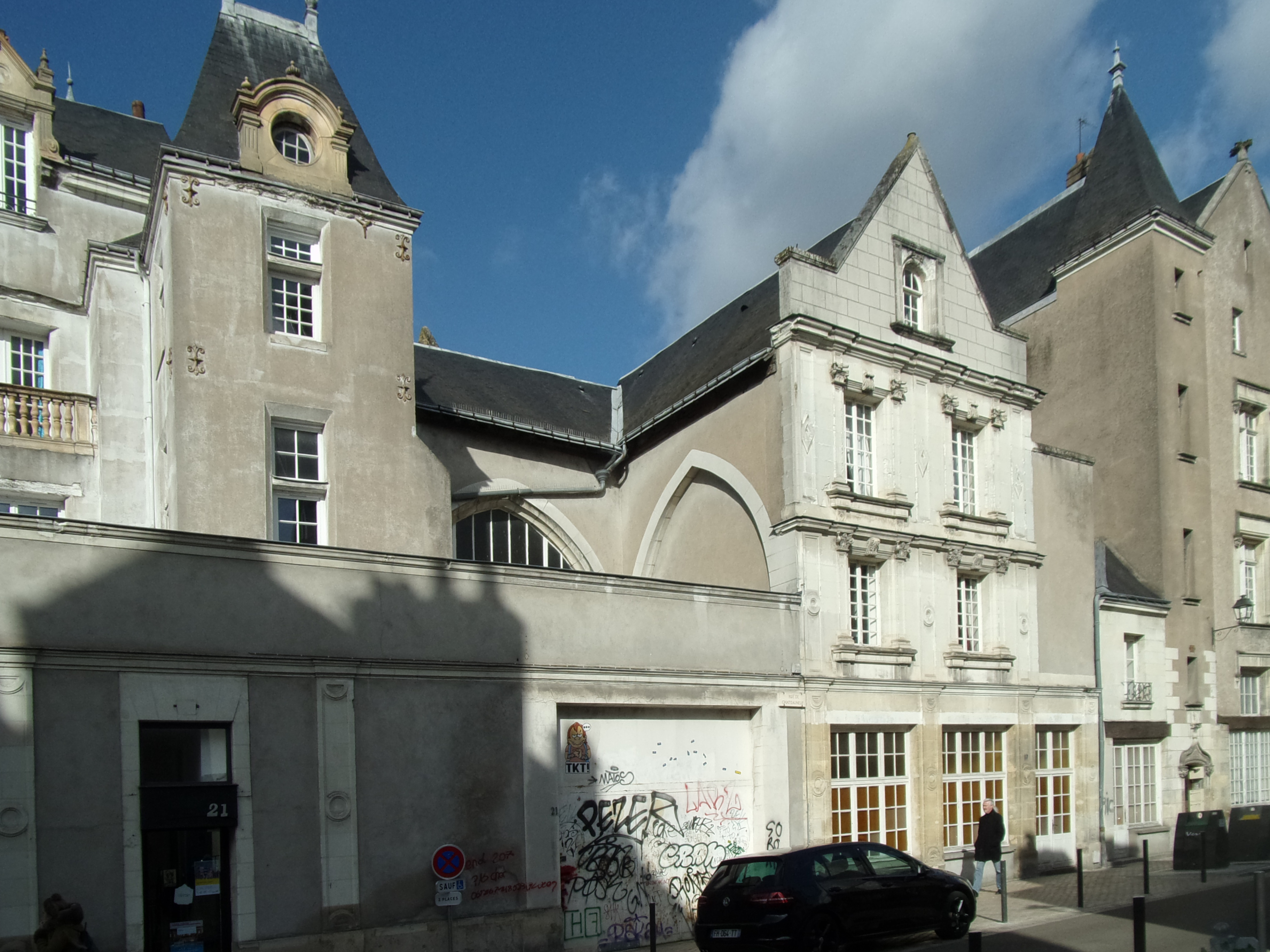
Former Church of Sainte-Croix.

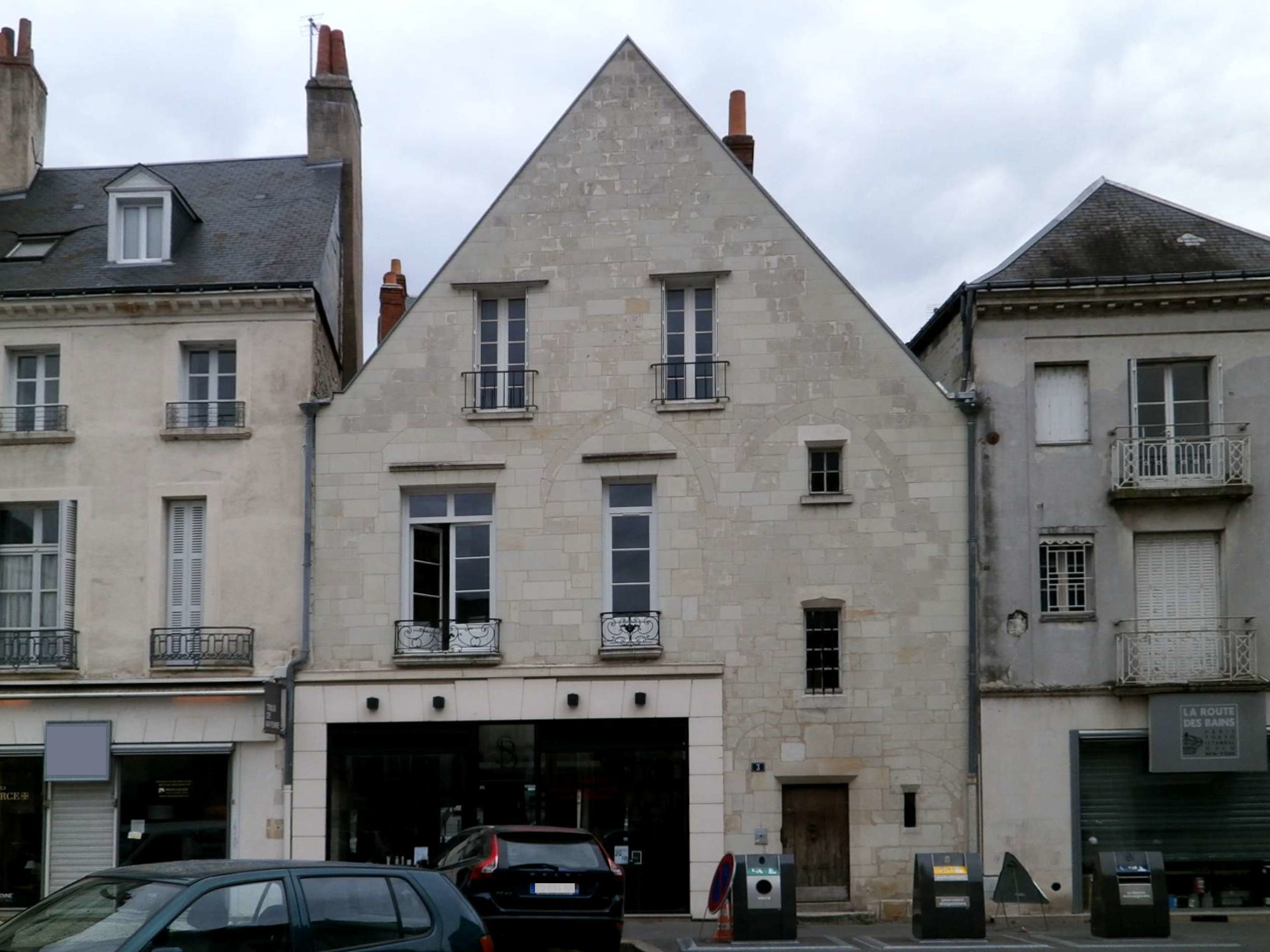
Annex of the former Church of Notre-Dame de l'Écrignole.

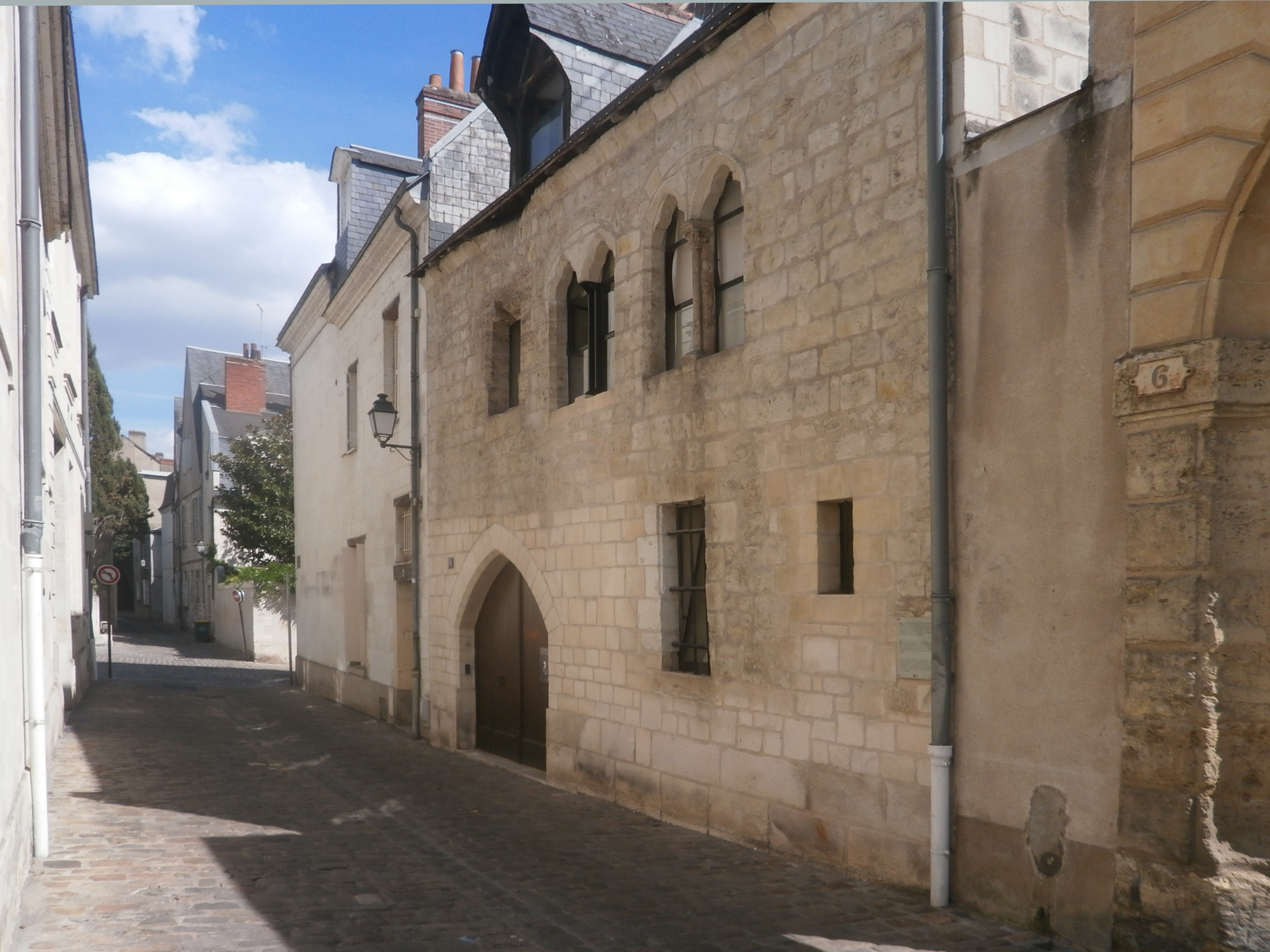
Former canon's house on Rapin Street.

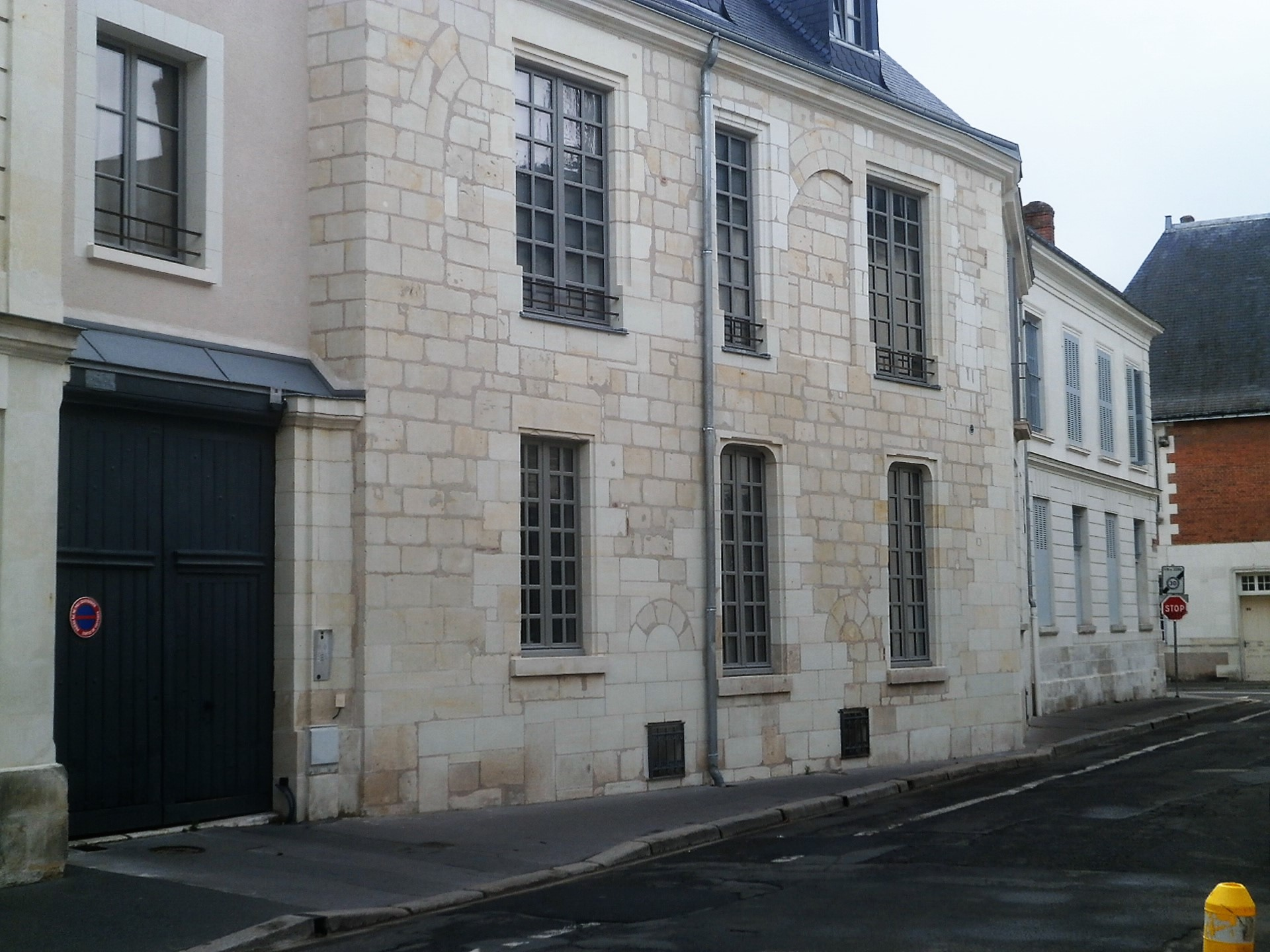
Former canon's house on Descartes Street.

=== Commercial activities to identify ===
The commercial development of Châteauneuf is generally attributed to a charter issued by Charles the Simple on December 1, 918, which granted the area immunity and broad administrative autonomy. A second charter, dated June 27, 919, extended this immunity to the territory between the Loire River and the enclosure. (Note: Noizet 2007, p. 98: Le castellum sancti Martini (903-938)) The term suburbium appeared in chapter records in 920. (Note: Noizet 2007, p. 215: Analyses contextuelles et statistiques du vocabulaire spatial de 918 à 1119)

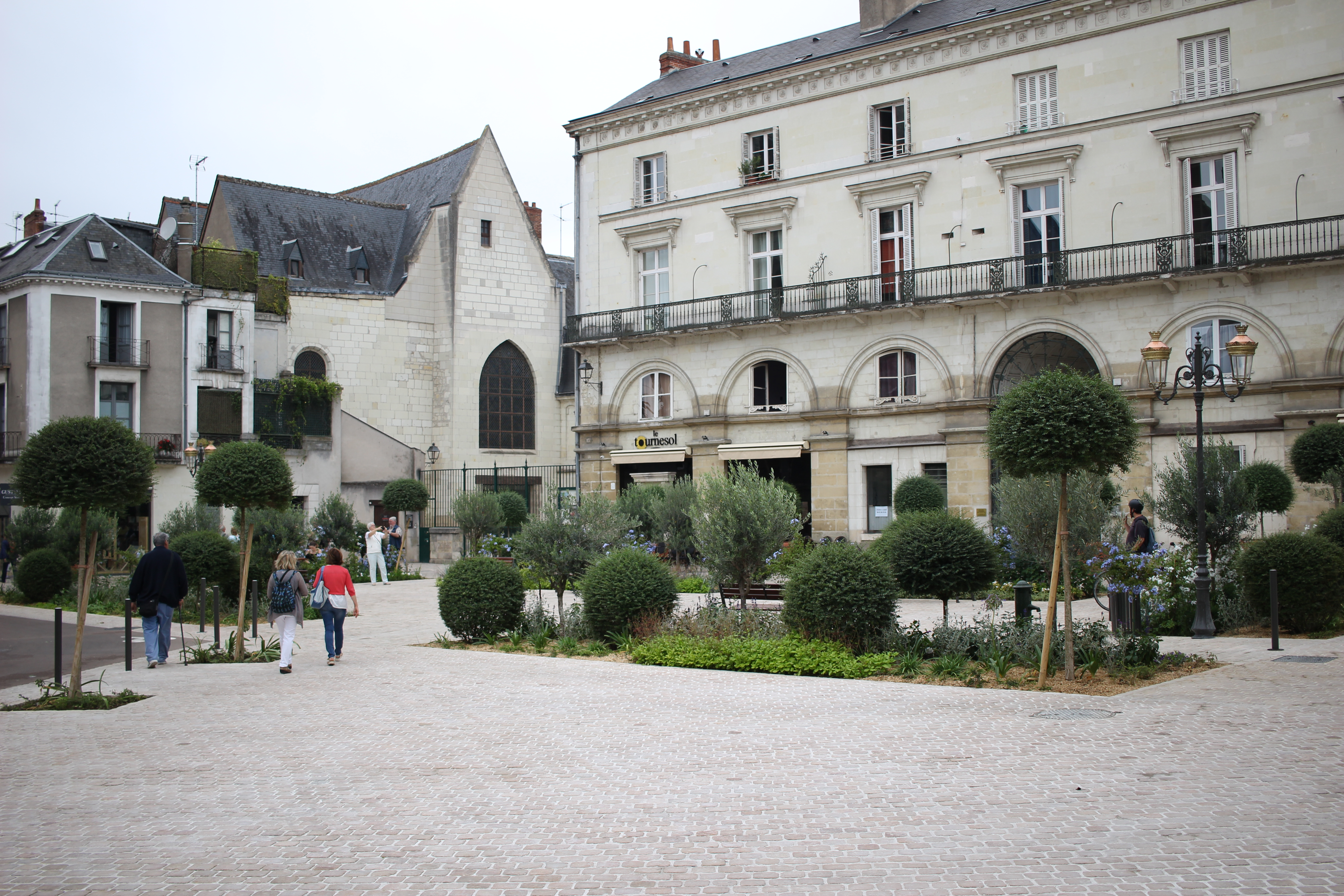
Châteauneuf Square.

Commercial activity in Châteauneuf is relatively poorly documented. However, the sale of pilgrimage medals is attested, and taverns were established outside the canonical enclosure. The canons retained exclusive rights to sell wine during certain periods of the year (a banvin privilege) and collected tithes on some sales during the remainder of the year. Numerous records of land sales and exchanges suggest a high level of economic activity, despite limited details on the individuals and roles involved. A charter issued by Charles the Simple in 919, which extended immunity to the area, also granted Châteauneuf the right to mint its currency. (Note: Noizet 2007, p. 101: Le castellum sancti Martini (903-938)) The denier of Saint-Martin initially competed with the coinage from the nearby Cité before surpassing it and eventually evolving into the livre tournois. (Note: The mint where the first Saint-Martin deniers were struck has not been located. It is not even certain that it was in Tours. Chinon and Orléans are other possibilities. (Note: Noizet 2007, pp. 101–102: Le castellum sancti Martini (903-938))) By the 11th century, money changers, bankers, and goldsmiths had settled near a square north of the basilica (present-day Place de Châteauneuf), where a market was already in operation. Two entrances to the basilica, one from the nave and another from the north end of the transept, opened onto this square. The porte du Change (Change Gate), one of these entrances, was considered the principal access point to the basilica. A bakery, likely located near the northeastern corner of the enclosure but outside its limits, provided bread to the canons and individuals connected to the chapter. (Note: Noizet 2007, p. 116: Le castellum sancti Martini (903-938)) To the west of the enclosure, a gatehouse and the collegiate church’s storehouses were positioned, probably along the main road running east–west through Châteauneuf.

== Chronology ==
Timeline of the Châteauneuf Enclosure, from its construction to its abandonment. Episode in the history of France and of Tours directly related to the evolution of the enclosure - Construction phase - Destruction or weakening phase

== Remains ==
From June 19 to 22, 1940, a large portion of northern Tours was destroyed by a fire caused by German artillery. The affected area extended westward to the eastern side of the Châteauneuf enclosure. After the war, plans were considered to highlight the surviving elements of the enclosure—such as towers and wall sections—through the creation of an archaeological garden. However, the urgency of postwar reconstruction to rehouse displaced residents led to the project's abandonment.

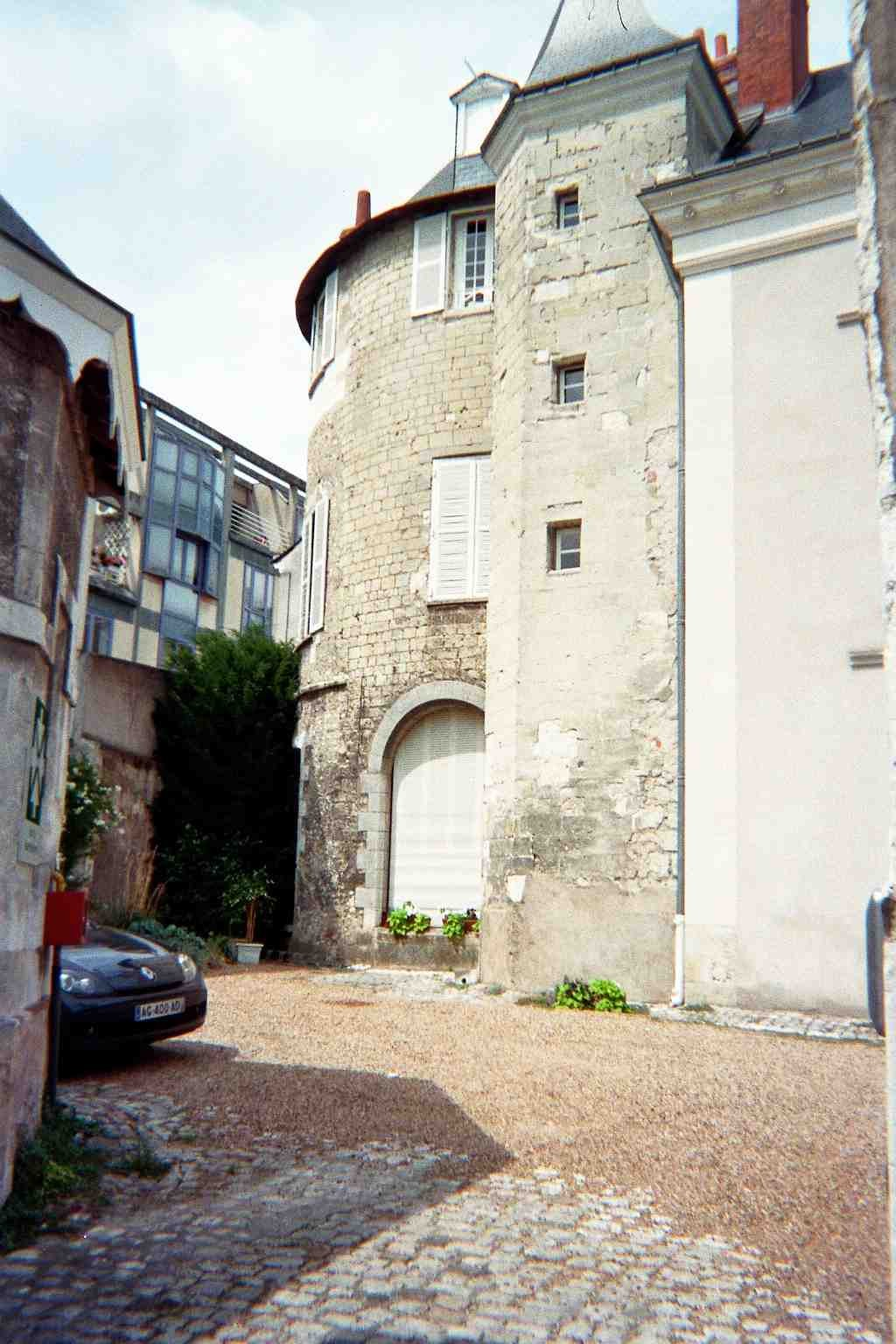
South tower.

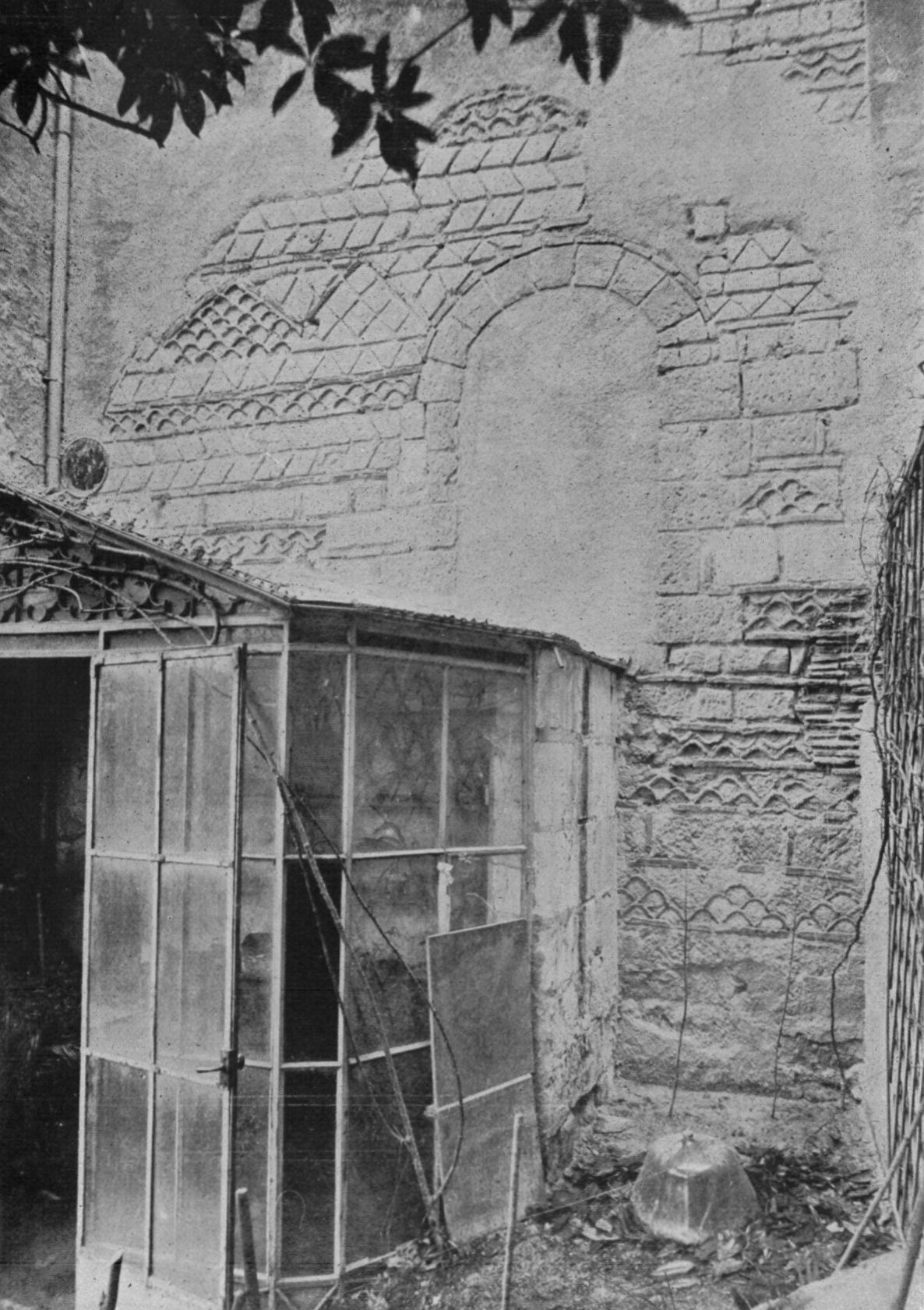
Carolingian decoration.

The Châteauneuf enclosure, Rue Néricault-Destouches.

Two remains of the Châteauneuf enclosure are currently well documented and visible above ground.

The most prominent is a defensive tower, accompanied by a short section of wall, located in the courtyard of No. 10 Rue Baleschoux (47.393053, 0.68391). This tower, originally part of the eastern defensive line, is partially buried—what appears to be the ground floor is the original first floor. It is constructed with small, irregular masonry and projects outward from the wall. The structure underwent repairs and modifications during the Romanesque period and again in the 13th century. Another remnant is situated in the courtyard of No. 59 Rue Néricault-Destouches, currently occupied by the Center for Advanced Renaissance Studies (47.391972, 0.682129). This tower, located on the southern section of the enclosure, has been heavily altered, with little of the original architecture remaining.

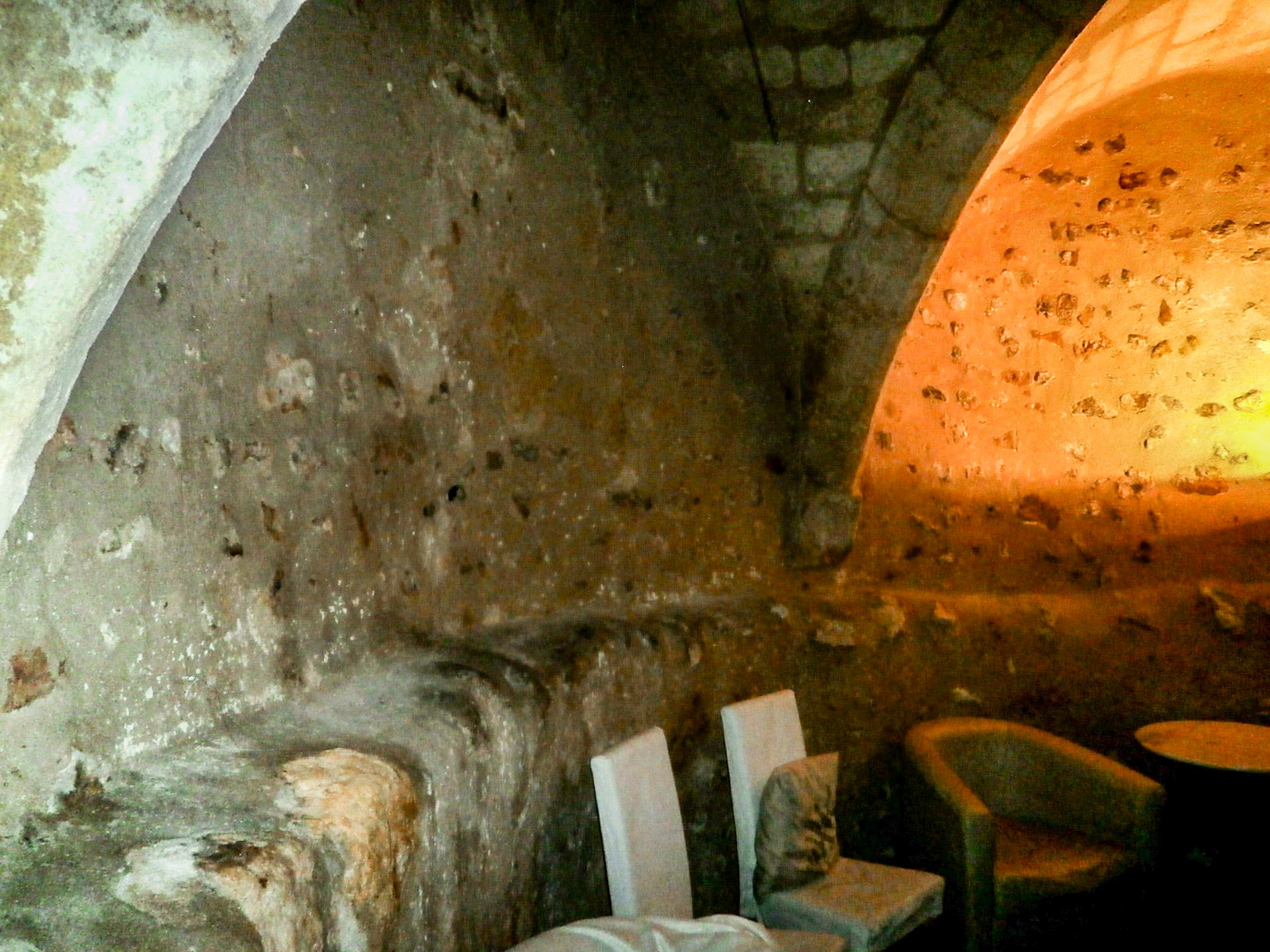
Northeast tower converted into a cellar, Rue des Bons-Enfants.

Another remnant of the Châteauneuf enclosure is located in the courtyard of the Hôtel Princé on Rue Néricault-Destouches (47.392034, 0.682691). This structure features a wall facing with a Carolingian decorative pattern composed of alternating bricks and stones. Some scholars, including Charles Lelong, interpret this fragment as part of the southern section of the enclosure, possibly near or forming part of a gate. Other interpretations suggest it may be the gable of an unidentified Carolingian church later incorporated into the curtain wall. Additional elements of the enclosure, including sections of curtain walls, foundations, and tower bases, remain embedded within modern buildings. These remnants are often difficult to access, such as those located in private cellars on Rue des Bons-Enfants (47.393915, 0.683445). (Note: Galinié 2007, p. 261)

Several portions of the enclosure were listed as historical monuments in 1940, 1941, and 1950.

== Historical and archaeological studies ==
Among the available documentation, the sources cited in this section provide specific insights into the history, architecture, and function of the enclosure.

In La Touraine ancienne et moderne (1845), Stanislas Bellanger describes the enclosure and advocates for further research to enhance understanding and preservation. His recommendations were not followed at the time.

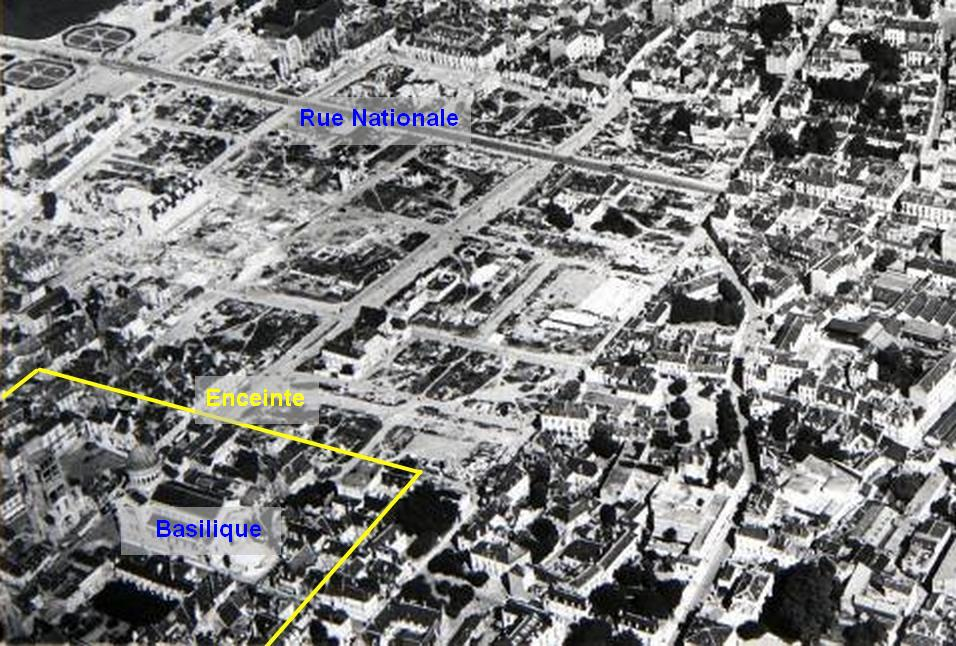
The walls of Châteauneuf in Old Tours, destroyed in 1940.

The destruction caused by the fires of June 1940 allowed for a more detailed study of the eastern side of the Châteauneuf enclosure. Initial clearing operations began in the autumn of 1940, enabling architect René Baldet to produce plans for this section of the fortification. Further investigations were carried out in subsequent years by Henry Auvray, Raoul Lehoux (whose work remains unpublished), and Jean-Edmond Weelen. There is no evidence of coordination or information sharing among these researchers. In 1950, archivist Jean Massiet du Biest and René Baldet produced a report summarizing the state of knowledge on the eastern face of the enclosure; however, only 25 copies were printed, and the document was not widely disseminated.

In 1982, Sylvain Livernet published his doctoral thesis La conservation des éléments anciens dans une ville moderne, which examines the historical evolution of the Châteauneuf enclosure and its integration into changing urban landscapes.

In 2001, Didier Dubant and Emmanuelle Coffineau presented the findings of a 1989 excavation conducted in the northeastern corner of the enclosure during the construction of an underground parking facility. This study contributed to a better understanding of the structure and history of the ditch adjacent to the curtain wall.

The collective volume Tours antique et médiéval. Lieux de vie, temps de la ville. 40 ans d’archéologie urbaine, published in 2007 under the direction of Henri Galinié, includes several chapters dedicated to the Châteauneuf enclosure. These address its archaeological remains, its role in the urban layout, and the political implications of its construction.

In 2007, medieval historian Hélène Noizet published La fabrique de la ville: espaces et sociétés à Tours (IXe–XIIIe siècle), based on her 2003 doctoral thesis. The study examines the development and functioning of the Saint Martin district and the political role of the Châteauneuf enclosure.

In 2013, Émeline Marot contributed a chapter to the collective volume Archéologie de l’espace urbain, focusing on the history of Châteauneuf from the 10th to the 12th century and its relationship with other urban centers in the Tours area. This work also addresses the possible existence of an earlier wooden enclosure.

== See also ==
- Defensive wall

== Bibliography ==
=== Documentation specifically devoted to Châteauneuf or its walls ===
- Baldet, René; Massiet du Biest, Jean (1950). La face Est de l'enceinte de la Martinopole à Tours (906-920 et XIIe-XIIIe) [The eastern side of the Martinopole enclosure in Tours (906-920 and 12th-13th centuries)] (in French). Tours.
- Dubant, Didier; Coffineau, Emmanuelle (2001). "Fouilles de la rue du Petit Soleil, rue de la Monnaie à Tours, rapport préliminaire" [Excavations on Rue du Petit Soleil and Rue de la Monnaie in Tours, preliminary report]. Bulletin de la Société archéologique de Touraine (in French). XLVII: 19–31. ISSN 1153-2521.
- Fischer, Guylène (1997). "Évolution du site de Châteauneuf du IVe au XIe siècle et de son rempart, Tours" [Development of the site of Châteauneuf from the 4th to the 11th century and its ramparts, Tours]. Mémoire de la Société archéologique de Touraine (in French). LXII: 87–92.
- Lehoux, Raoul. Fonds privé FP 020C : Martinopole [Private fund FP 020C: Martinopole] (in French). Société archéologique de Touraine.
- Lelong, Charles (1970). "L'enceinte du castrum sancti Martini (Tours)" [The walls of the Castrum Sancti Martini (Tours)]. Bulletin archéologique du Comité des travaux historiques et scientifiques (in French): 42–56.
- Marot, Émeline (2013). "Châteauneuf (Tours) : construction d'une identité urbaine aux Xe – XIIe siècles" [Châteauneuf (Tours): building an urban identity in the 10th–12th centuries]. Archéologie de l'espace urbain [Archaeology of urban space] (in French). Presses universitaires François-Rabelais. pp. 221–234. doi:10.4000/books.pufr.7670. ISBN 978-2-86906-311-2.

=== Publications devoted to history, architecture, or archaeology in Tours ===
- Audin, Pierre (2012). La Touraine autour de l'an mil : inventaire des sources historiques et archéologiques : mémoire de la Société archéologique de Touraine [La Touraine around the year 1000: inventory of historical and archaeological sources: thesis by the Société archéologique de Touraine] (in French). Vol. LXIX.
- Chevalier, Bernard (1972). "La Cité de Tours et Châteauneuf du Xe au XIIIe siècle" [The City of Tours and Châteauneuf from the 10th to the 13th century]. Cahiers d'histoire (in French). XVII: 237–247.
- Chevalier, Bernard (1994). Histoire de Tours [History of Tours] (in French). Toulouse: Privat. ISBN 2-7089-8224-9.
- Couderc, Jean-Mary (1989). La Touraine insolite : série 1 [Unusual Touraine: series 1] (in French). Chambray-lès-Tours: CLD. ISBN 2-8544-3178-2.
- Galinié, Henri; Randoin, Bernard (1979). Les archives du sol à Tours : survie et avenir de l'archéologie de la ville [The soil archives in Tours: survival and future of the city's archaeology] (in French). Société archéologique de Touraine et Laboratoire d'archéologie urbaine de Tours.
- Galinié, Henri (2007). Tours antique et médiéval. Lieux de vie, temps de la ville. 40 ans d'archéologie urbaine [Ancient and medieval towers. Places of life, times of the city. 40 years of urban archaeology] (in French). Tours: FERACF. ISBN 978-2-913272-15-6.
- Giraudet, Eugène (1873). Histoire de la ville de Tours [History of the city of Tours] (in French). Vol. I. Tours.
- Lelong, Charles (1986). La basilique de Saint-Martin de Tours [The Basilica of Saint Martin of Tours] (in French). Chambray-lès-Tours: CLD. ISBN 2 8544-3122-7.
- Leveel, Pierre (1994). La Touraine disparue et ses abords immédiats [The lost Touraine region and its immediate surroundings] (in French). Chambray-lès-Tours: CLD. ISBN 2-8544-3253-3.
- Livernet, Sylvain (1982). Tours du XVIIIe au XXe siècle. La conservation des éléments anciens dans une ville moderne (thèse de doctorat) [Towers from the 18th to the 20th century. Preserving old elements in a modern city (doctoral thesis)] (in French). Vol. I & II. Lille: Université de Lille.
- Noizet, Hélène (2007). La fabrique de la ville : espaces et sociétés à Tours (IXe – XIIIe siècle) [The city factory: spaces and societies in Tours (9th–13th centuries)] (in French). Panthéon-Sorbonne University. ISBN 978-2-8594-4572-0.
- Ranjard, Robert (1989). La Touraine archéologique : guide du touriste en Indre-et-Loire [Archaeological Touraine: tourist guide to Indre-et-Loire] (in French). Mayenne: Imprimerie de la Manutention. pp. 670–671. ISBN 2-8555-4017-8.
- Weelen, Jean-Edmond (1942). Notre vieux Tours (première série) : Le quartier de la rue Nationale [Our old Tours (first series): The National Street neighborhood] (in French). Tours: Arrault et Cie.
