= Henri Galinié =

French archaeologist

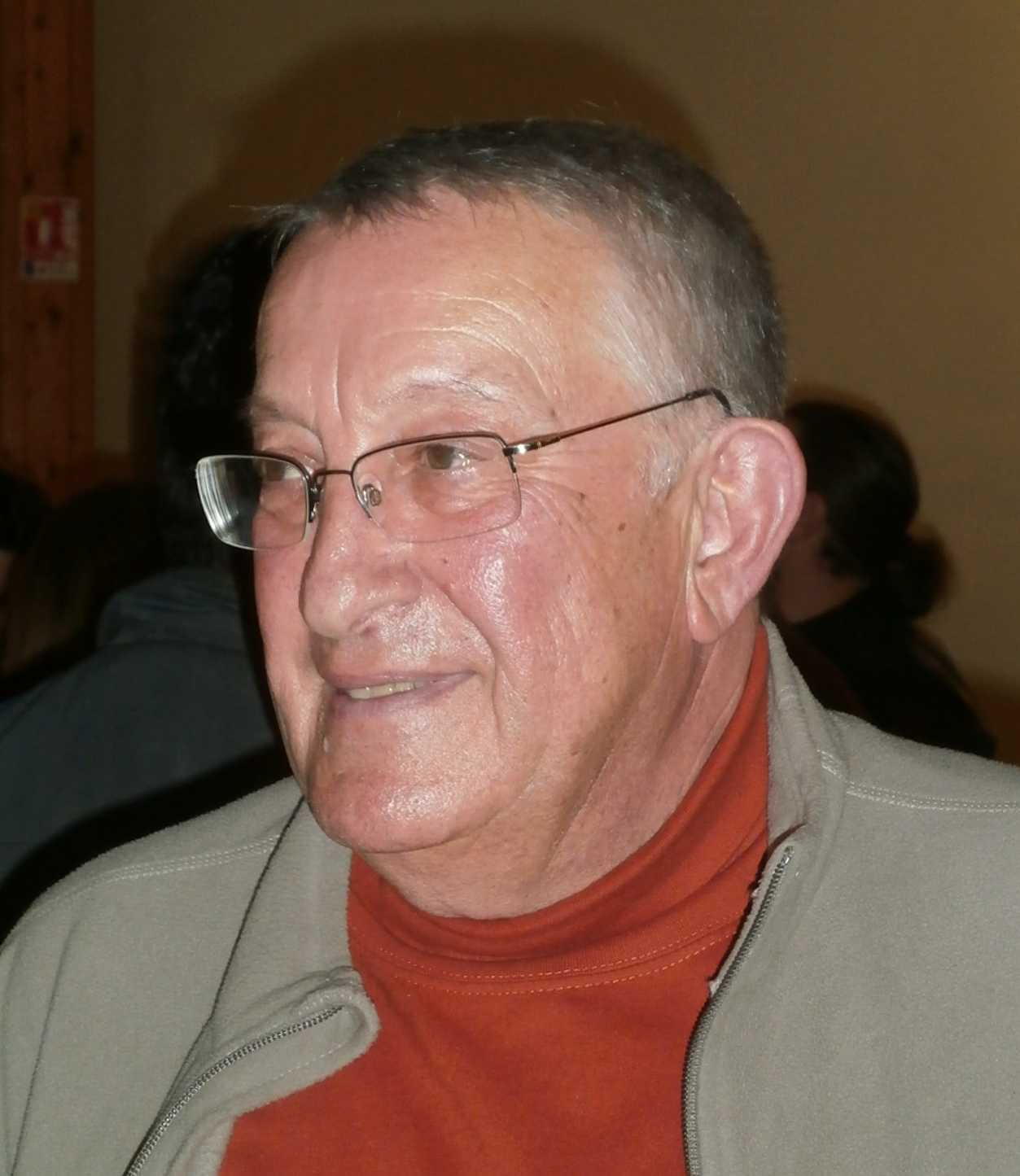
- Born: 2 March 1946 (age 80); Nouméa (New Caledonia)
- Occupation: Archaeologist
- Known for: Urban archaeology

Henri Galinié is a French archaeologist specializing in antiquity, the Middle Ages, and the transition between these two periods. He is also one of the promoters of the special status of urban archaeology.

Since his retirement, he has devoted himself to the historical study of grape varieties in France, particularly in the Loire Valley.

== Biography and work ==
Born on 2 March 1946 in Nouméa (New Caledonia), Henri Galinié moved to metropolitan France in 1959. After studies at Paris (Sorbonne) and Caen, he earned a PhD in History from the University of Caen in 1981, based on a thesis on the topography of Tours from the 4th to the 11th century. In parallel, he trained in archaeology at Winchester (Hampshire, United Kingdom), where he participated in the excavation of Wolvesey Castle under the direction of Martin Biddle.

Galinié settled in Tours in 1970. After eight years teaching at the University Institute of Technology in Tours, he joined the French National Centre for Scientific Research (CNRS). Since 1992, he has taught archaeology at the University of Tours, and he has supervised numerous PhD theses in History.

Focused on establishing the specific status of urban archaeology, (Jean-Mary Couderc, quoted by Pierre Audin, described him as the "mastermind of the urban archaeological revolution in Tours"), Galinié founded the Urban Archaeology Laboratory of Tours (LAUT) in 1973; in 1984, the LAUT became the National Center for Urban Archaeology (CNAU), under the Ministry of Culture, and Galinié directed it from 1984 to 1992. This structure was then replaced by the Archaeology and Territories Laboratory (LAT), a CNRS unit that later became joint with the University of Tours, following a collaboration between the CNRS and the university; Galinié led it until 2003. With the same objective, he organized the first International Colloquium on Urban Archaeology in Tours from 17 to 20 November 1980, at the request of the Ministry of Culture.

A field archaeologist, he led numerous excavations in Tours and Touraine, including:

- 1969–1974: Saint-Pierre-le-Puellier (Tours)
- 1974–78: Château de Tours (Tours)
- 1978–82: Departmental archives (Tours)
- 1979–82: Cloître Saint-Martin (Tours)
- 1995–2001: Rigny-Ussé
- 2000–2003: Square Prosper-Mérimée (Tours)

He is also known as an author, co-author, or editor for his articles and books on the ancient and medieval city of Tours and for his contributions to understanding the Antiquity/Middle Ages transition in urban settings (the archaeological concept of dark earths):

- Galinié, Henri; Randoin, Bernard; et al. (1979). Les archives du sol à Tours: Survie et avenir de l'archéologie de la ville [The soil archives in Tours: Survival and future of the city's archaeology] (in French). Tours: La Simarre. p. 63.
- G., H. (1981). Recherches sur la topographie de Tours, ivème-xième siècle [Research on the topography of Tours, 4th-11th century] (in French). p. 576.
- H.G. (1988). "L'archéologie urbaine française face à des choix, Actes du Colloque « Archaologisch-historischen Stadtforshung », (Münster 1982)" [French urban archaeology facing choices, Proceedings of the Colloquium "Archaeological-Historical City Research" (Münster 1982)]. Lübecker Schriften zur Archäologie und Kulturgeschichte (in German). 14: 163–170.
- H.G. (1991). "L'archéologie urbaine française, recherche et information, Actes du colloque « Roma e le capitali europee dell'archeologia », (Rome, 1991)" [French urban archaeology, research and information, Proceedings of the colloquium "Rome and the European capitals of archaeology" (Rome, 1991)]. Eutopia (in Italian). I (2): 125–132.
- H.G.; Royo, Manuel (1994). Atlas des villes et des réseaux de villes en région Centre: Fascicule 2 [Atlas of cities and city networks in the Centre region: Booklet 2] (in French). Archea. p. 73. ISBN 978-2-9507320-2-6.
- Karkov, Catherine E.; Wickham-Crowley, Kelly M.; Young, Bailey K.; H.G. (1999). "Tours from an archaeological standpoint". Spaces of the Living and the Dead: An Archaeological Dialogue. American Early Medieval Studies. New York: Oxbow Books. p. 162. ISBN 978-1-900188-81-4.
- Macphail, Richard; Galinié, H.; Verhaeghe, Frans (2003). "A future for Dark Earth?". Antiquity. 77 (296): 349–358. doi:10.1017/S0003598X00092334.
- H.G. (2004). "L'expression « terres noires », un concept d'attente" [The term "dark earths", a concept of anticipation] (PDF). Les petits cahiers d'Anatole (in French) (15): 29.
- H.G. (2007). Tours antique et médiéval. Lieux de vie, temps de la ville. 40 ans d'archéologie urbaine (editor) (in French). Vol. 30th supplement to the Revue archéologique du Centre de la France (RACF), special issue of the Recherches sur Tours collection. Tours: FERACF. p. 440. ISBN 978-2-913272-15-6.
- H.G. (2013). Ville, espace urbain et archéologie [City, urban space, and archaeology] (in French). Presses universitaires François-Rabelais. p. 136. ISBN 978-2-86906-350-1.
- Galinié, H.; Husi, Philippe; Motteau, James; et al. (2014). Des Thermes de l'Est de Caesarodunum au Château de Tours : le site 3 [From the Eastern Baths of Caesarodunum to the Château de Tours: Site 3]. Recherches sur Tours 9 (in French). Tours: FERACF. p. 170. ISBN 978-2-913272-36-1. S3.

A more complete list of publications is available in the Base Malraux (Ministry of Culture).

He created the archaeology journals Recherches sur Tours (10 volumes published between 1981 and 2014), À propos d'archéologie urbaine, and relaunched the Revue archéologique du Centre de la France.

At the end of the 2008 academic year, due to retirement, Galinié left teaching and the CNRS with the title of honorary research director. He continues to publish articles and excavation reports, and devotes himself to retrospective ampelography, particularly in Touraine via a blog, and more broadly for France through several publications, including the transcription of L'enquête de Nicolas Dupré de Saint-Maur pour fixer la nomenclature de la vigne (1782–1784) and coordination of the CepAtlas project.

== Publications ==
Publications by Henri Galinié (listed as H. G. in author lists).

=== 1974–1980 ===
- G., H.; Schweitz, D. (1974). "Une production de céramique commune à Tours au XVe siècle" [A common ceramic production in Tours in the 15th century]. Mémoire de la Société Archéologique de Touraine (in French). 8: 90–99.
- G., H. (1976). "Fouilles archéologiques sur le site de Saint-Pierre-le-Puellier à Tours (1969–1974), rapport préliminaire" [Archaeological excavations on the site of Saint-Pierre-le-Puellier in Tours (1969–1974), preliminary report]. Bulletin de la Société Archéologique de Touraine (in French). XXXVIII: 155–172.
- G., H. (1977). "La résidence des comtes d'Anjou à Tours au XIe siècle" [The residence of the Counts of Anjou in Tours in the 11th century]. Archéologie Médiévale (in French) (7): 95–107.
- G., H. (1978). "Archéologie et topographie historique de Tours, IVe–XIe siècle" [Archaeology and historical topography of Tours, 4th–11th centuries]. Zeitschrift für Archäologie des Mittelalters (in French) (6): 33–56.
- G., H. (1978). "Fouilles archéologiques sur le site du Château de Tours (1974–1978), rapport préliminaire" [Archaeological excavations on the site of the Château de Tours (1974–1978), preliminary report]. Bulletin de la Société Archéologique de Touraine (in French). XXXVIII: 638–662.
- G., H. (1978). "Compte rendu de Winchester Studies I, Winchester in the early Middle Ages" [Review of Winchester Studies I, Winchester in the early Middle Ages]. Archéologie Médiévale (in French) (8): 307–313.
- G., H.; Randoin, Bernard (1978). Les Archives du sol à Tours, survie et avenir de l'archéologie de la ville [The soil archives in Tours, survival and future of urban archaeology] (in French). Tours: Société archéologique de Touraine. p. 72.
- G., H. (1979). "Droit de cité pour l'archéologie urbaine" [Citizenship rights for urban archaeology]. Nouvelles de l'Archéologie (in French): 6–10.
- G., H. (1979). "Fouilles archéologiques à Tours (1978–1979), rapport préliminaire" [Archaeological excavations in Tours (1978–1979), preliminary report]. Bulletin de la Société Archéologique de Touraine (in French). XXXIX: 201–248.
- G., H. (1980). "Regard sur l'archéologie urbaine française" [A look at French urban archaeology]. Universalia (in French) (80): 411–413.
- Schnapp, A. (1980). "De la stratigraphie à la chronologie" [From stratigraphy to chronology]. L'archéologie aujourd'hui [Archaeology today]. Bibliothèque d'archéologie (in French). Vol. 5. Paris: Nouvelles de l'Archéologie. pp. 63–85.
- G., H. (1980). "Fouilles archéologiques à Tours, 1980, rapport préliminaire" [Archaeological excavations in Tours, 1980, preliminary report]. Bulletin de la Société Archéologique de Touraine (in French). XXXIX: 607–649.

=== 1981–1990 ===
- G., H. (1981). "La notion de territoire à Tours aux 9th–10th siècles" [The notion of territory in Tours in the 9th–10th centuries]. Recherches Sur Tours (in French) (1). Tours: 73–84.
- G., H. (1981). "Eléments d'un atelier de potier du Bas Moyen Âge à Tours" [Elements of a Late Middle Ages pottery workshop in Tours]. Recherches Sur Tours (in French) (1). Tours: 131–137.
- G., H. (1981). "Fouilles archéologiques à Tours, 1980, rapport préliminaire" [Archaeological excavations in Tours, 1980, preliminary report]. Bulletin de la Société Archéologique de Touraine (in French). XXXIX: 1041–1084.
- G., H. (1981). "Compte rendu de Ph. Holdsworth : Excavations at Melbourne Street, Southampton" [Review of Ph. Holdsworth: Excavations at Melbourne Street, Southampton]. Archéologie Médiévale (in French). XI: 348–349.
- G., H. (1982). "L'archéologie urbaine" [Urban archaeology]. Actes du colloque international d'archéologie urbaine, Tours, 1980 (in French). Paris: 21–25.
- G., H. (1982). "Expérience d'archéologie urbaine à Tours (1973–1980)" [Experience in urban archaeology in Tours (1973–1980)]. Actes du colloque international d'archéologie urbaine, Tours, 1980 (in French). Paris: 79–82.
- Galinié, H. (1982). "Tours". Actes du colloque international d'archéologie urbaine Tours 1980 (in French). Paris: 721–730.
- Galinié, H. (1982). "Compte rendu de Ph. Crummy, Aspects of Anglo-Saxon and Norman Colchester". Archéologie Médiévale (in French). XII: 397–399.
- Galinié, H. (1982). "La céramique peinte carolingienne de Tours". Mélanges d'archéologie et d'histoire médiévales en l'honneur du Doyen Michel de Boüard (in French). Genève-Paris. pp. 171–177.
- Galinié, H. (1982). "Fouilles archéologiques à Tours, 1982, rapport préliminaire". Bulletin de la Société Archéologique de Touraine (in French). 40: 153–199.

== See also ==
- Medieval archaeology
- Loire Valley wine
- Ampelography

== Bibliography ==
- Ferdière, Alain (2014). "Historique des recherches archéologiques" [History of archaeological research]. Atlas archéologique de Touraine (in French). Ferdière. Archived from the original on December 4, 2014.
- Galinié, Henri (1981). "La notion de territoire à Tours, aux IXe et Xe siècles" [The concept of territory in Tours in the 9th and 10th centuries]. Revue archéologique du centre de la France (in French): 73–84. Archived from the original on June 15, 2022.
- Galinié, Henri; Husi, Philippe; Motteau, James; et al. (2014). Des Thermes de l'Est de Caesarodunum au Château de Tours : le site 3 [From the Eastern Baths of Caesarodunum to the Château de Tours: Site 3]. Recherches sur Tours 9 (in French). Tours: FERACF. p. 170. ISBN 978-2-913272-36-1. Archived from the original on October 6, 2014.
- Audin, Pierre (2002). Tours à l'époque gallo-romaine [Tours in the Gallo-Roman period] (in French). Saint-Cyr-sur-Loire: Alan Sutton. p. 128. ISBN 978-2-84253-748-7.
- Provost, Michel (1988). L'Indre-et-Loire [The Indre-et-Loire]. Carte archéologique de la Gaule (in French). Vol. 37. Paris: Académie des Sciences et Belles-Lettres. p. 141. ISBN 2-87754-002-2.
