= Bastion fort =

Early modern fortification style built to withstand cannon fire

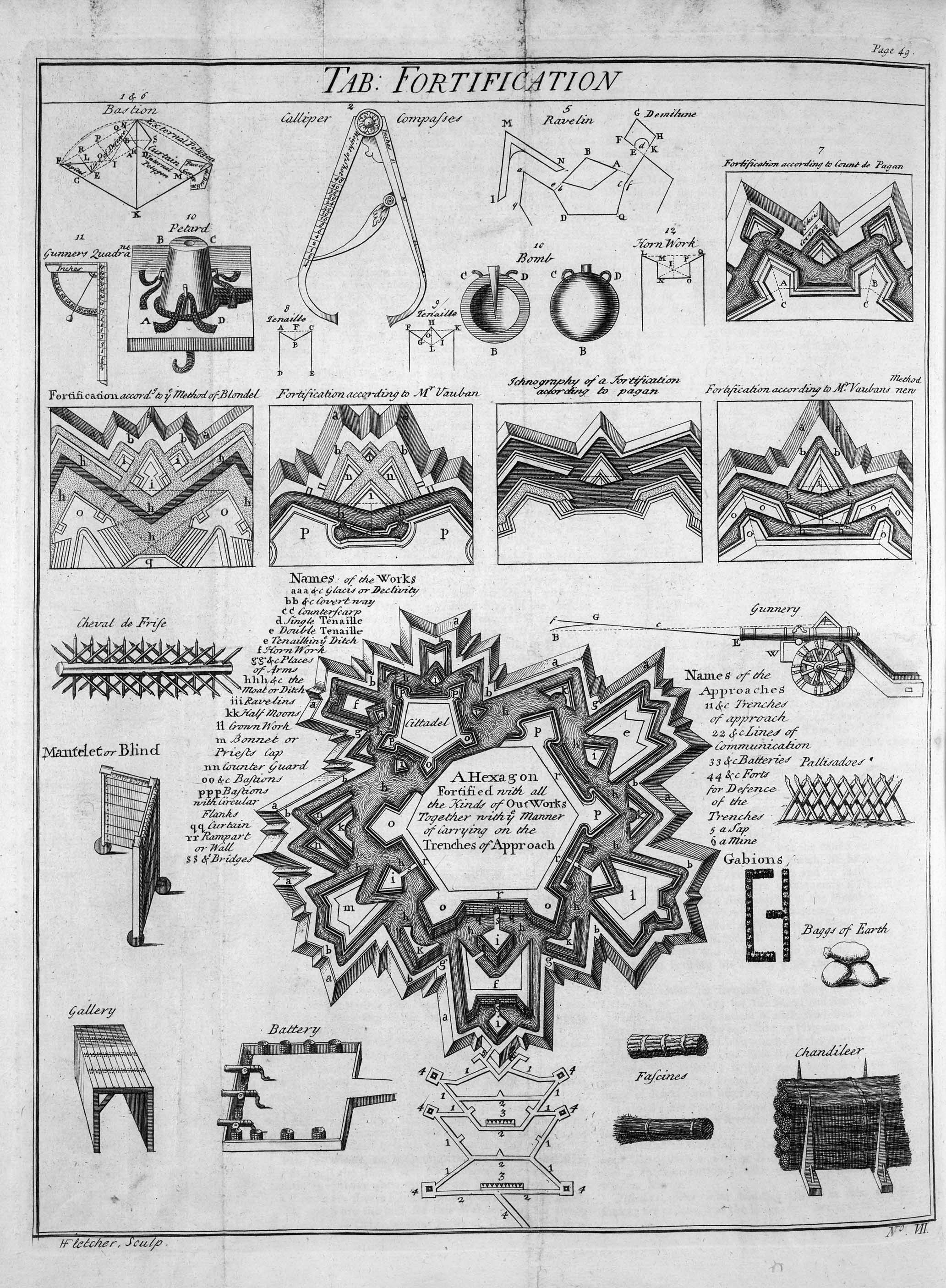
Features of bastion forts - Table of Fortification, from the 1728 Cyclopaedia

A bastion fort or trace italienne (a phrase derived from non-standard French, meaning 'Italian outline') is a style of fortification developed in Italy during the early modern period in response to the ascendancy of gunpowder weapons such as cannon, which rendered earlier medieval approaches to fortification obsolete.

The design is characterized by a polygonal curtain wall with pointed bastions protruding from each corner. Unlike earlier round and rectangular towers, the arrowhead shape of the bastions eliminated blind spots, called dead ground, that could shelter attackers, while defenders on the flank of each bastion could fire from protected positions at enemies attempting to scale or breach the adjacent curtain wall. The multi-pointed shape of a fort that encloses a town or other area resembles a star, giving rise to the commonly used term star fort.

== Origins ==
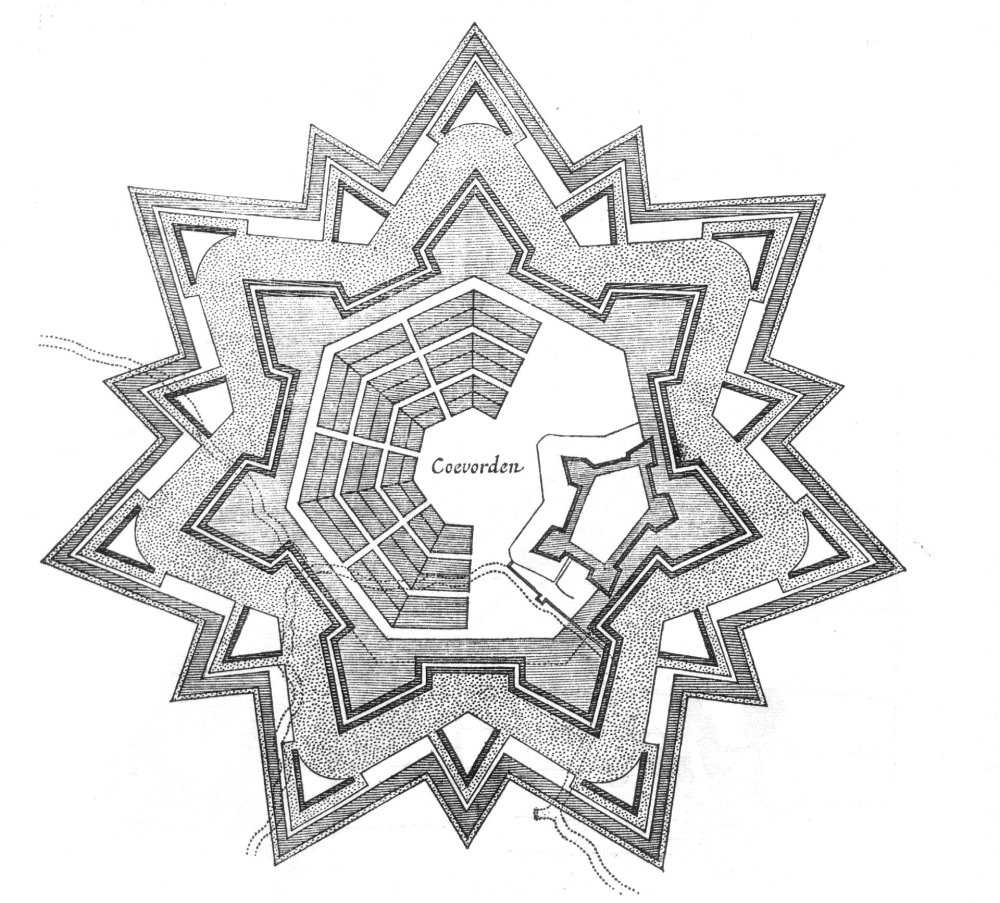
Fortification plan of Coevorden, laid out in a radial pattern within polygonal fortifications and extensive outer earthworks as rebuilt in the early seventeenth century by Maurice, Prince of Orange

Their predecessors, medieval fortresses, were usually placed on high hills. From there, arrows were shot at the enemies. The enemies' hope was to either ram the gate or climb over the wall with ladders and overcome the defenders. For the invading force these fortifications proved quite difficult to overcome and, accordingly, fortresses occupied a key position in warfare.

Passive ring-shaped (Enceinte) fortifications of the Medieval era proved vulnerable to damage or destruction when attackers directed cannon fire onto perpendicular masonry walls. In addition, attackers that could get close to the wall were able to conduct undermining operations in relative safety, as the defenders could not shoot at them from nearby walls, until the development of machicolation. In contrast, the bastion fortress was a very flat structure composed of many triangular bastions, specifically designed to cover each other, and a ditch. To counteract the cannonballs, defensive walls were made lower and thicker. To counteract the fact that lower walls were easier to climb, the ditch was widened so that attacking infantry were still exposed to fire from a higher elevation, including enfilading fire from the bastions.

The outer side of the ditch was usually provided with a glacis to deflect cannonballs aimed at the lower part of the main wall. Further structures, such as ravelins, tenailles, hornworks or crownworks, and even detached forts could be added to create complex outer works to further protect the main wall from artillery, and sometimes provide additional defensive positions. They were built of many materials, usually earth and brick, as brick does not shatter on impact from a cannonball as stone does.

Bastion fortifications were further developed in the late fifteenth and early sixteenth centuries, primarily in response to the French invasion of the Italian peninsula. The French army was equipped with new cannon and bombards that were easily able to destroy traditional fortifications built in the Middle Ages. Star forts were employed by Michelangelo in the defensive earthworks of Florence, and refined in the sixteenth century by Baldassare Peruzzi and Vincenzo Scamozzi. The design spread out of Italy in the 1530s and 1540s.

It was employed heavily throughout Europe for the following three centuries. Italian engineers were heavily in demand throughout Europe to help build the new fortifications. The late-seventeenth-century architects Menno van Coehoorn and especially Vauban, Louis XIV's military engineer, are considered to have taken the form to its logical extreme. "Fortresses... acquired ravelins and redoubts, bonnettes and lunettes, tenailles and tenaillons, counterguards and crownworks and hornworks and curvettes and faussebrayes and scarps and cordons and banquettes and counterscarps..."

The star-shaped fortification had a formative influence on the patterning of the Renaissance ideal city: "The Renaissance was hypnotized by one city type which for a century and a half—from Filarete to Scamozzi—was impressed upon all utopian schemes: this is the star-shaped city". In the nineteenth century, the development of the explosive shell changed the nature of defensive fortifications. Elvas, in Portugal is considered by some to be the best surviving example of the Dutch school of fortifications.

=== Slopes ===
When the newly-effective manoeuvrable siege cannon came into military strategy in the fifteenth century, the response from military engineers was to arrange for the walls to be embedded into ditches fronted by earthen slopes (glacis) so that they could not be attacked by destructive direct fire, and to have the walls topped by earthen banks that absorbed and largely dissipated the energy of plunging fire. Where conditions allowed, as in Fort Manoel in Malta, the ditches were cut into the native rock, and the wall at the inside of the ditch was simply unquarried native rock. As the walls became lower, they also became more vulnerable to assault.

=== Dead zone ===
The rounded shape that had previously been dominant for the design of turrets created "dead space", or "dead zones", which were relatively sheltered from defending fire, because direct fire from other parts of the defences could not be directed around curved walls. To prevent this, what had previously been round or square turrets were extended into diamond-shaped points to eliminate potential cover for attacking troops. The ditches and walls channelled the attackers into carefully constructed zwinger, bailey, or similar "kill zone" areas where the attackers had no place to shelter from the fire of the defenders.

=== Enfilade ===
A further and more subtle change was to move from a passive model of defence to an active one. The lower walls were more vulnerable to being stormed, and the protection that the earthen banking provided against direct fire failed if the attackers could occupy the slope on the outside of the ditch and mount an attacking cannon there. Therefore, the shape was designed to make maximum use of enfilade (or flanking) fire against any attackers on the outer edge of the ditch and against any who should reach the base of any of the walls. The indentations in the base of each point on the star sheltered cannons. Those cannons would have a clear line of fire directly down the edge of the neighbouring points, while their point of the star was protected by fire from the base of those points. The evolution of these ideas can be seen in transitional fortifications such as Sarzana in northwest Italy.

=== Other changes ===
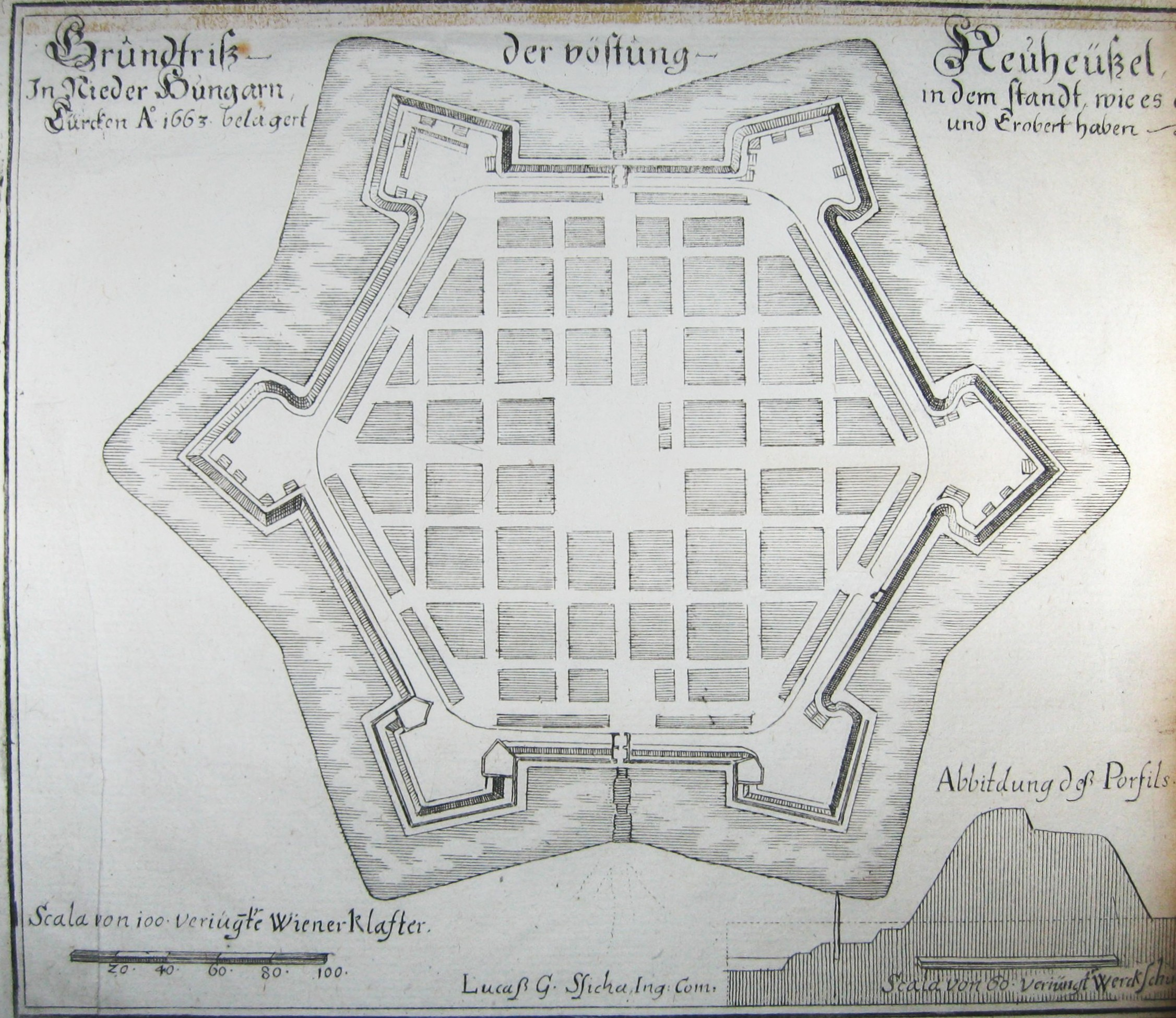
Ideal fortified city: a plan of Nové Zámky (Neuhäusel) in Slovakia, built in 1663, drawn c. 1680

Thus forts evolved complex shapes that allowed defensive batteries of cannon to command interlocking fields of fire. Forward batteries commanded the slopes which defended walls deeper in the complex from direct fire. The defending cannon were not simply intended to deal with attempts to storm the walls, but to actively challenge attacking cannon and deny them approach close enough to the fort to engage in direct fire against the vulnerable walls.

The key to the fort's defence moved to the outer edge of the ditch surrounding the fort, known as the covered way, or covert way. Defenders could move relatively safely in the cover of the ditch and could engage in active countermeasures to keep control of the glacis, the open slope that lay outside the ditch, by creating defensive earthworks to deny the enemy access to the glacis and thus to firing points that could bear directly onto the walls and by digging counter mines to intercept and disrupt attempts to mine the fort walls.

Compared to medieval fortifications, forts became both lower and larger in area, providing defence in depth, with tiers of defences that an attacker needed to overcome in order to bring cannon to bear on the inner layers of defences.

Firing emplacements for defending cannon were heavily defended from bombardment by external fire, but open towards the inside of the fort, not only to diminish their usefulness to the attacker should they be overcome, but also to allow the large volumes of smoke that the defending cannon would generate to dissipate.

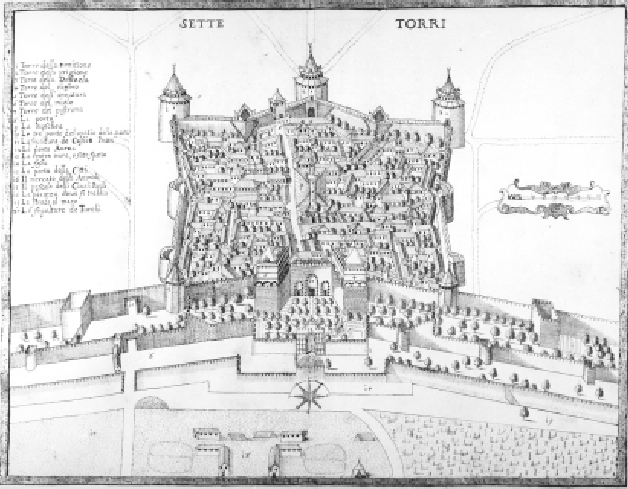
Yedikule, which was built in 1458, is the oldest known star-shaped fortification.

Fortifications of this type continued to be effective while the attackers were armed only with cannon, where the majority of the damage inflicted was caused by momentum from the impact of solid shot. Because only low explosives such as black powder were available, explosive shells were largely ineffective against such fortifications. The development of mortars, high explosives, and the consequent large increase in the destructive power of explosive shells and thus plunging fire rendered the intricate geometry of such fortifications irrelevant. Warfare was to become more mobile. It took, however, many years to abandon the old fortress thinking.

== Construction ==
Bastion forts were very expensive. Amsterdam's 22 bastions cost 11 million florins, and Siena in 1544 bankrupted itself to pay for its defences. For this reason, bastion forts were often improvised from earlier defences. Medieval curtain walls were lowered, and a ditch was dug in front of them. The earth used from the excavation was piled behind the walls to create a solid structure. While purpose-built fortifications would often have a brick fascia because of the material's ability to absorb the shock of artillery fire, many improvised defences cut costs by leaving this stage out and instead opting for more earth. Improvisation could also consist of lowering medieval round towers and infilling them with earth to strengthen the structures.

It was also often necessary to widen and deepen the ditch outside the walls to create a more effective barrier to frontal assault and mining. Engineers from the 1520s were also building massive, gently sloping banks of earth called glacis in front of ditches so that the walls were almost totally hidden from horizontal artillery fire. The main benefit of the glaces was to deny enemy artillery the ability to fire point-blank. The lower the angle of elevation, the higher the stopping power.

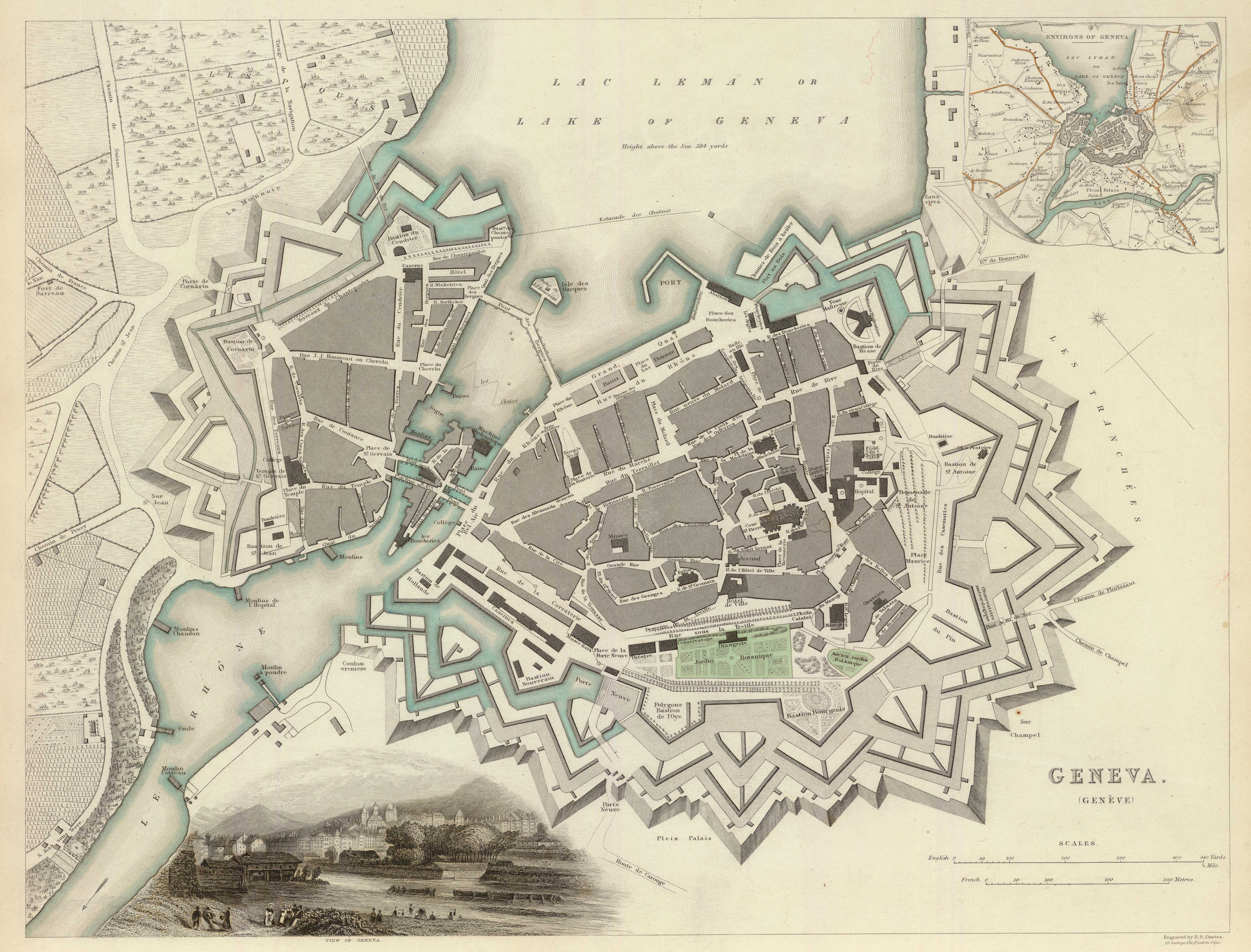
Plan of Geneva in 1841. The colossal fortifications, among the most important in Europe, were demolished ten years later.

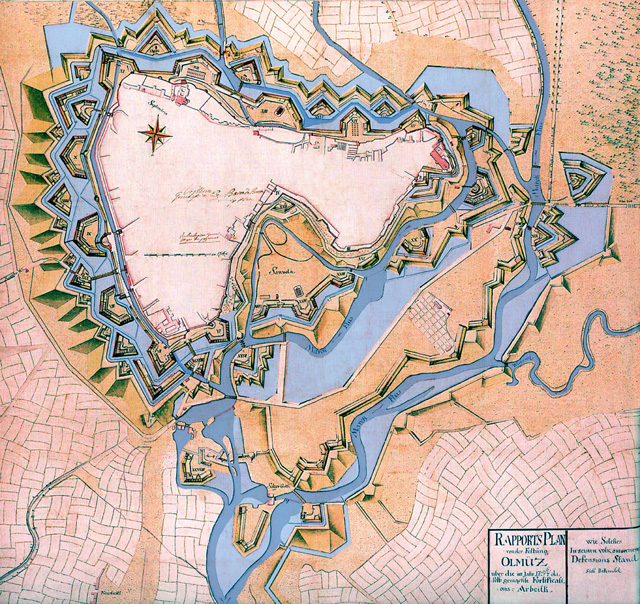
Olomouc (c. 1757) bastion fortress in Moravia (today's Czech Republic)

The first key instance of a trace Italianate was at the Papal port of Civitavecchia, where the original walls were lowered and thickened because the stone tended to shatter under bombardment.

== Effectiveness ==
The first major battle which truly showed the effectiveness of trace Italienne was the defence of Pisa in 1500 against a combined Florentine and French army. With the original medieval fortifications beginning to crumble to French cannon fire, the Pisans constructed an earthen rampart behind the threatened sector. It was discovered that the sloping earthen rampart could be defended against escalade and was also much more resistant to cannon fire than the curtain wall it had replaced.

The second siege was that of Padua in 1509. A monk engineer named Fra Giocondo, trusted with the defence of the Venetian city, cut down the city's medieval wall and surrounded the city with a broad ditch that could be swept by flanking fire from gun ports set low in projections extending into the ditch. Finding that their cannon fire made little impression on these low ramparts, the French and allied besiegers made several bloody and fruitless assaults and then withdrew.

The new type of fortification also played a role in the numerous Mediterranean wars, slowing down the Ottoman expansion. Although Rhodes had been partially upgraded to the new type of fortifications after the 1480 siege, it was still conquered in 1522; nevertheless it was a long and bloody siege, and the besieged had no hope of outside relief because the island was close to the Ottoman power base and far from any allies. On the other hand, the Ottomans failed to take Corfu in 1537 in no small part because of the new fortifications, and several attempts spanning almost two centuries (another major one was in 1716) also failed.

Two star forts were built by the Order of Saint John on the island of Malta in 1552, Fort Saint Elmo and Fort Saint Michael. Fort Saint Elmo played a critical role in the Ottoman siege of 1565 when it managed to hold out heavy bombardment for over a month. Eventually it fell, but the Ottoman casualties were very high, and it bought time for the relief force which arrived from Sicily to relieve the rest of the besieged island. The star fort therefore played a crucial and decisive role in the siege.

After the fall of Venice to Napoleon, Corfu was occupied in 1797 by the French republican armies. The now ancient fortifications were still of some value at this point. A Russian–Ottoman–English alliance led at sea by Admiral Ushakov and with troops sent by Ali Pasha retook Corfu in 1799 after a four-month siege, when the garrison led by general Louis François Jean Chabot, being short of provisions and having lost the key island of Vido at the entrance of the port, surrendered and was allowed passage back to France.

== Theories about role in the Military Revolution ==
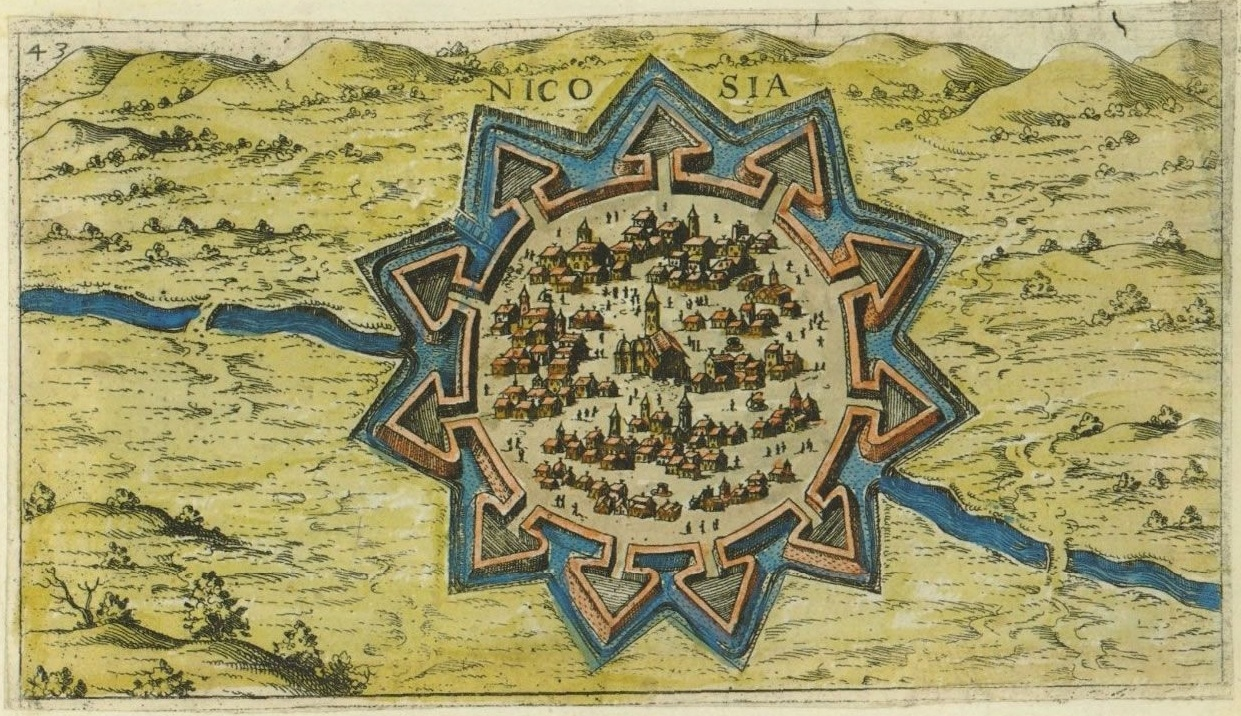
Venetian walls of Nicosia, Cyprus (1597) are a typical example of Italian Renaissance military architecture that survives to this day.

The Military Revolution thesis was originally proposed by Michael Roberts in 1955, as he focused on Sweden (1560–1660) searching for major changes in the European way of war caused by the introduction of portable firearms. Roberts linked military technology with larger historical consequences, arguing that innovations in tactics, drill and doctrine by the Dutch and Swedes (1560–1660), which maximized the utility of firearms, led to a need for more trained troops and thus for permanent forces (standing armies).

According to Geoffrey Parker in his article, The Military Revolution 1560–1660: A Myth?, the appearance of the trace Italienne in early modern Europe, and the difficulty of taking such fortifications, is what resulted in a profound change in military strategy, most importantly, Parker argued, an increase in army sizes necessary to attack these forts. "Wars became a series of protracted sieges", Parker suggests, and open-pitch battles became "irrelevant" in regions where the trace Italienne existed. Ultimately, Parker argues, "military geography", in other words, the existence or absence of the trace Italienne in a given area, shaped military strategy in the early modern period. This is a profound alteration of the Military Revolution thesis.

Parker's emphasis on the fortification as the key element has attracted substantial criticism from some academics, such as John A. Lynn and M. S. Kingra, particularly with respect to the claimed causal link between the new fortress design and increases in army sizes during this period.

== Decline ==
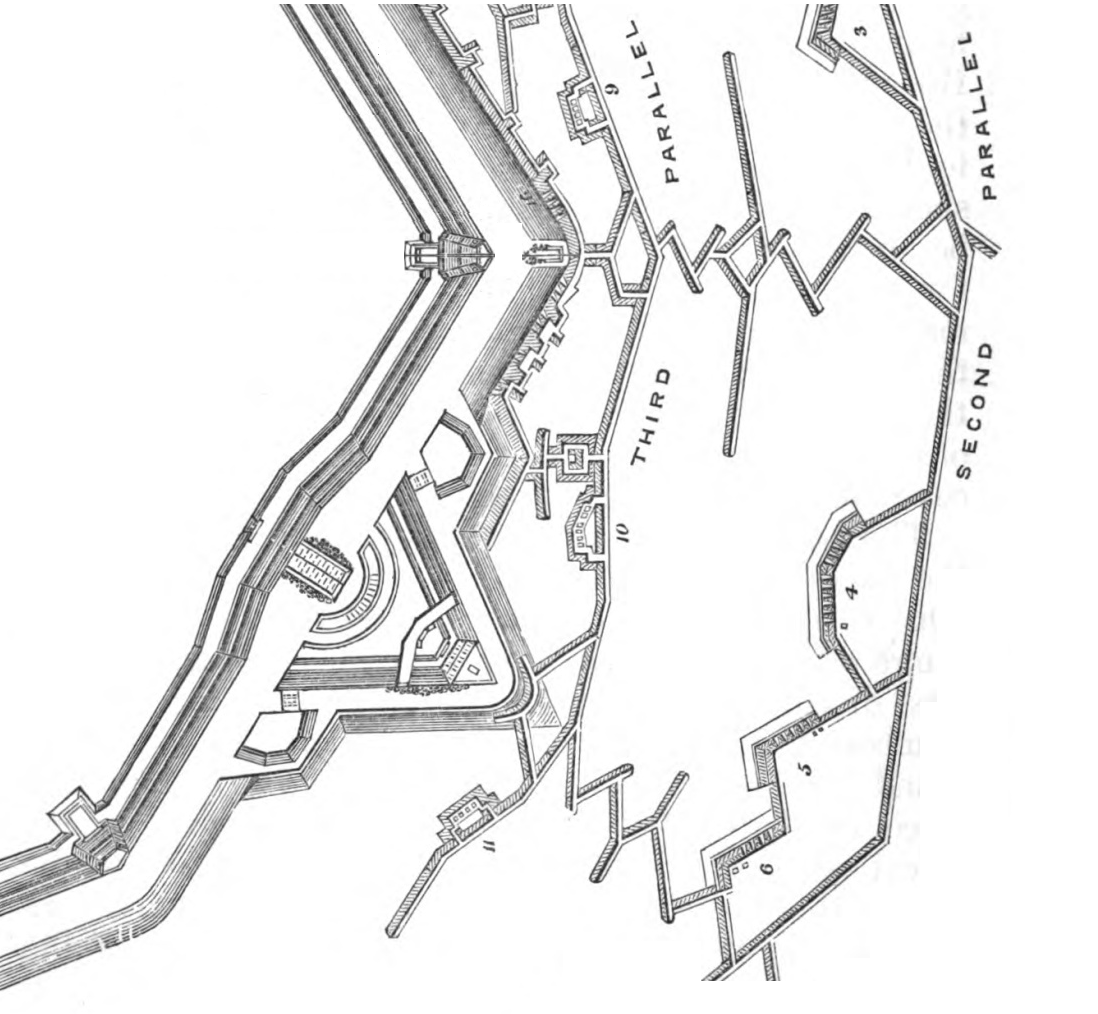
A diagram showing Vauban's method of approaching an enemy fortification using saps and parallels

The bastion system of fortification had dominated military thinking since its introduction in 16th century Italy, until the first decades of the 19th century. The French engineer Sébastien Le Prestre de Vauban also devised an effective method to defeat them. Before Vauban, besiegers had driven a sap towards the fort until they reached the glacis, where artillery could be positioned to fire directly on the scarp wall to make a breach. Vauban used saps to create three successive lines of entrenchments surrounding the fort, known as "parallels". The first two parallels reduced the vulnerability of the sapping work to a sally by the defenders, while the third parallel allowed the besiegers to launch their attack from any point along its circumference. The final refinement devised by Vauban was first used at the Siege of Ath in 1697, when he placed his artillery in the third (innermost) parallel at a point close to the bastions, from where they could ricochet their shot along the inside of the parapet, dismounting the enemy guns and killing the defenders.

In the nineteenth century, with the development of more powerful artillery and explosive shells, star forts were replaced by simpler but more robust polygonal forts. In the twentieth century, with the development of tanks and aerial warfare during and after the First World War, fixed fortifications diminished and have remained less important than in previous centuries.

Star forts reappeared during the early twenty-first-century French intervention in Mali where they were built by the 17th Parachute Engineer Regiment.

== Gallery ==
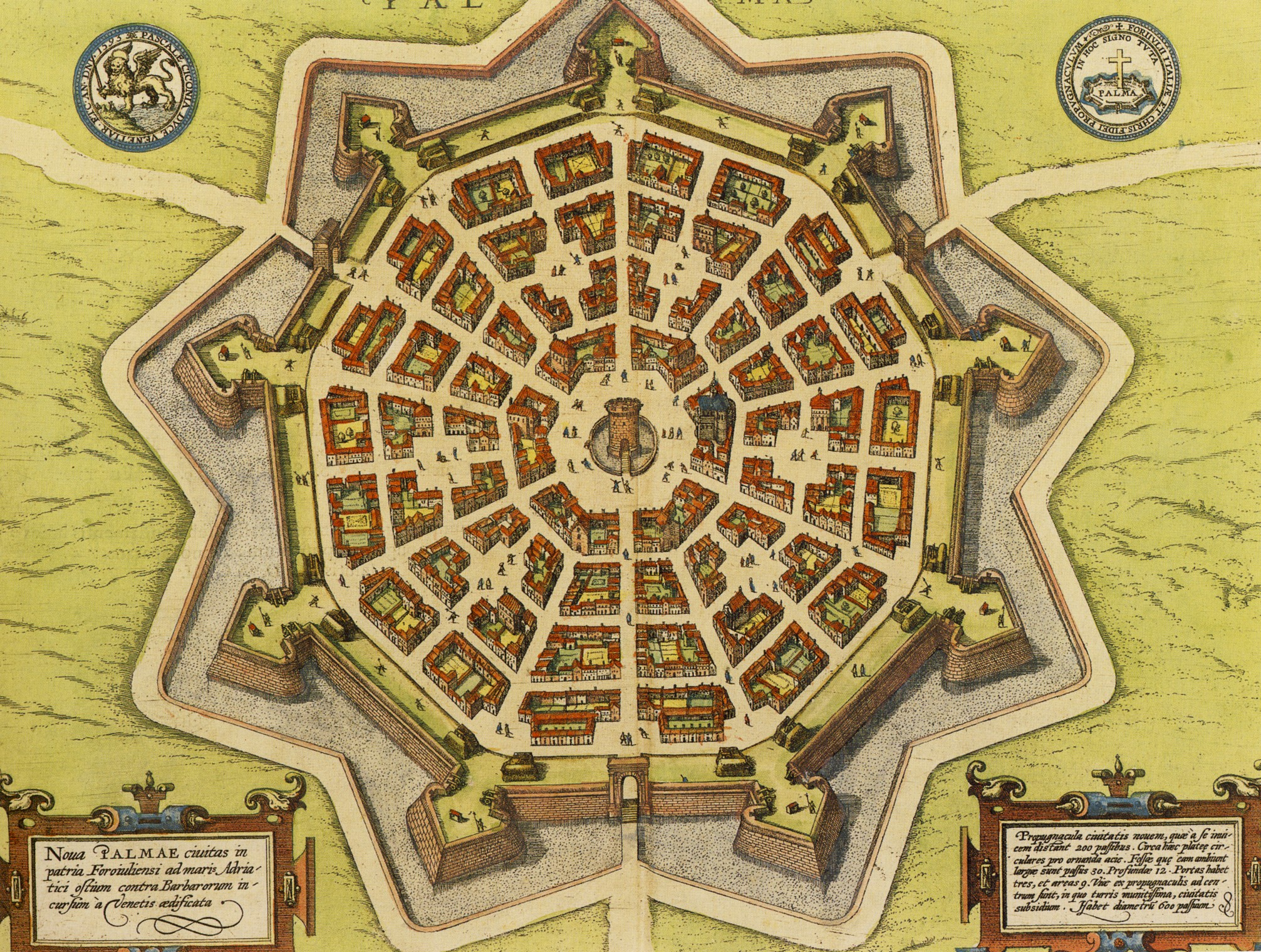
Map of Palmanova in 1593. The town is encircled by massive Venetian Defensive Systems that are a UNESCO World Heritage Site.

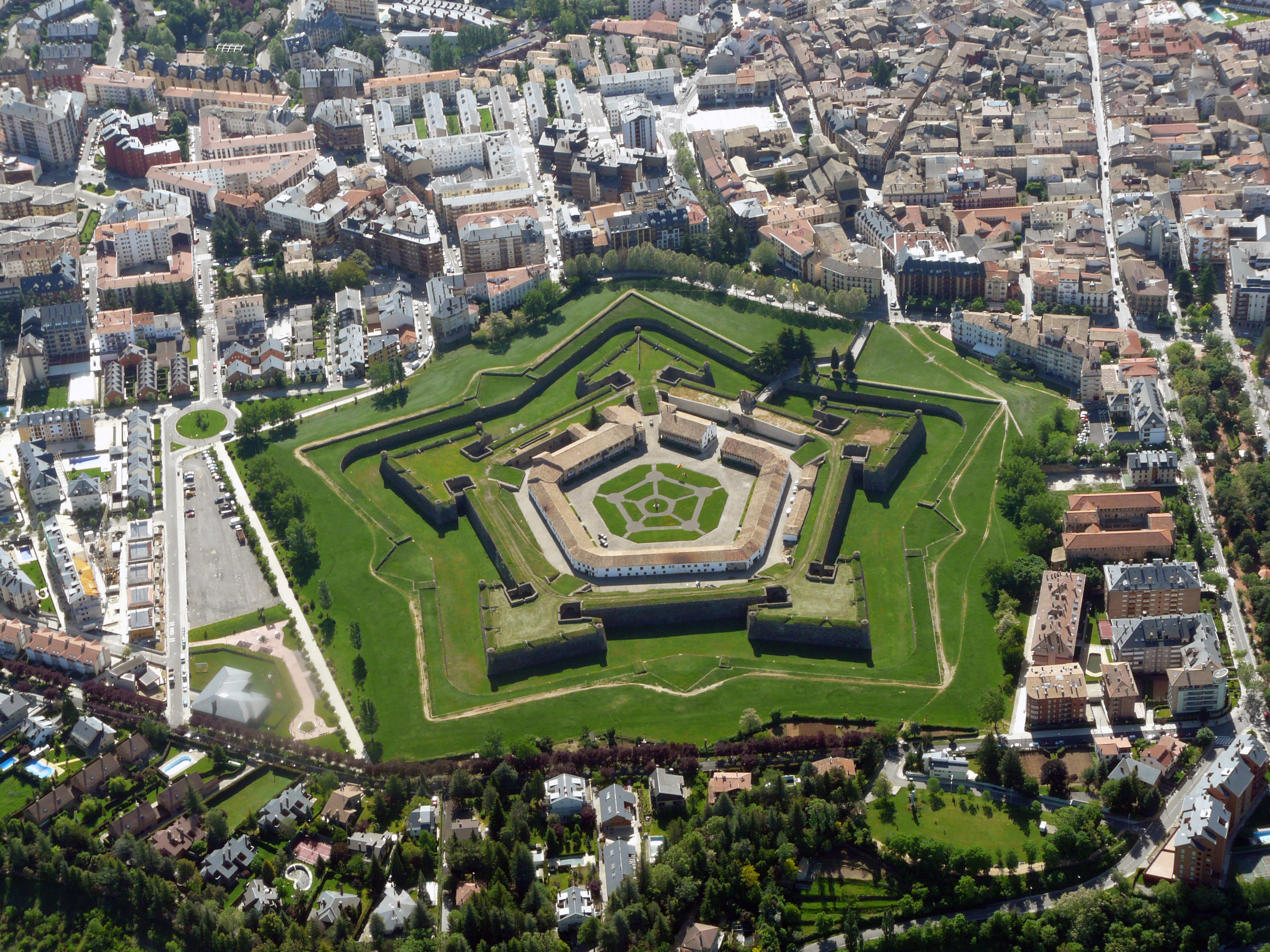
Citadel of Jaca, Spain, an example of a bastion fort

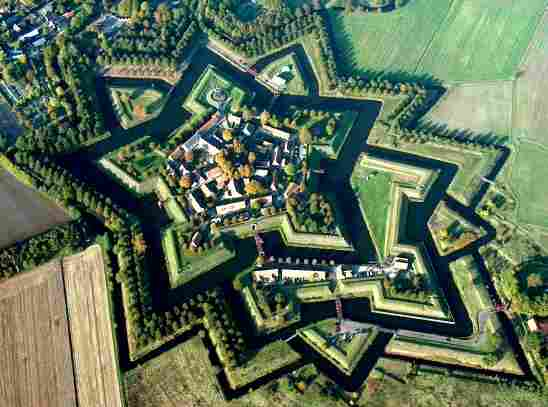
Bourtange fortification, restored to its 1742 condition, Groningen, Netherlands

== See also ==
- Fort Jay
- Battlement
- Erik Dahlberg
- List of established military terms
- List of bastion forts
- Mathematics and architecture
- Menno van Coehoorn
- Sébastien Le Prestre de Vauban
  - Fortifications of Vauban
- Suomenlinna
- Venetian Works of Defence between the 16th and 17th centuries: Stato da Terra – Western Stato da Mar
- Bastioned Wall of Tours
