= Bastioned wall of Tours =

French rampart

bastioned enclosure of Tours
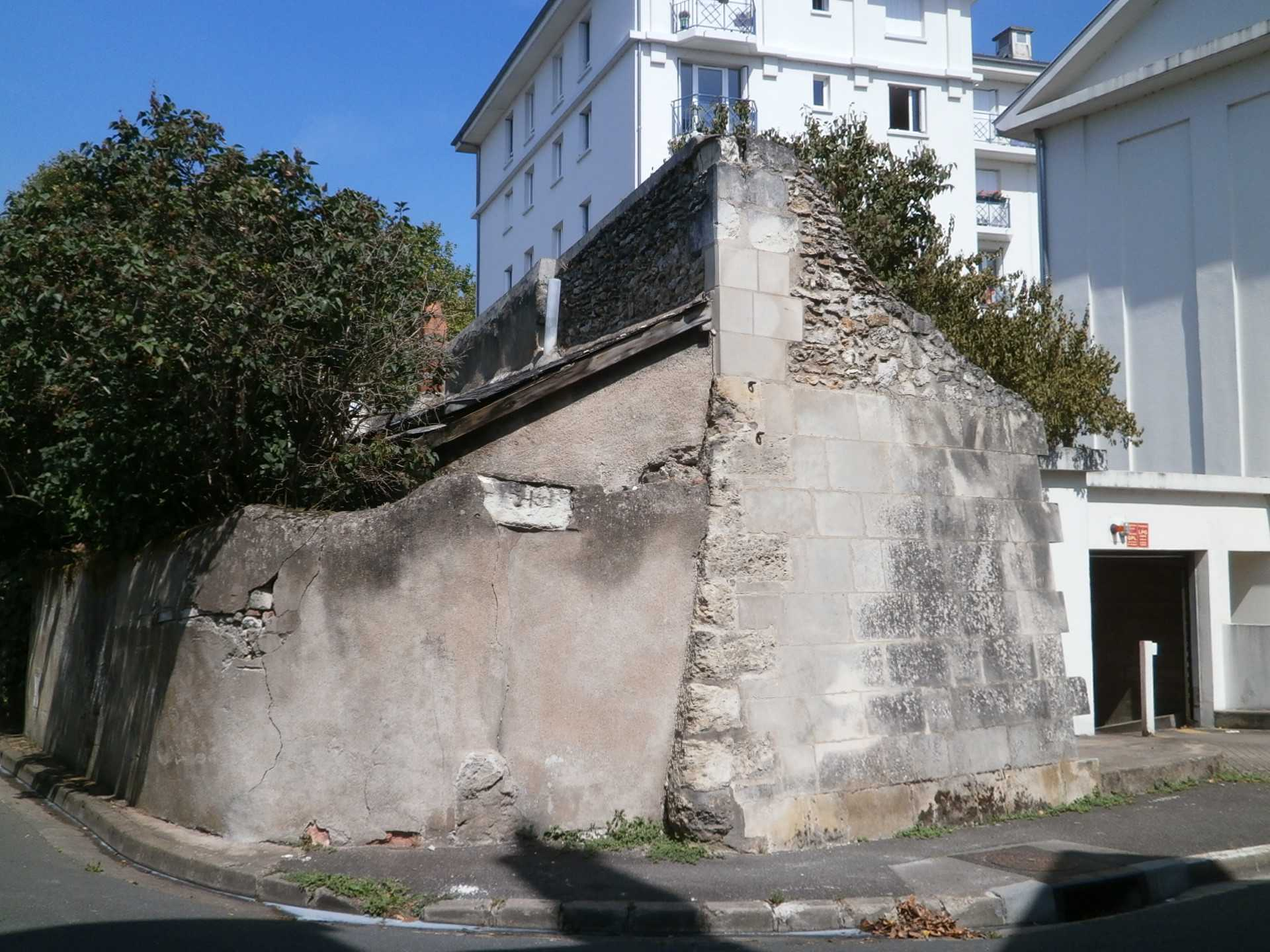
- Remains of the city walls (bastion of Saint-Éloi).
- Interactive map of bastioned enclosure of Tours
- Location: Tours, Indre-et-Loire; France
- Coordinates: 47°23′23″N 0°41′21″E
- Designer: Jacques II Androuet du Cerceau
- Type: Urban defensive enclosure
- Beginning date: 1591
- Completion date: 1685

The bastioned wall of Tours was a rampart constructed between 1591 and 1685 around the modern city of Tours.

The project originated in the early 16th century under the reign of Francis I, in response to the city's expansion beyond its medieval walls. It was formalized during the Wars of Religion, when Henry III took refuge in Tours for security reasons. Construction began with the approval of Henry IV but progressed slowly over nearly a century. The final structure was less extensive than originally planned, due to financial constraints. In the 18th and 19th centuries, the enclosure was breached in several locations to accommodate urban developments, including the construction of roads, a canal, and a railway station. These modifications contributed to the city's vulnerability to flooding by the Loire River in the mid-19th century. The rampart, having lost its military and hydraulic functions, was gradually neglected and fell into disuse.

The enclosure was gradually dismantled or incorporated into new structures, with only a few remnants surviving, primarily in its western section. Its layout continues to influence the urban landscape, notably along the southern flank, where Boulevards Bérangerand Heurteloup were constructed on terraces adjacent to the former wall. The bastioned rampart of Tours was included in the General inventory of cultural heritage in 1991.

== Geographical and historical context ==
=== Aborted projects ===
In 1476, approximately a century after the clouaison was built under John the Good, discussions began regarding the expansion of the city. In 1478, Louis XI initiated a project to reclaim land from the south bank of the Loire River to an island midstream, aiming to redirect the river northward. The plan was abandoned in 1481 due to its impractical scale and persistent adverse weather conditions.

Around 1520, Francis I and his Superintendent of Finances, Jacques de Beaune, proposed expanding Tours by draining the marshy varenne south of John the Good's wall and constructing a new enclosure. (Note: Chevalier 1985, p. 146) Despite the city's prosperity, financial constraints limited the project, and only minor works were completed at the eastern and western ends of the city. (Note: Giraudet 1873, p. 65, vol. II)

=== Origins ===
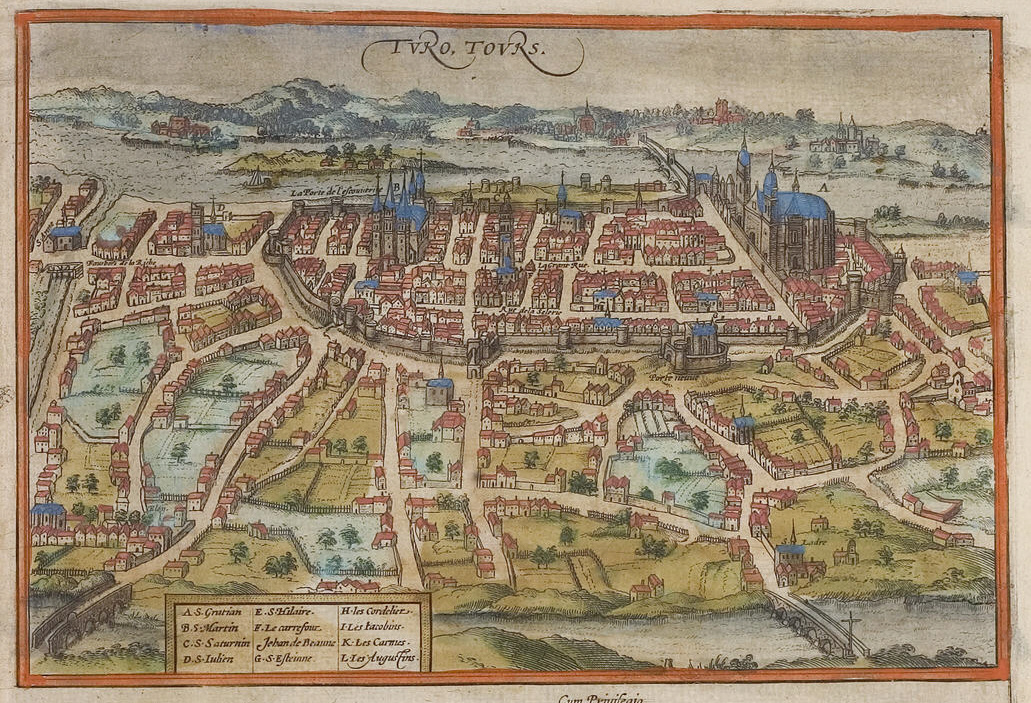
Oblique projection of Tours and the clouaison (Georg Braun and Frans Hogenberg, 1572).

In the late 16th century, during the Wars of Religion, Henry III sought refuge in Tours, prompting Jean VI d'Aumont to propose a new defensive wall. (Note: Chevalier 1985, p. 176) By this time, Tours had expanded beyond its 14th-century wall, particularly westward, as depicted in a 1572 bird's-eye view. A new enclosure was planned to protect the city from the ruau Sainte-Anne in the west to Saint-Pierre-des-Corps in the east. Jacques Androuet du Cerceau designed the final plan after an earlier proposal (Note: Chevalier 1985, pp. 175–176) by Gilles de Courtenvaux de Souvré, governor of Touraine, was deemed inadequate; the eastern bastion was named after Souvré. The plan was authorized by Henry IV through letters patent in April 1591. (Note: Galinié 2007, p. 315) (Note: Dubant 2006, p. 224)

The city's economic condition, weakened by debt, hindered the rapid construction of the new wall compared to earlier in the century. Despite this, the king committed to funding "14 écus and 40 sols per toise of wall," provided the mayor and aldermen of Tours contributed matching funds from octroi collections. (Note: Giraudet 1873, p. 67, vol. II) With the Wars of Religion less pressing, the urgency for the project decreased. (Note: Chevalier 1985, p. 185)

=== Construction over time ===
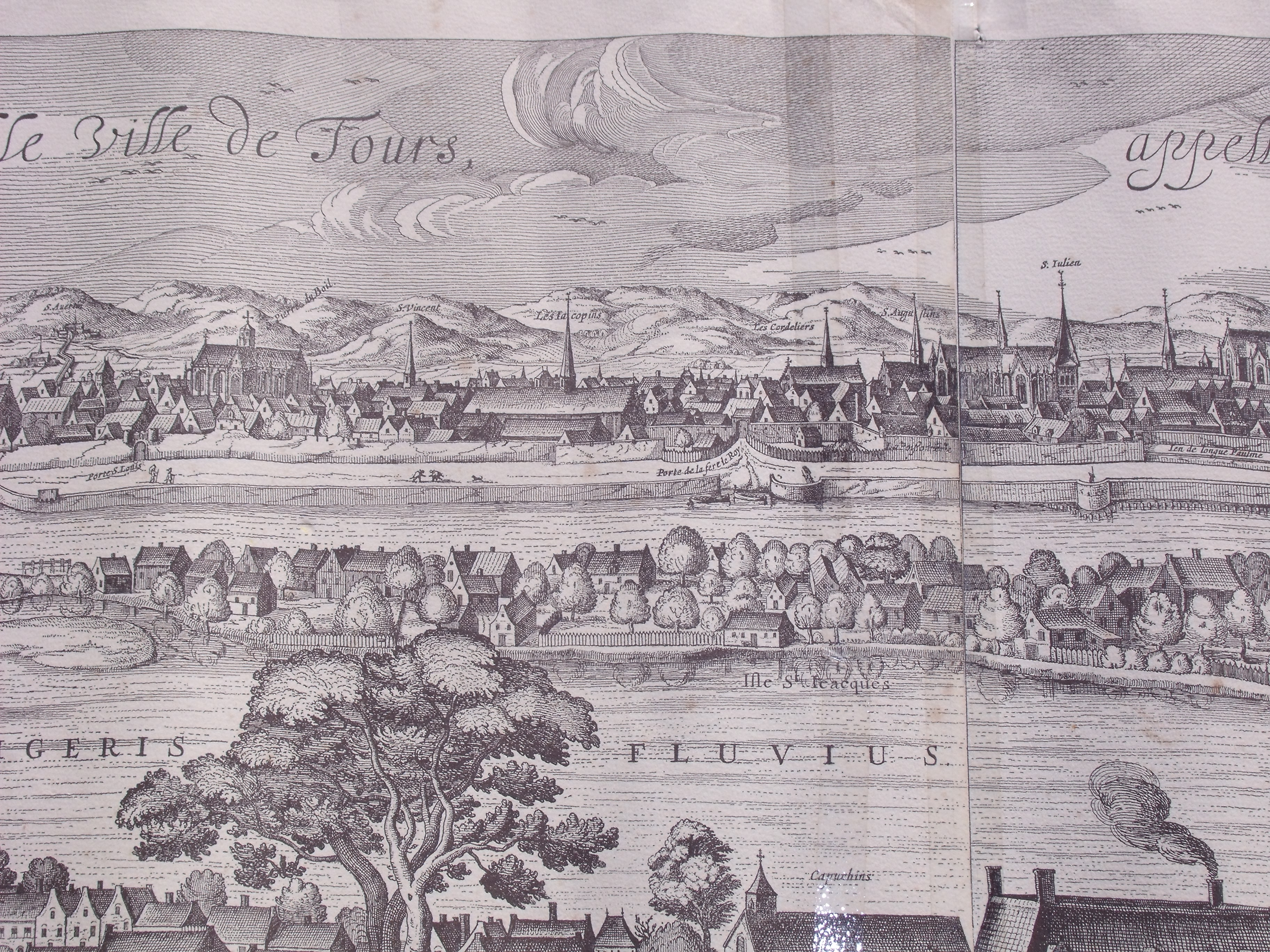
View of the Loire riverfront in Tours, including elements of the bastioned rampart.

In 1599, the city council scaled back the project, adopting a less extensive plan, particularly reducing the western perimeter of the wall. (Note: Dubant 2006, p. 225) Construction, overseen by Jacques Androuet du Cerceau and French-naturalized engineer Richard Barthélemy, progressed slowly. Significant work on the enclosure began in 1616 and was completed in 1685, with interruptions, including one ordered by Louis XIII between 1626 and 1635. (Note: Dubant 2006, pp. 227–228) Priority was given to digging southern moats and reinforcing the Loire-facing section to protect against flooding. The city allocated construction contracts through public bidding, dividing the work into sections.

During the construction of the enclosure, the city's militia system was reorganized. In 1663, thirteen guard companies were established, with four assigned to protect the rampart's main gates and the others deployed around the old wall or beyond the city limits.

== A wall far exceeding the urbanized area ==
The new wall, spanning 6 km, doubled the city's area to 168 hectares, including bastions, and enclosed extensive gardens to the south and east for future urban expansion, while part of the La Riche suburb to the west remained outside. (Note: Dubant 2006, p. 228) Like Jean le Bon's clouaison, it extended west to east along the Loire River, with its southern boundary aligning with the modern Heurteloup and Béranger boulevards, connecting to the Loire via present-day rue Léon-Boyer in the west (Note: Livernet 1982, p. 356) and avenue Georges-Pompidou in the east. After 1788, a Protestant cemetery, previously located at the Bastion des Oiseaux, was relocated outside the walls, as noted on Eugène Giraudet's 1873 map of Tours. Despite a reduced perimeter following plan revisions, full urbanization of the enclosed area occurred only in the 19th century, with the southeast neighborhoods developed last. (Note: Chevalier 1985, p. 259)

=== A defined defensive purpose ===
==== Curtain wall ====
The wall, approximately 8 meters tall up to a molded string course, features a parapet with casemates and embrasures, reaching a total height of nearly 10 meters. Plans for multiple bastions along the southern flank, as shown in René Siette's 1619 map, (Note: Galinié 2007, p. 316) were abandoned during construction. Instead of bastions, simple turrets were integrated into the curtain wall, as depicted in a wash painting from the 1680s. (Note: Dubant 2006, p. 229)

An excavation in 1991 at Place du Général-Leclerc revealed that the retaining wall of a bastion defending the Saint-Étienne gate is supported by piles driven into the ground or a platform of beams. The wall, constructed with two faces of medium-sized yellow tuffeau stone blocks from Saint-Avertin, has a rubble masonry core of tuffeau blocks, with a total thickness of 2.4 meters at ground level. The outer face features a pronounced batter. Since construction, the ground level has risen by approximately 4 meters.

==== Gates and ditch ====
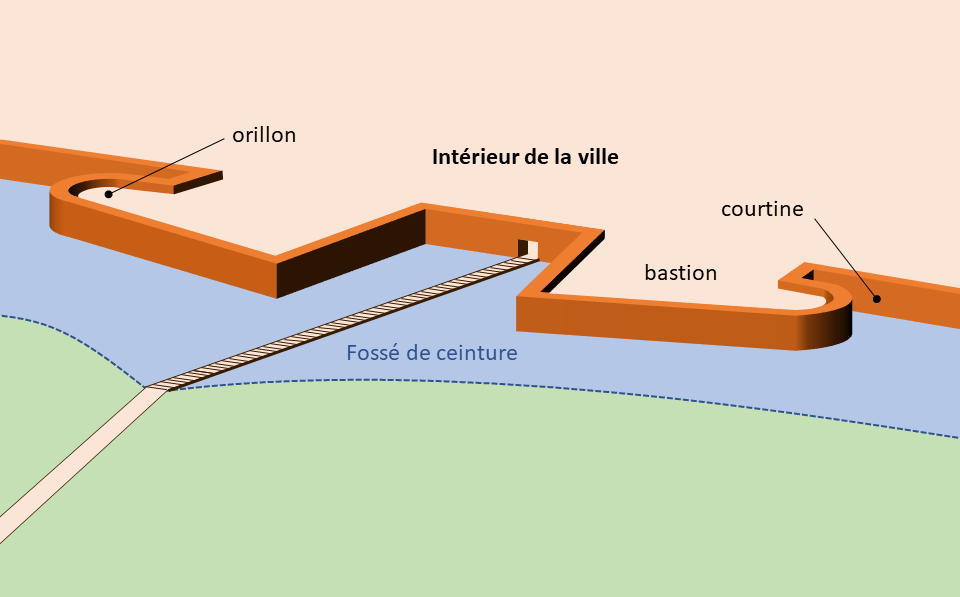
Schematic representation of the Saint-Étienne gate.

The bastioned wall originally featured four main gates—Sainte-Anne (or des Oiseaux) in the west, Saint-Éloi at the southwest corner, Saint-Étienne near the train station, and Henri de Bourbon on the eastern side along the Loire (Note: According to the texts and published plans, the name "Henri de Bourbon Gate" is assigned either to the gate located at the former landing stage or to the one opening on the eastern façade of the rampart. As for the Saint-Étienne Gate, it is sometimes referred to as "New Saint-Étienne Gate" to distinguish it from the old gate opened in the 14th-century wall. (Note: Livernet 1982, p. 182) In this article, the publications of Didier Dubant, the most recent, are used as the reference: the gate at the landing stage is named “Saint-Étienne Gate” and the one on the eastern façade is called “Henri de Bourbon Gate.” (Note: Dubant 2006, p. 226))—each defended by bastions with orillons. Their locations were aligned with the existing road network. (Note: Livernet 1982, p. 197) Additional gates and posterns were situated along the Loire-facing side.

A dry ditch, serving as the first line of defense, surrounded the bastioned wall's perimeter, except along the Loire River. Earth excavated from the ditch was used to elevate the ground level within the bastions. Between the Bourbon and Saint-Éloi gates, the Dolve stream, also known as the "encircling stream" (names recorded after the wall's construction), was incorporated into the ditch. This stream helped drain moisture from the marshy area containing oxbow lakes and channeled some of the city's sewage. From the mid-19th century, the heavily silted stream, with stagnant water causing local complaints, was filled in or culverted along its entire length.

=== Functional structures to the North and decorative features to the South ===
==== Dikes and landing stage on the Loire ====
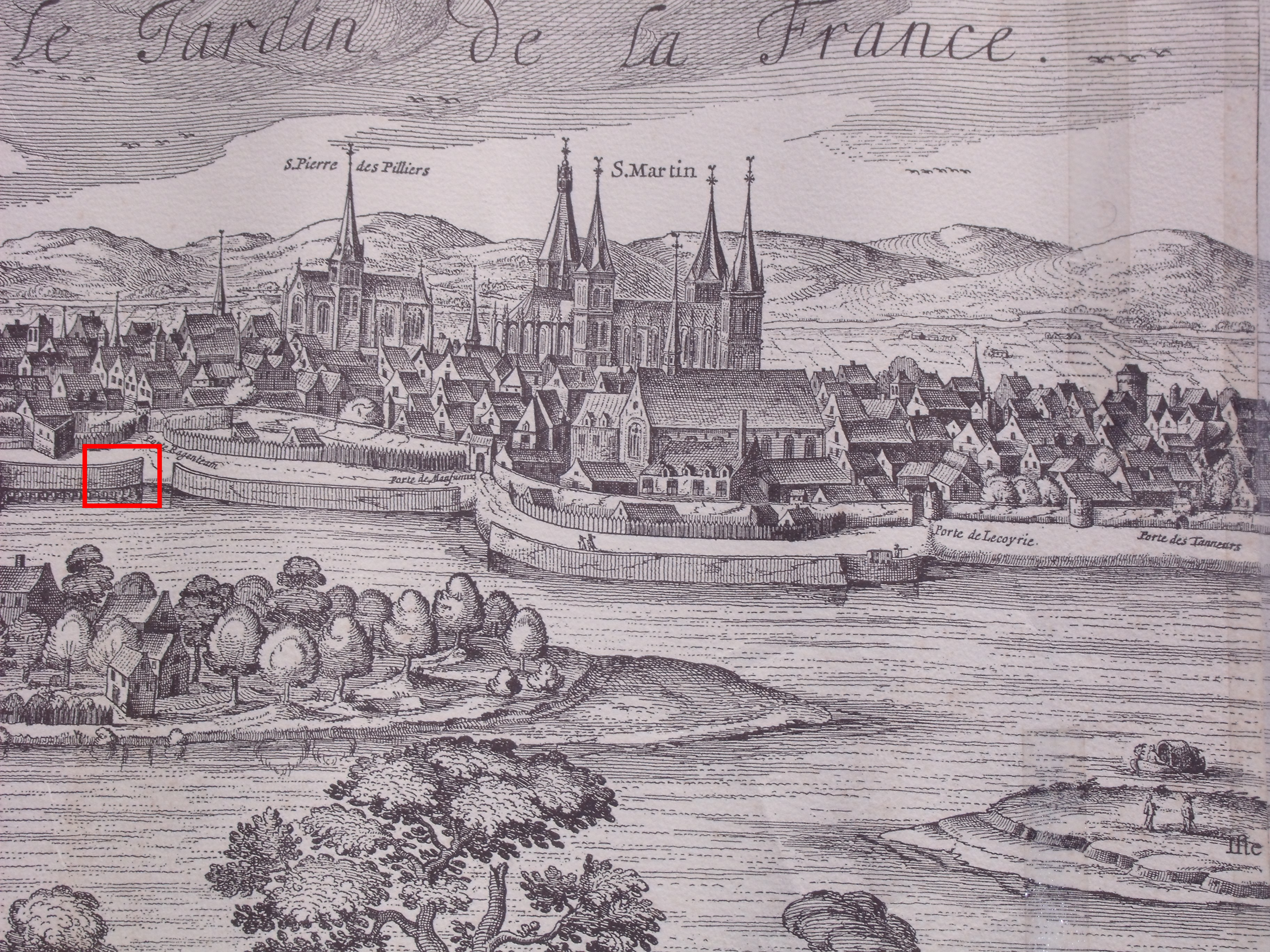
Fig. 1: The Ragueneau door, on the left in Visscher's engraving.

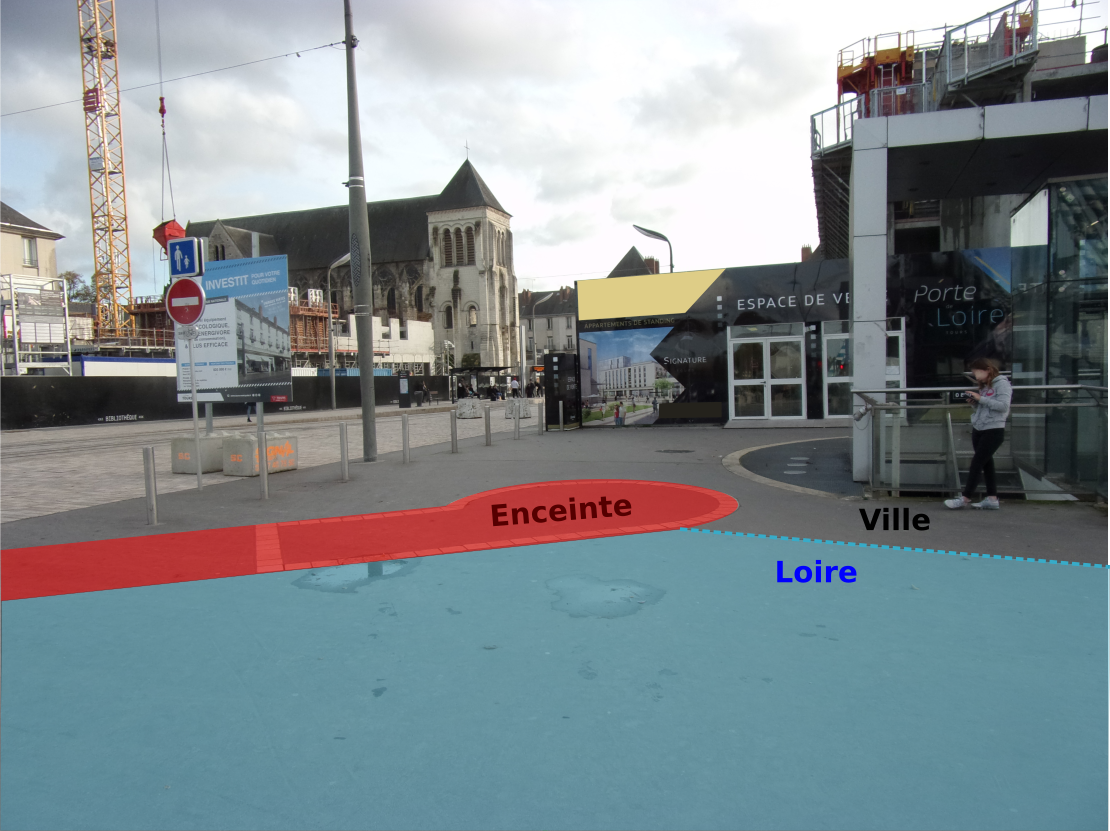
Fig. 2: Schematic representation of the landing stage on Rue Ragueneau.

The red frame in Fig. 1 corresponds to the area photographed in Fig. 2.

The wall along the Loire River extends the left bank approximately 15 meters northward, continuing efforts to reclaim land from the river since the city's founding. It incorporated the clouaison of Jean le Bon, whose remnants were later leveled and buried under fill supporting the new wall between the medieval bridge and the northwestern corner. Posterns on the north side were designed to mitigate flooding. A landing stage at the northern end of rue Raguenau was framed by two recessed segments of the curtain wall, (Note: Galinié 2007, p. 216) visible in Claes Jansz Visscher’s 1625 engraving, and supported by oak piles driven into the ground, creating a 31-meter-wide opening. (Note: Galinié 2007, p. 217) In 1692, a triumphal arch honoring Louis XVI (Note: Giraudet 1873, p. 150, vol. II) was built along the Loire front but was dismantled in 1755 to facilitate the construction of rue Nationale and the Wilson Bridge. (Note: Giraudet 1873, p. 151, vol. II)

==== Tree-lined promenade along the ramparts ====
In 1603, a promenade lined with two double rows of elm trees, some transplanted from other parts of Tours, (Note: Dubant 2006, p. 230) was established along the southern curtain wall, forming the basis for the future boulevards Heurteloup (east of the train station, known as Petit Mail) and Béranger (including the western section of boulevard Heurteloup, known as Grand Mail). This promenade became a popular Sunday destination for residents. The elm trees were periodically replanted, though in 1793, those in the Petit Mail were cut down to supply timber for the National Navy.

== A wall of questionable usefulness ==
=== A defensive role quickly abandoned ===
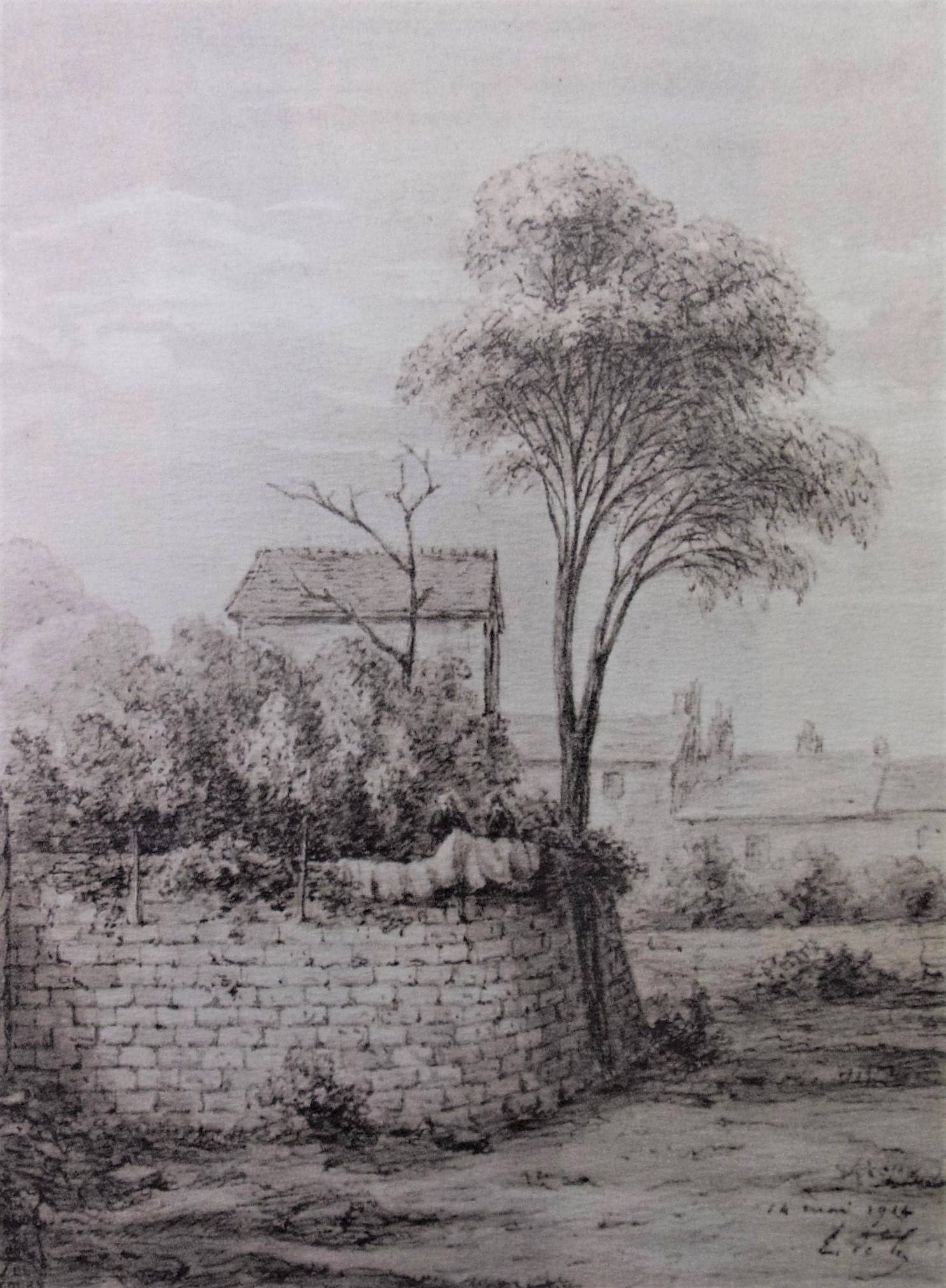
Remains of the Souvré bastion (1912).

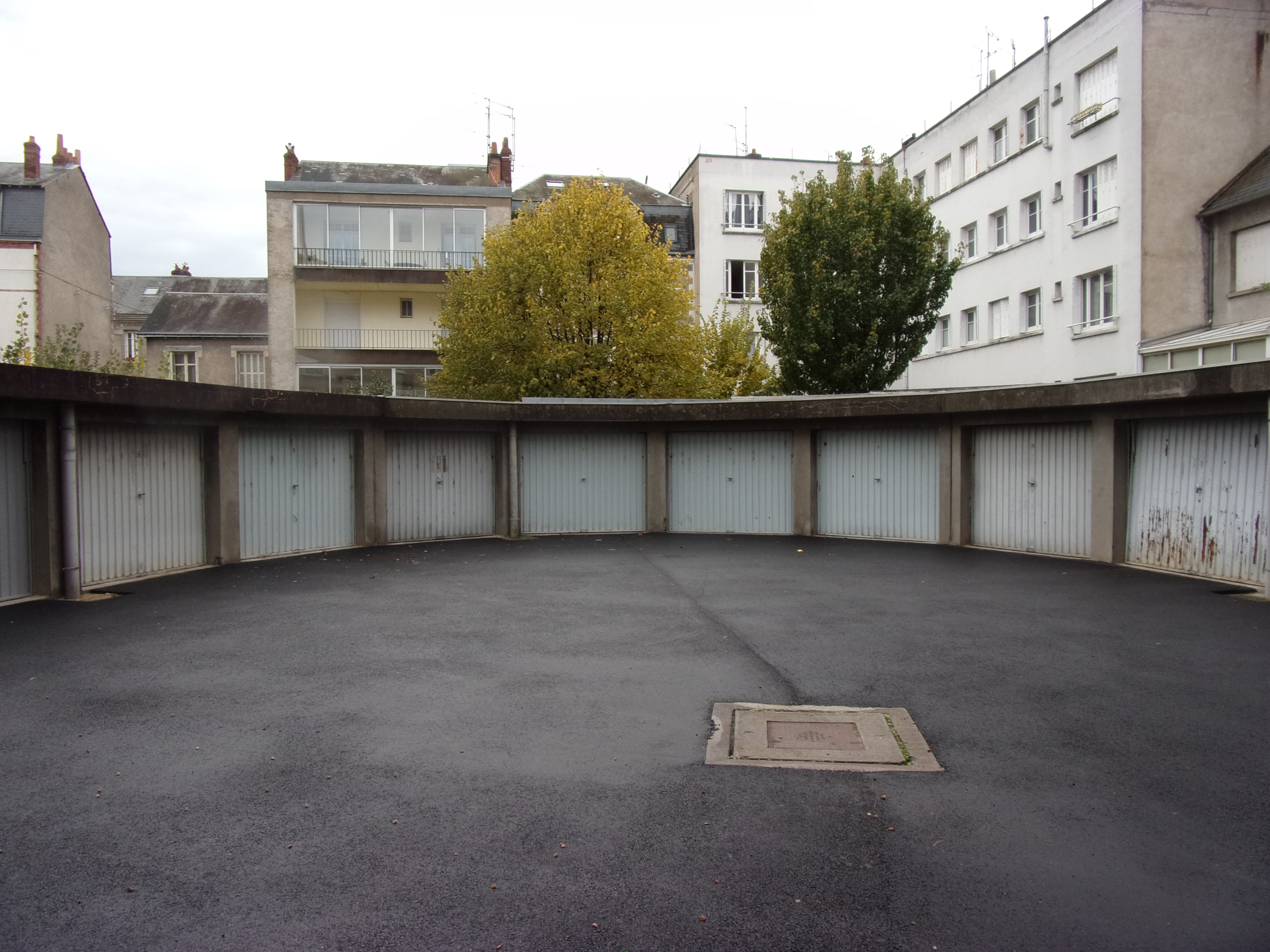
Garages built on the site of a bastion of the Souvré bastion (2019).

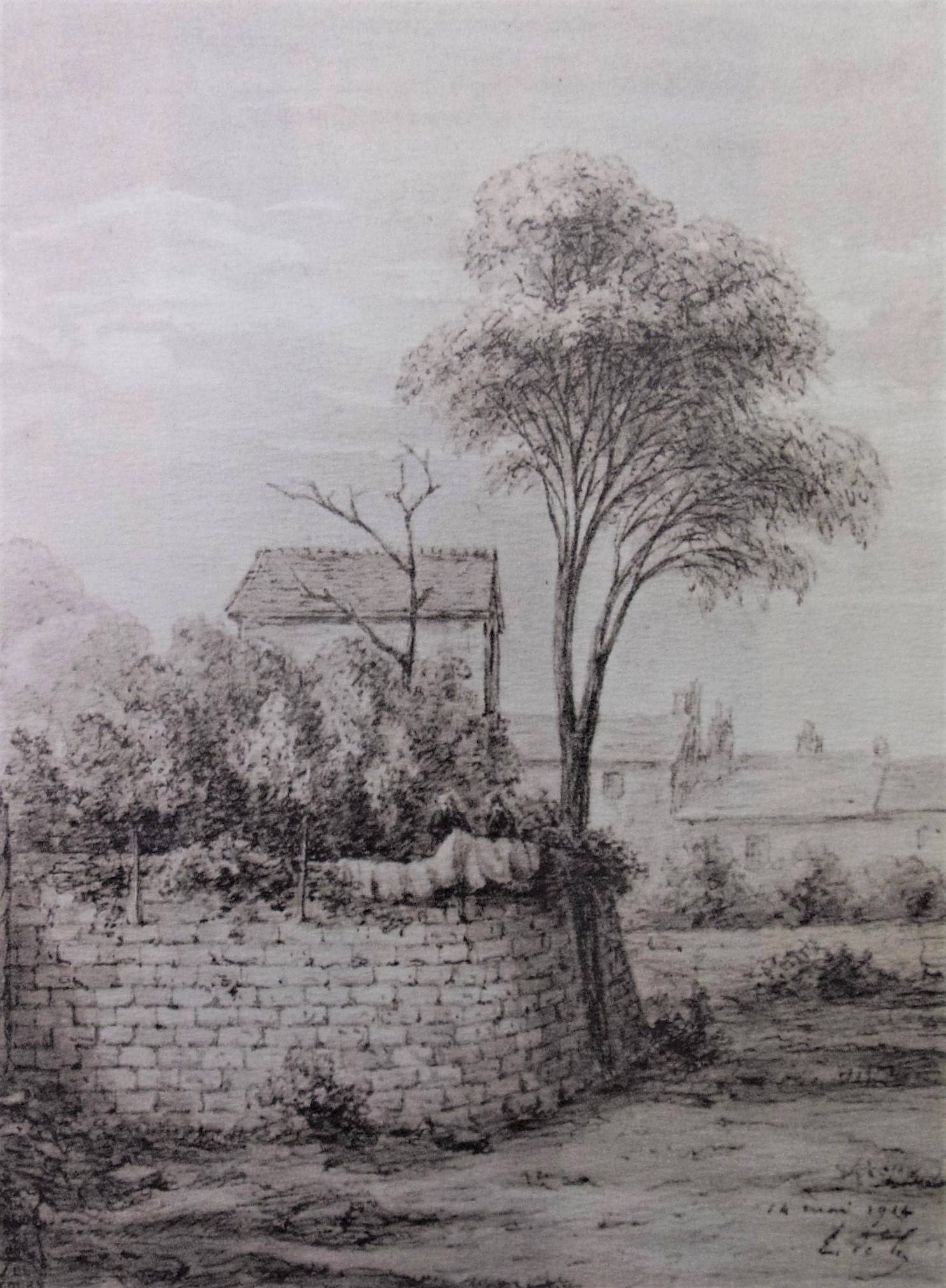
Remains of the Souvré bastion (1912).

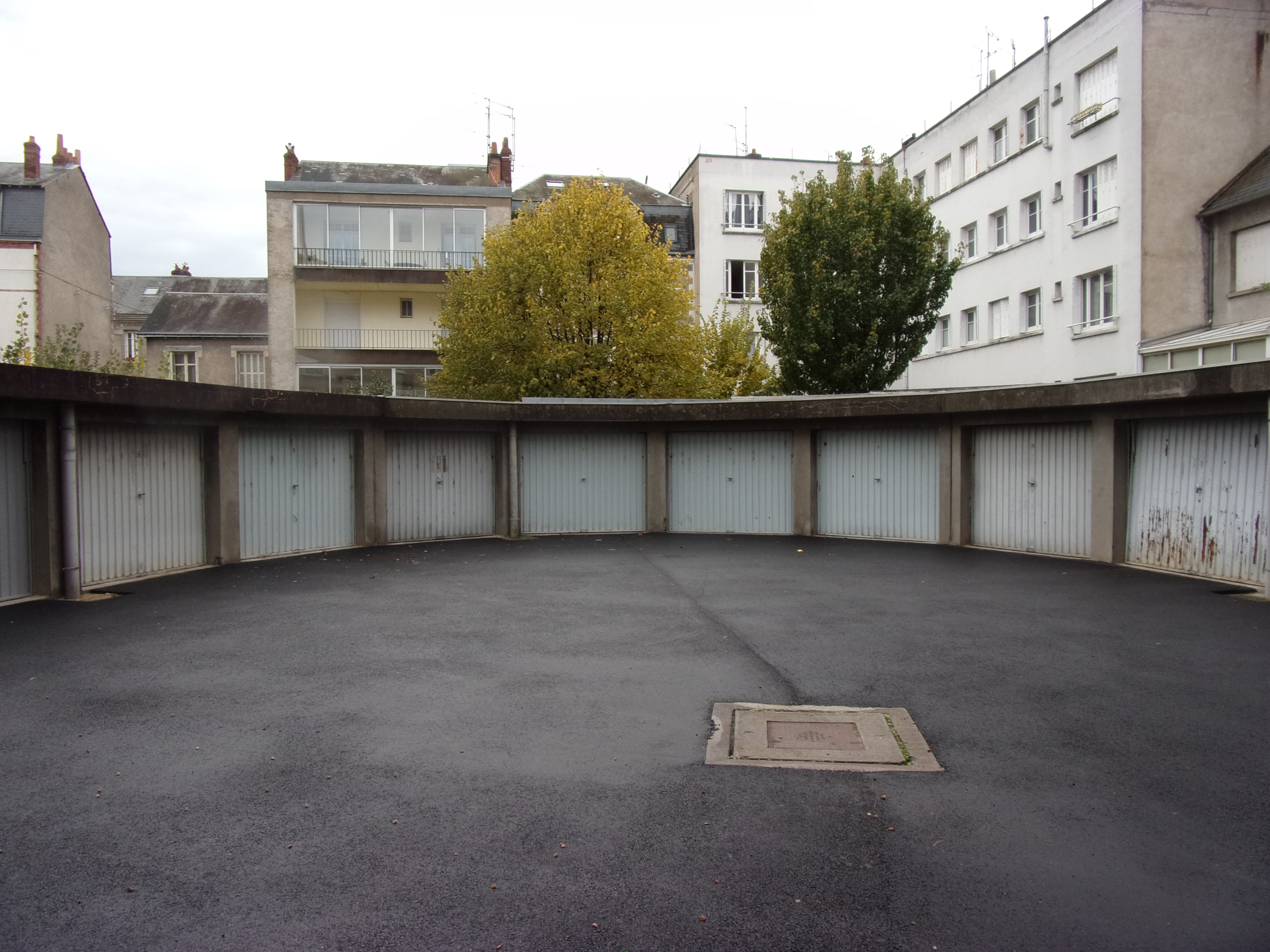
Garages built on the site of a bastion of the Souvré bastion (2019).

The bastioned wall, completed in the late 17th century, proved militarily obsolete due to improved security conditions, facing no significant threats. By 1604, mulberry trees were planted within a bastion, and by 1722, bastions (Note: In the 17th and 18th centuries, the textile industry, particularly silk, was the main economic activity in Tours. (Note: Chevalier 1985, p. 199)) and ditches were used for gardens or pastures, indicating a loss of defensive purpose. In 1724, Louis XV ordered the curtain wall's height reduced. Between 1754 and 1758, the Saint-Étienne gate was closed using reused masonry, though its bastions remained until the train station's construction. The opening of the chaussée de Grammont (now avenue de Grammont) and a new passage at Place Jean-Jaurès in 1751, followed by the development of avenue de la Tranchée (1764), the Wilson Bridge (1765–1778), and rue Du Cluzel (later rue Nationale, 1775–1786), formed a major north-south road axis, likely planned by Daniel-Charles Trudaine around 1747 to establish a new route to Spain via Tours.

By the mid-18th century, the city no longer viewed the wall as a defensive structure, repairing the curtain wall only when its deterioration threatened public amenities and demolishing sections considered too costly to maintain. Private landowners similarly dismantled parts on their properties, with municipal authorities readily approving such actions. (Note: Livernet 1982, p. 185)

=== Insufficiently effective flood protection ===
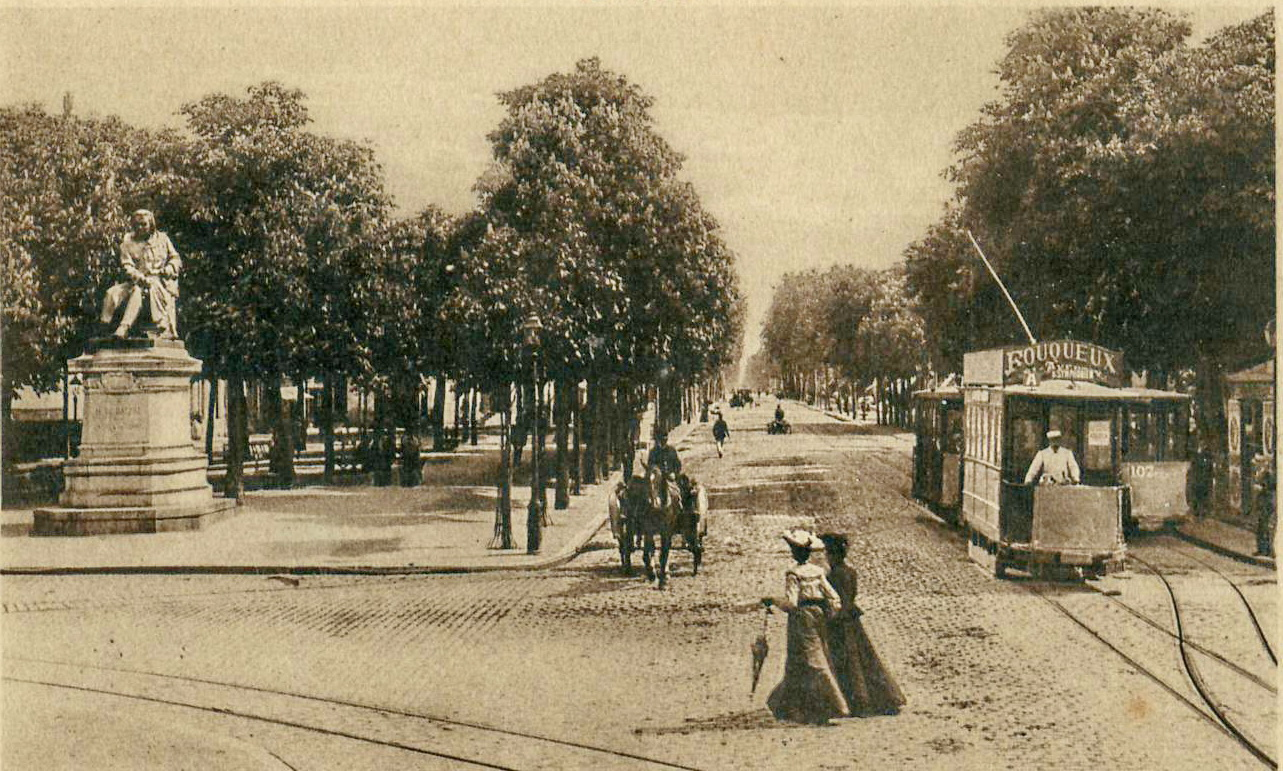
View of the entrance to Avenue de Grammont, towards the site of the Iron Gates. (Note: The Portes de fer (Iron Gates) blocked the avenue de Grammont roughly at the level of the tram line visible in the background.)

Flooded areas of the walled city of Tours during the flood of 1856.

The bastioned wall was initially intended to protect Tours from Loire River flooding, but its effectiveness was compromised by significant breaches. Between 1775 and 1786, the construction of Rue Nationale created two large gates on the north and south sides. To mitigate flood risks, the southern passageway at Place des Portes de fer (now Place Jean-Jaurès) was raised into a humpback shape using rampart debris, though it was obstructed by octroi gates. (Note: In 1846, the annexation of the commune of Saint-Étienne-Extra by Tours led to the relocation of the octroi (tax gate) nearly two kilometers further south along avenue de Grammont and the dismantling of the Portes de fer.) The Loire-to-Cher canal, constructed between 1824 and 1828, demolished the eastern section of the rampart, including the Henri de Bourbon gate, with its masonry repurposed for the canal levee. The construction of the first railway station in 1845 further demolished parts of the curtain wall near the former Saint-Étienne gate. These breaches left Tours vulnerable to flooding from the alluvial plain between the Loire and Cher rivers, exacerbating damage during the major floods of 1846 and 1856. (Note: On June 3, 1856, the Loire embankment gave way near Montlouis-sur-Loire, upstream from Tours. Water flooded the varenne between the Loire and the Cher. It entered Tours through the breaches in the rampart at the level of the landing stage to the south and through the canal, whose dike had also given way to the east. The Cher, which was also in flood, increased the severity of the inundation. The entire southern half of the city was flooded, with local water levels reaching up to 3 meters. This flood was the most severe ever recorded for the city of Tours. (Note: Chevalier 1985, p. 287)) The remaining wall hindered the rapid drainage of accumulated floodwater, worsening the impact.

=== Disappearance in the mid-19th century ===
By the mid-19th century, the rampart remained largely intact, but its condition deteriorated rapidly thereafter. (Note: Chevalier 1985, p. 285) In 1861, the crumbling and vegetation-covered curtain wall was reduced to approximately 2.5 meters in height along its entire length, and the tree-lined promenades (mails) were transformed into boulevards. Demolition materials were used to backfill the land at the rampart's base. (Note: Livernet 1982, p. 347) The Dolve stream was eliminated, and the humpback rise at Place des Portes de fer was leveled to accommodate tram tracks introduced in 1877.

Representations of the bastioned enclosure on plans of Tours.

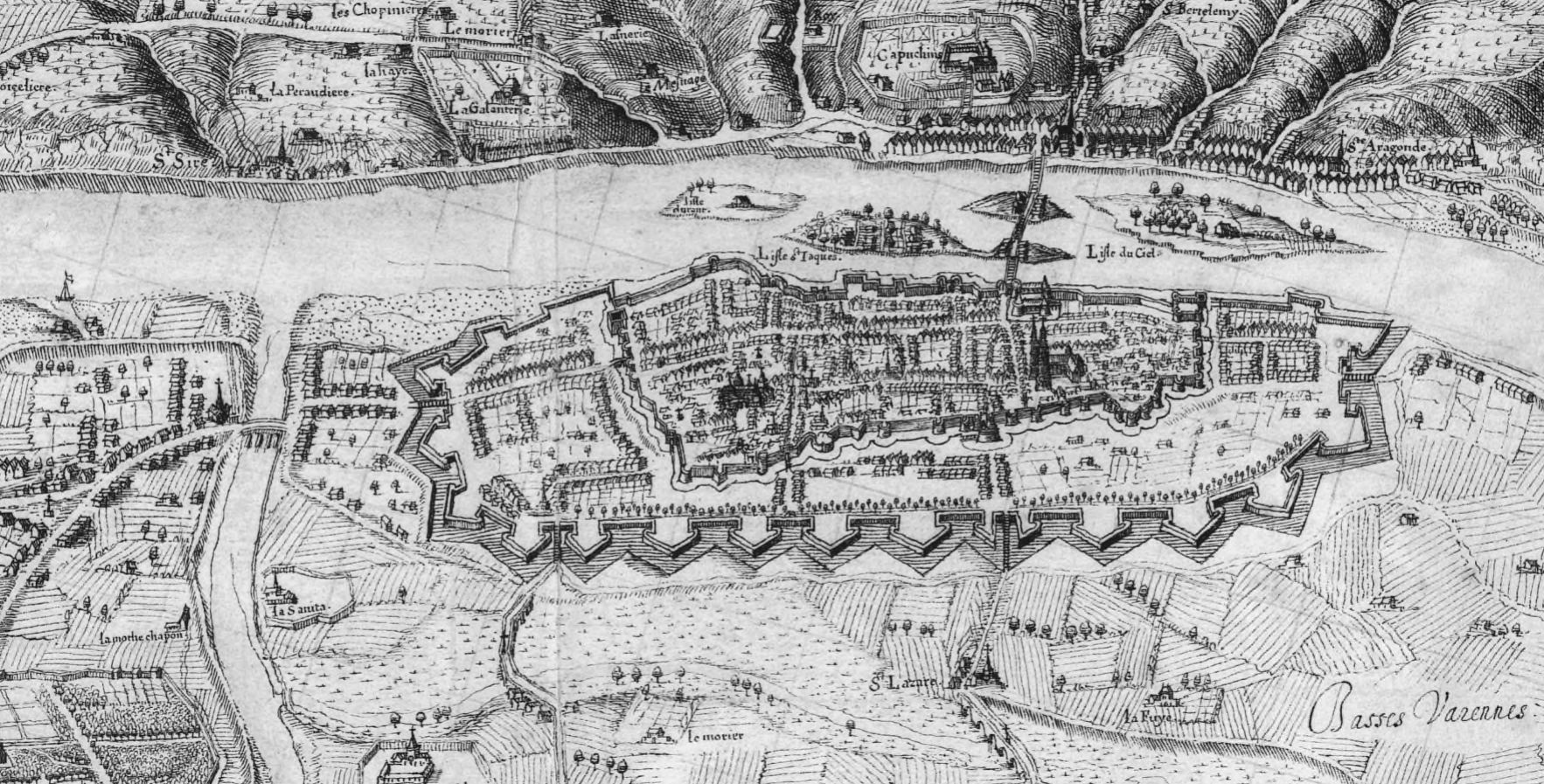
Excerpt from René Siette's map from 1619: initial plan of the walls in their revised version from 1599 with all the bastions.

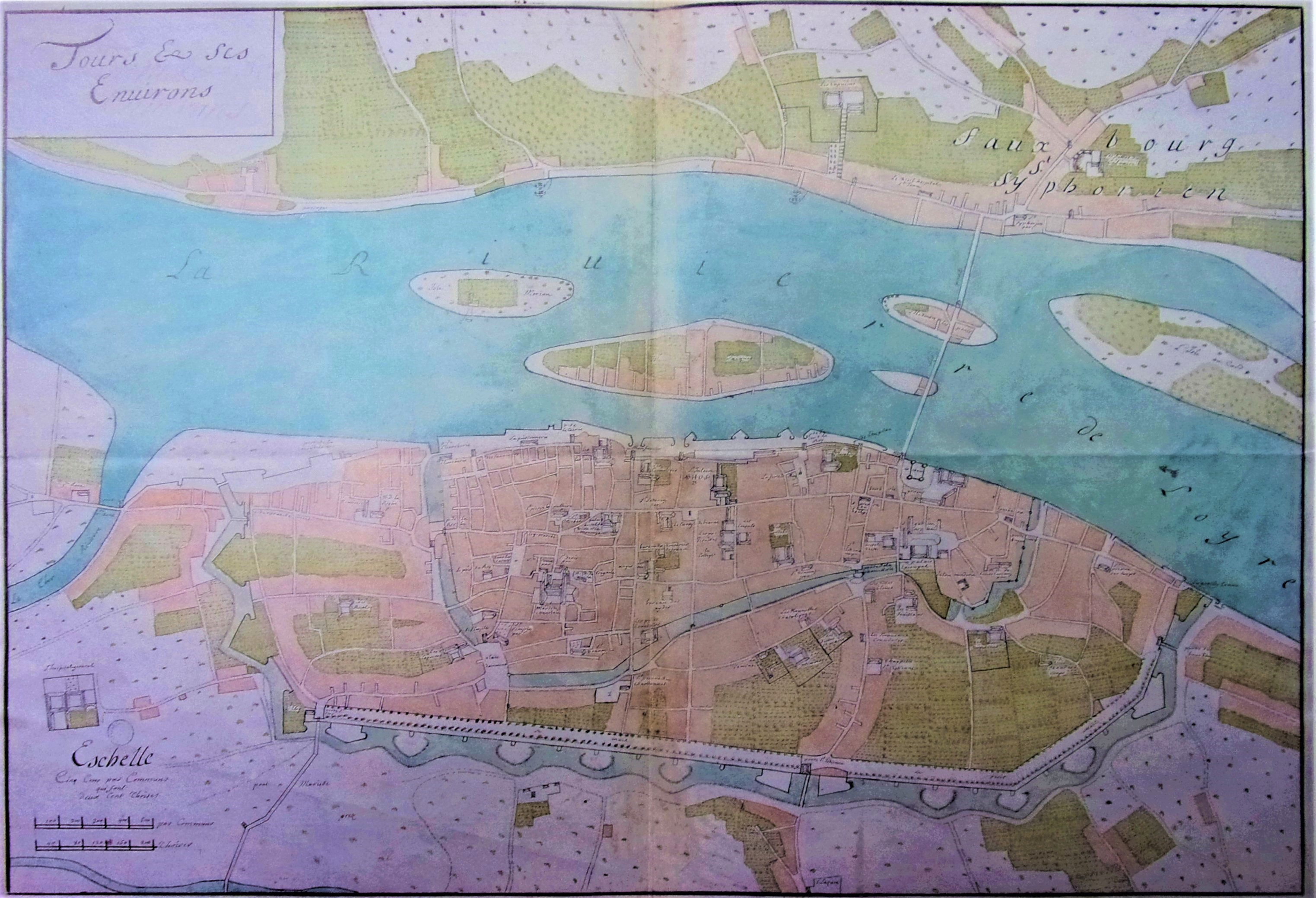
Wash drawing attributed to Tonon de Rochefou around 1680: some bastions are unfinished.

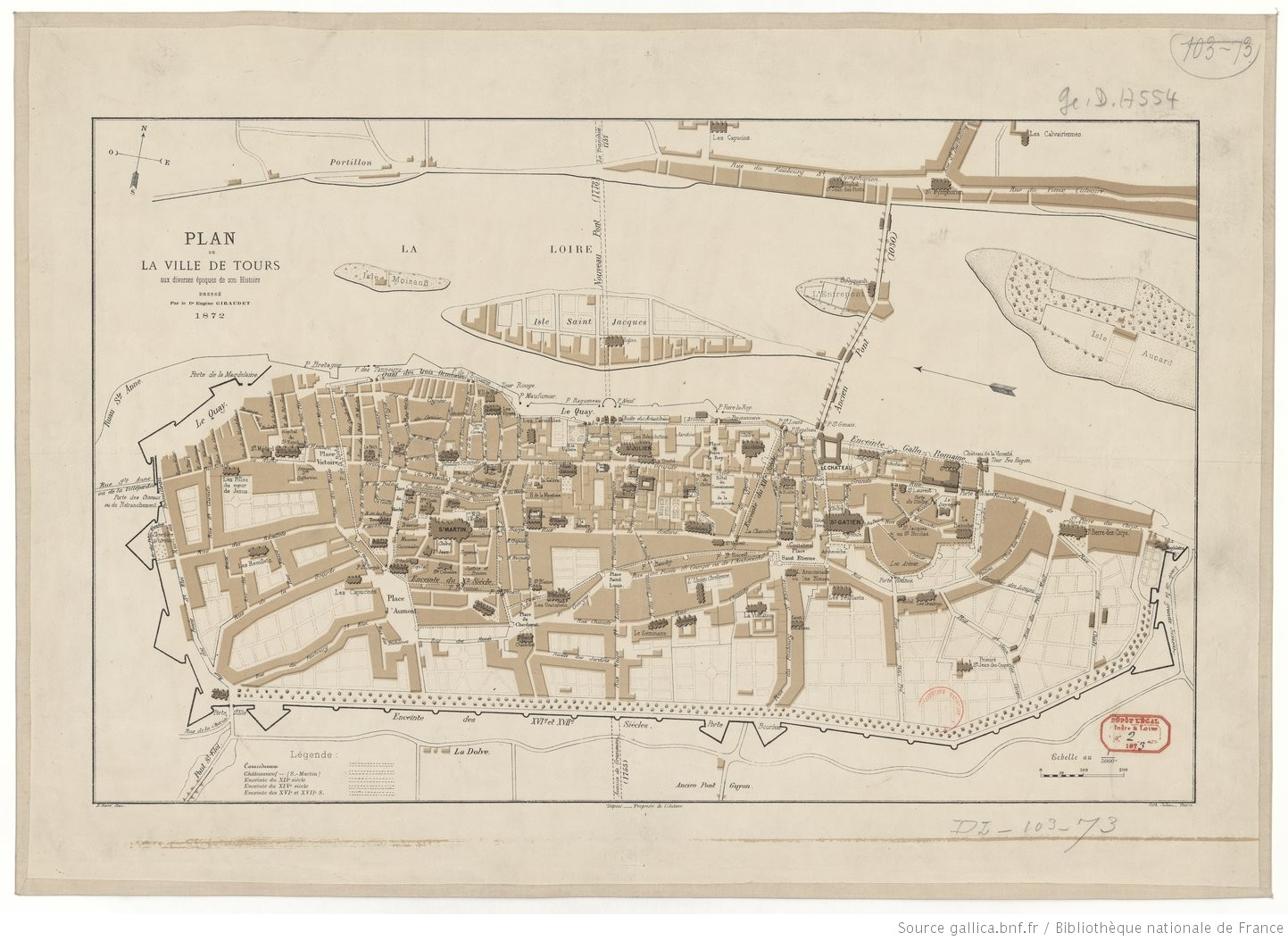
Plan by Eugène Giraudet in 1873: the unfinished bastions have disappeared. (Note: Giraudet 1873, vol. I)

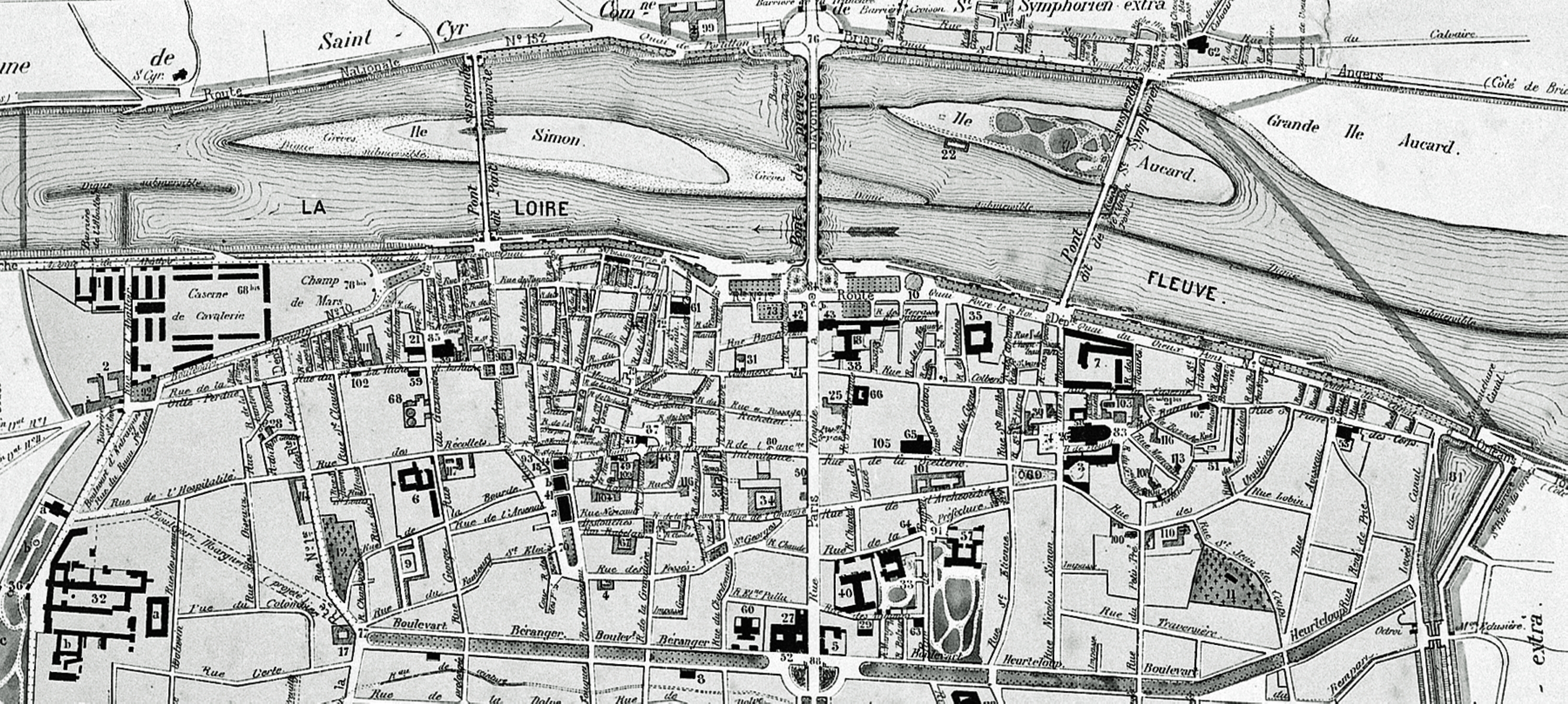
Lithograph by Ch. Guilland around 1880: the walls no longer appear, except to the east near the tollgate; only the boulevards mark their former route.

== Imprint on the urban landscape ==
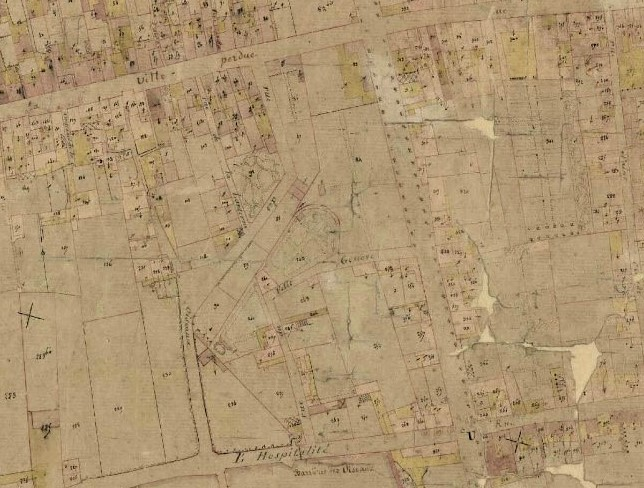
Rue des Oiseaux, on the Napoleonic cadastre, skirting a bastion of the city walls at the Porte des Oiseaux.

The rampart, dismantled during urban development and the reorientation of Tours’ main axis from east–west to north–south with the opening of Rue Nationale, (Note: Chevalier 1985, pp. 186–188) influenced the city's modern layout through two major boulevards. Planned around 1816–1818 by Jean-Bernard-Abraham Jacquemin and named by 1843, these boulevards were fully developed during the Second Empire with roadways added alongside the tree-lined alleys. Rue Léon-Boyer traces the western face of the former rampart. (Note: Livernet 1982, p. 357)

By the mid-20th century, the rampart's elevation was largely gone, though many 19th-century residences were built on its foundations. (Note: Livernet 1982, p. 352) Some remnants remained visible among modern buildings into the 21st century. In 1988, public authorities were warned of the risk of these remnants disappearing due to new urban development projects.

In the western part of rue Victor-Hugo, near the Saint-Éloi priory, at the end of an alley opening onto the northern side of the street (47.388198, 0.677872) (A), (Note: The letters in parentheses refer to the markers on the figure "The Ramparts of Tours in the 17th Century.") a molding that once adorned the upper section of the curtain wall of the Saint-Joseph bastion remains visible for several meters. Behind the Saint-Éloi priory, at the corner of rue Verte and rue Élise-Dreux (47.38772, 0.675353) (B), the tip of the southwest bastion (Saint-Éloi bastion) of the rampart is still identifiable; the bastion wall continues along rue Élise-Dreux. On rue des Oiseaux (47.391323, 0.67186) (C), as well as on rue Ledru-Rollin and impasse Adrien-Deslondains (47.389921, 0.673465) (D), the cadastral irregularities and the layout of the buildings reflect the shape of two former bastions on the western side, namely the Bastion des Oiseaux and the Bastion de la Santé; the northern orillon of the Bastion des Oiseaux remains visible on the Napoleonic cadastral map. At the opposite end of the city, on boulevard Heurteloup (47.393884, 0.704135) (E), a building courtyard is enclosed by a row of garages that recreate the shape of the orillon of the Bastion de Souvré. The remains of the bastion that flanked the eastern side of the Saint-Étienne gate, near the train station, were uncovered and studied during the excavation for the underground parking lot beneath Place du Général-Leclerc; they were later destroyed. (Note: Galinié 2007, pp. 132–133) Remains of the western bastion of the same gate had already been found during the construction of the Tours tourist office in 1965. To the north, the trace of the rampart on either side of the rue Ragueneau landing stage (47.396554, 0.686068) (F) is reproduced in the paving of the modern ground surface.

In Tours, France, south of the boulevards, the streets Dolve, Bordeaux, and Rempart (Note: Before the construction of the landing stage, rue de Bordeaux formed the western part of rue du Rempart.) trace the path of a former defensive stream that protected the city ramparts. Their winding layouts reflect the locations of former bastions, constructed either in masonry or shaped from earth. Similarly, at the southwestern corner, the streets Verte and Élise-Dreux follow the outline of the historic fortifications.

On June 12, 1991, following an investigation that began in 1987, the rampart was entered into the General inventory of cultural heritage.

The city walls of Tours in the 17th century.

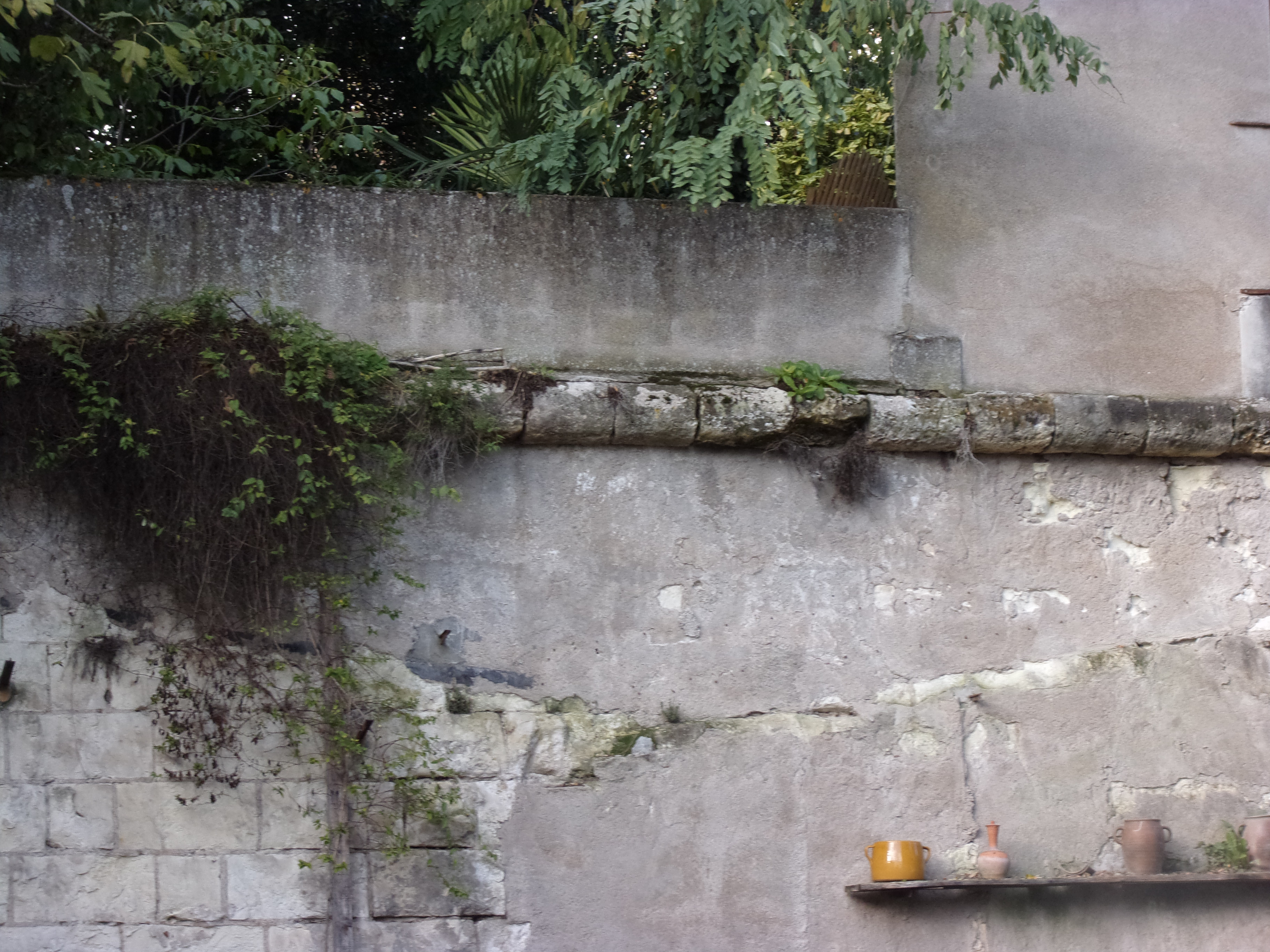
On Rue Victor-Hugo, remnants of the curtain wall (wall and molding) of the Saint-Joseph bastion have been preserved.

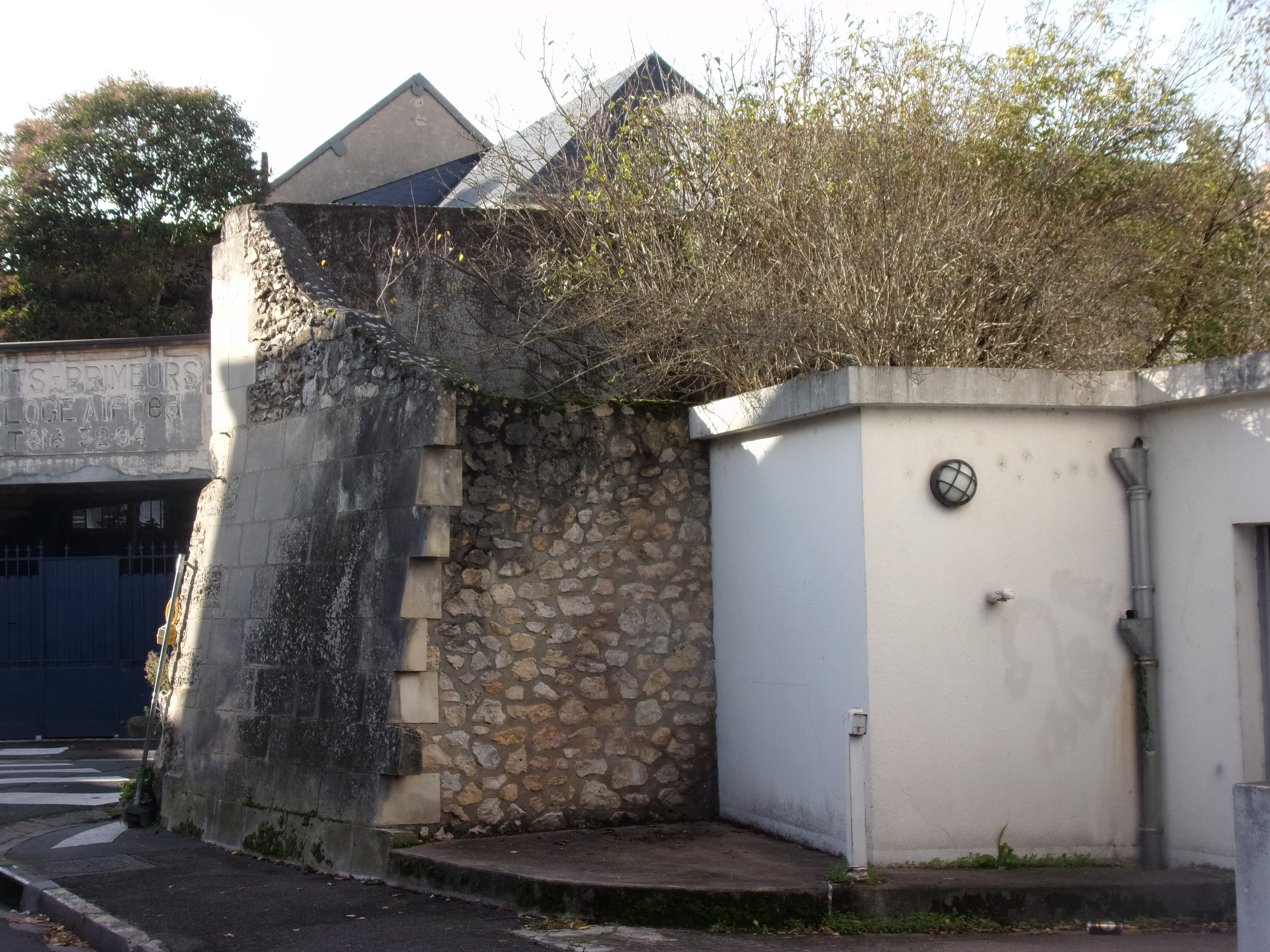
The tip of the Saint-Éloi bastion marks the corner of Rue Verte and Rue Élise-Dreux.

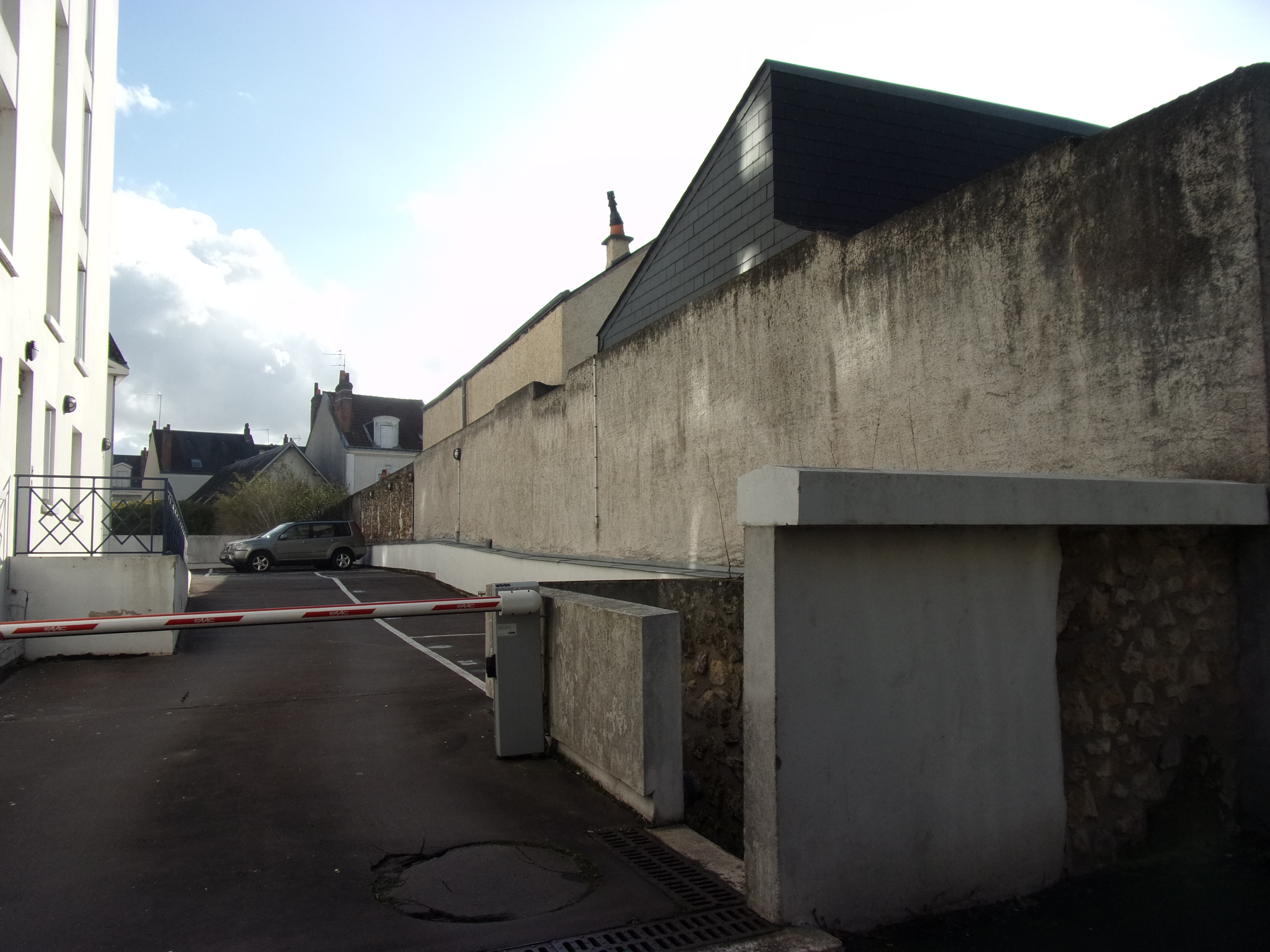
Along Rue Élise-Dreux, the wall of the Saint-Éloi bastion borders a building courtyard.

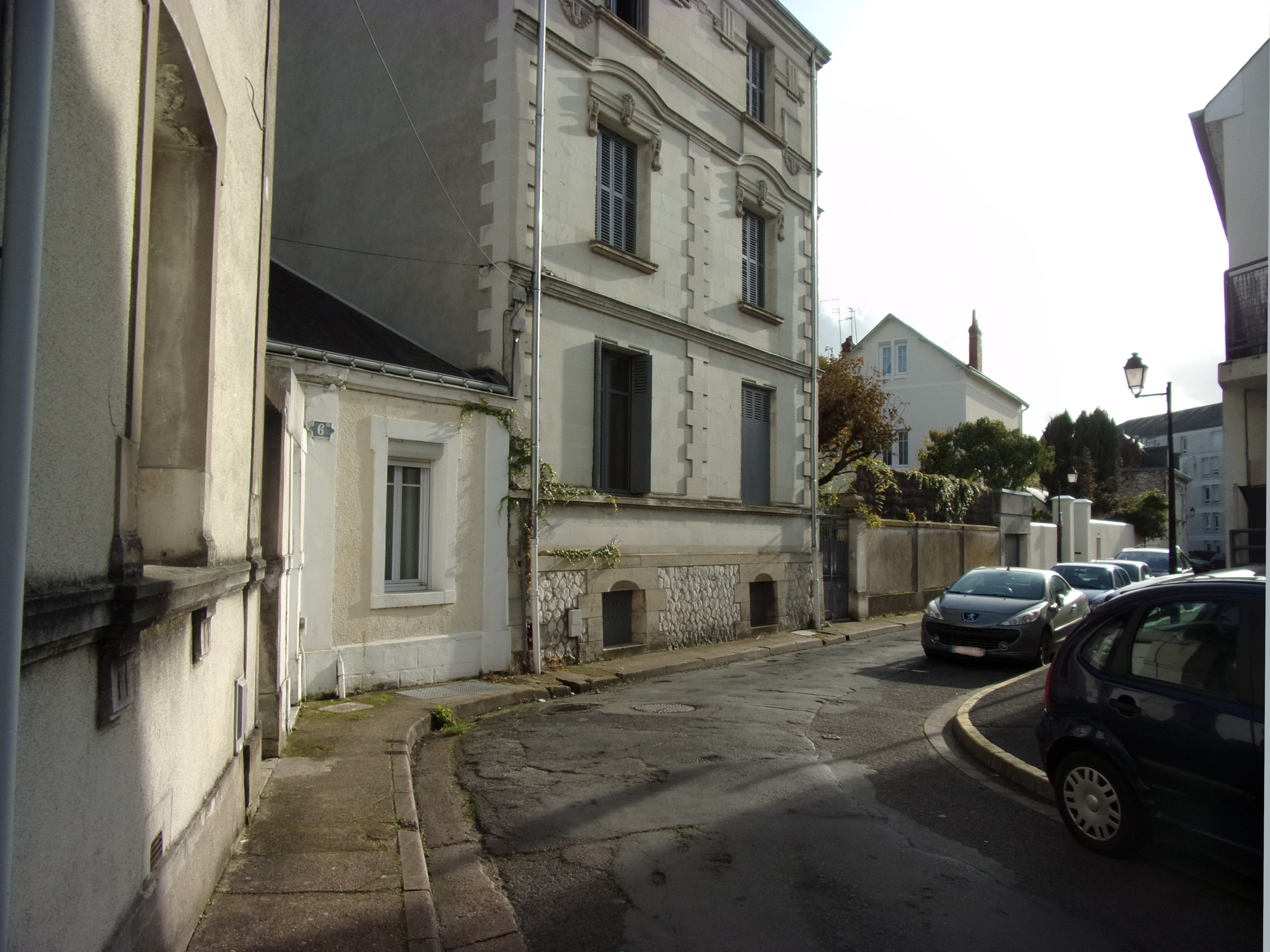
Rue des Oiseaux: the road skirts around the site of the Oiseaux bastion.

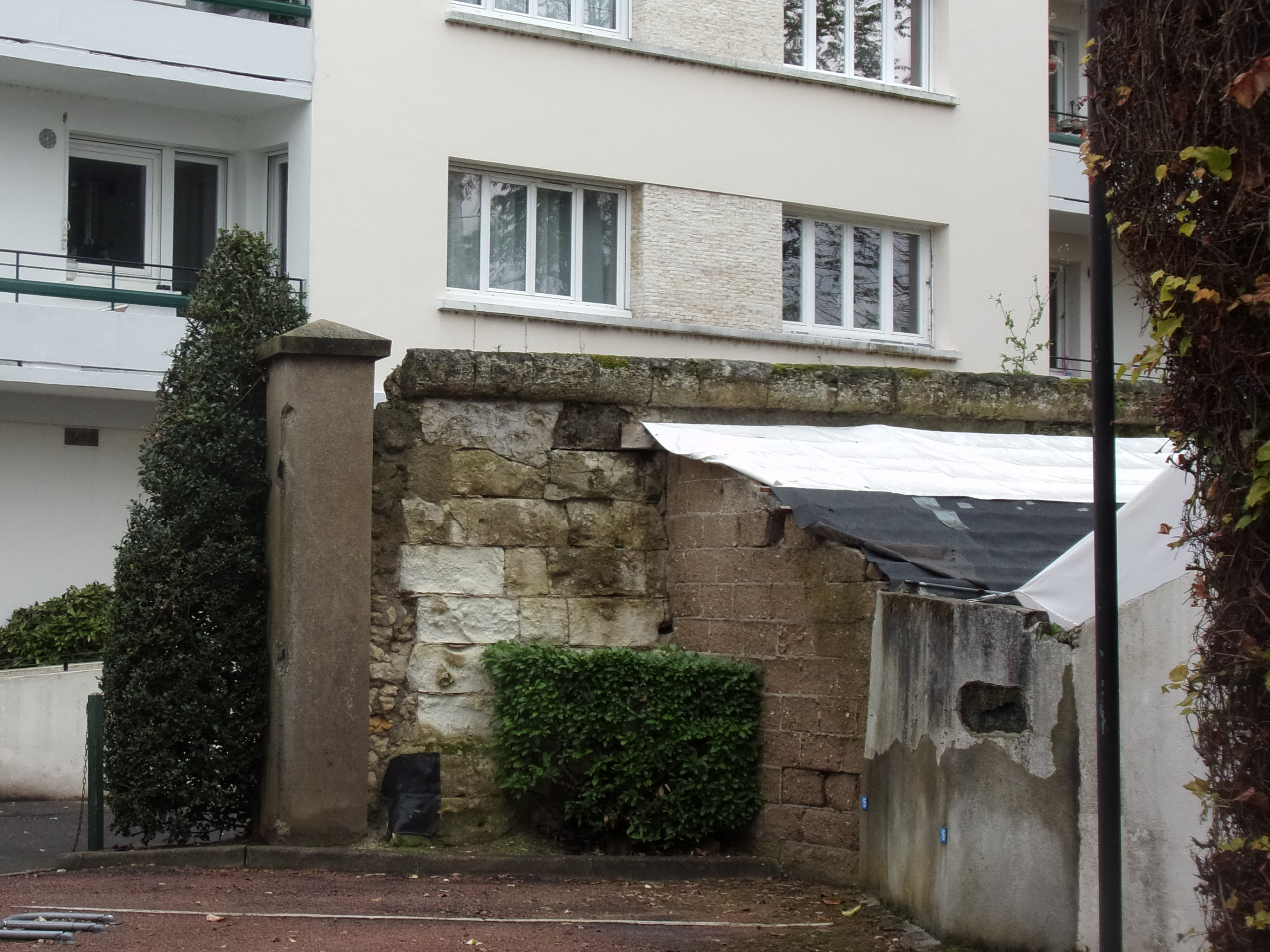
Impasse Adrien-Deslondains: the wall of the Santé bastion and its molding are partially preserved.

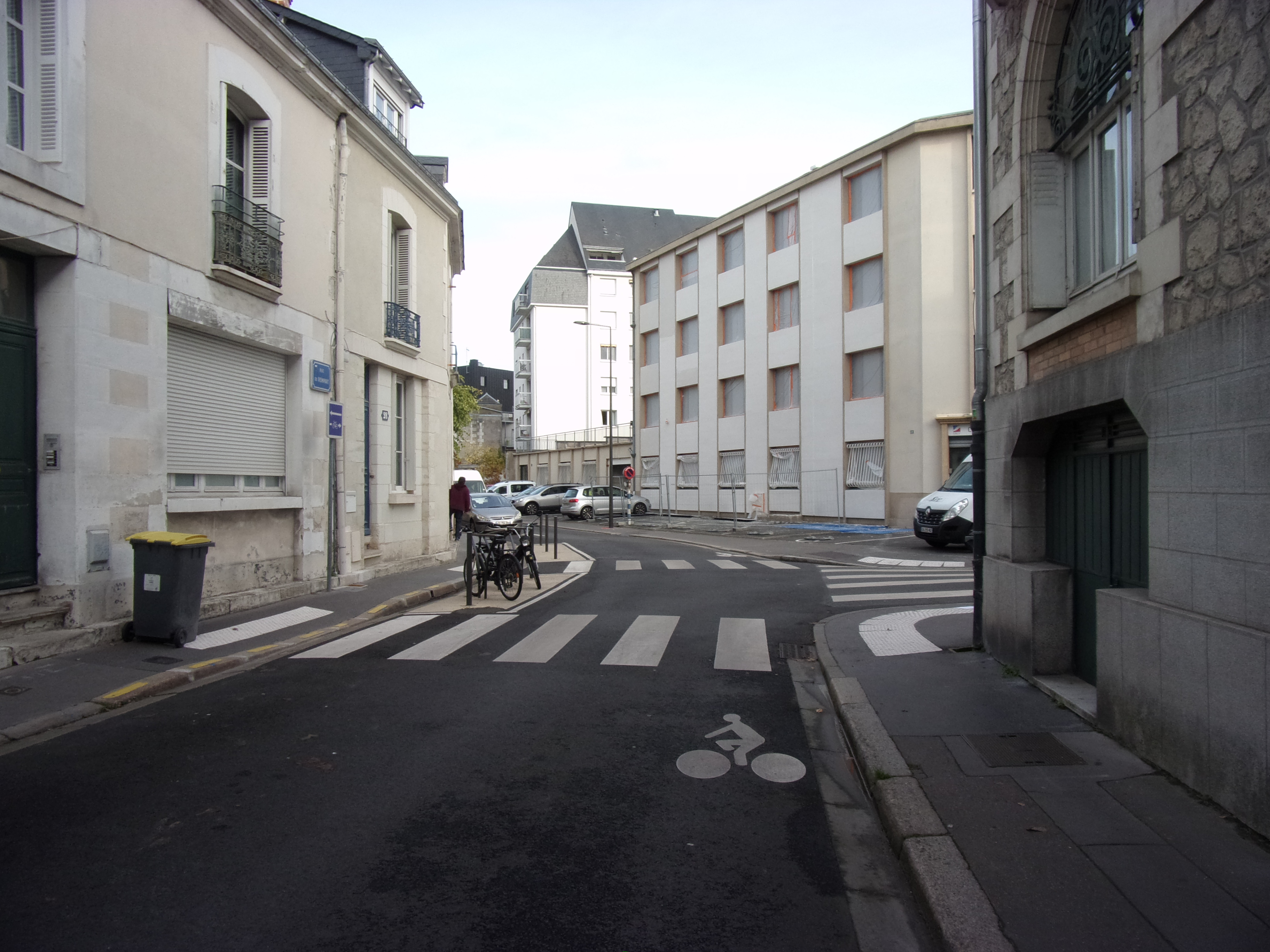
Rue du Rempart follows the winding course of the belt stream and the bastions.

== Historical and archaeological studies ==
In Tours, France, archaeological excavations and observations of the historic ramparts are sporadic, typically conducted as preventive measures before urban development projects, which are infrequent in the areas associated with the fortifications.

In 1982, Sylvain Livernet's doctoral thesis, Tours du XVIIIe au XXe siècle. La conservation des éléments anciens dans une ville moderne, included sections analyzing the preservation of Tours' historic rampart remains and their integration into the modern urban landscape.

In 1991, Didier Dubant published findings in the Bulletin of the Archaeological Society of Touraine from observations made during the construction of an underground parking lot near Tours train station. In 2006, he further analyzed the Tours ramparts in the same journal, focusing on their architectural design, history, and role.

In 2002, a team from the National Institute for Preventive Archaeological Research, led by Nicolas Fouillet, examined developments along the Loire front, including the construction of the bastioned rampart, during excavations for an underground parking garage at Place Anatole-France in Tours. The primary findings were published in 2007 in Tours antique et médiéval. Lieux de vie, temps de la ville. 40 ans d'archéologie urbaine, a collective work on the history of archaeology in Tours.

== The bastioned rampart in literature ==
In 1660, Father Martin Marteau described (Note: Giraudet 1873, pp. 146–147, vol. II) in Le Paradis délicieux de la Touraine the mall constructed along the Tours ramparts, lined with rows of elm trees.

In Voyages en France en 1787, 1788 et 1789, Arthur Young described arriving in Tours on September 5, 1787, and noting the four rows of elm trees lining the promenade along the city's historic ramparts.

In his unfinished novel Sténie ou les erreurs philosophiques, started around 1819 or 1820, Honoré de Balzac describes the Tours ramparts, noting their historical significance from the civil wars, with filled-in ditches, vine-covered walls, and bastions where fruit and vegetable gardens have replaced former defensive structures.

According to historian Claude Petitfrère in a 1995 publication on Traditions et innovations dans la France du XVIII^{e} siècle, the malls along the Tours ramparts are frequently highlighted in various eighteenth-century travel narratives.

== See also ==
- Bastion fort

== Bibliography ==
- Chevalier, Bernard (1985). Histoire de Tours [History of Tours] (in French). Toulouse: Privat. ISBN 2-7089-8224-9.
- Crozet, René (1954). "Circulation routière et travaux d'urbanisme à Tours au XVIIIe siècle" [Road traffic and urban planning in Tours in the 18th century]. Urbanisme et architecture, études écrites et publiées en l'honneur de Pierre Lavedan [Urban planning and architecture, written studies published in honor of Pierre Lavedan] (in French). Paris: Laurens. pp. 93–101.
- Dubant, Didier (1991a). "Fouilles de la place du Général-Leclerc – Site 016, rapport préliminaire" [Excavations at Place du Général-Leclerc – Site 016, preliminary report]. Bulletin de la Société archéologique de Touraine (in French). XLIII: 97–103. ISSN 1153-2521.
- Dubant, Didier (2006). "L'enceinte urbaine de la fin XVIe-début XVIIe siècle à Tours (37) : nature et fonction" [The urban enclosure of Tours (37) in the late 16th and early 17th centuries: nature and function]. Bulletin de la Société archéologique de Touraine (in French). LII: 223–234. ISSN 1153-2521.
- Dubant, Didier (2010). "L'évolution du quartier de la gare de Tours, du milieu du XVIe siècle jusqu'à la disparition de « l'Embarcadère » à la fin du XIXe siècle (étude historique, cartographique et archéologique)" [The evolution of the Tours station district from the mid-16th century to the disappearance of the “Embarcadère” at the end of the 19th century (historical, cartographic, and archaeological study)]. Bulletin de la Société archéologique de Touraine (in French). LVI: 157–174. ISSN 1153-2521.
- Galinié, Henri (2007). Tours antique et médiéval. Lieux de vie, temps de la ville. 40 ans d'archéologie urbaine, Supplément à la RACF n° 30, numéro spécial de la collection Recherches sur Tours [Ancient and medieval Tours. Places of life, times of the city. 40 years of urban archaeology, Supplement to RACF No. 30, special issue of the Recherches sur Tours collection] (in French). Tours: FERACF. ISBN 978-2-9132-7215-6.
- Gascuel, Geneviève (1999). À la découverte des noms des rues de Tours [Discovering the names of streets in Tours] (in French). Montreuil-Bellay: CMD. ISBN 2-84477-024-X.
- Giraudet, Alexandre (1844). Tours : ses monuments, son industrie, ses grands hommes [Tours: its monuments, its industry, its famous figures] (in French). O. Lescène.
- Giraudet, Eugène (1873). Histoire de la ville de Tours [History of the city of Tours] (in French). Vol. I & II. Tours: Les principaux libraires.
- Giraudet, Eugène (1885). "Les artistes tourangeaux" [Artists from Tours]. Mémoires de la Société archéologique de Touraine (in French). XXXIII: 1–420.
- de Grandmaison, Charles (1856). "Aperçus historiques sur les travaux destinés à défendre la ville de Tours, contre les inondations de la Loire et du Cher" [Historical overview of the works designed to protect the city of Tours against flooding from the Loire and Cher rivers]. Mémoires de la Société archéologique de Touraine (in French). VIII: 82–90.
- Leveel, Pierre (1994). La Touraine disparue et ses abords immédiats [The lost Touraine region and its immediate surroundings] (in French). Chambray-lès-Tours: CLD. ISBN 2-8544-3253-3.
- Livernet, Sylvain (1982). Tours du XVIIIe au XXe siècle. La conservation des éléments anciens dans une ville moderne [Towers from the 18th to the 20th century. Preserving old elements in a modern city] (in French). Vol. I. Lille: University of Lille.
