= Amphitheater of Caligula =

Ancient Roman amphitheater in Rome

- Amphitheatrum Caligulae (Latin)
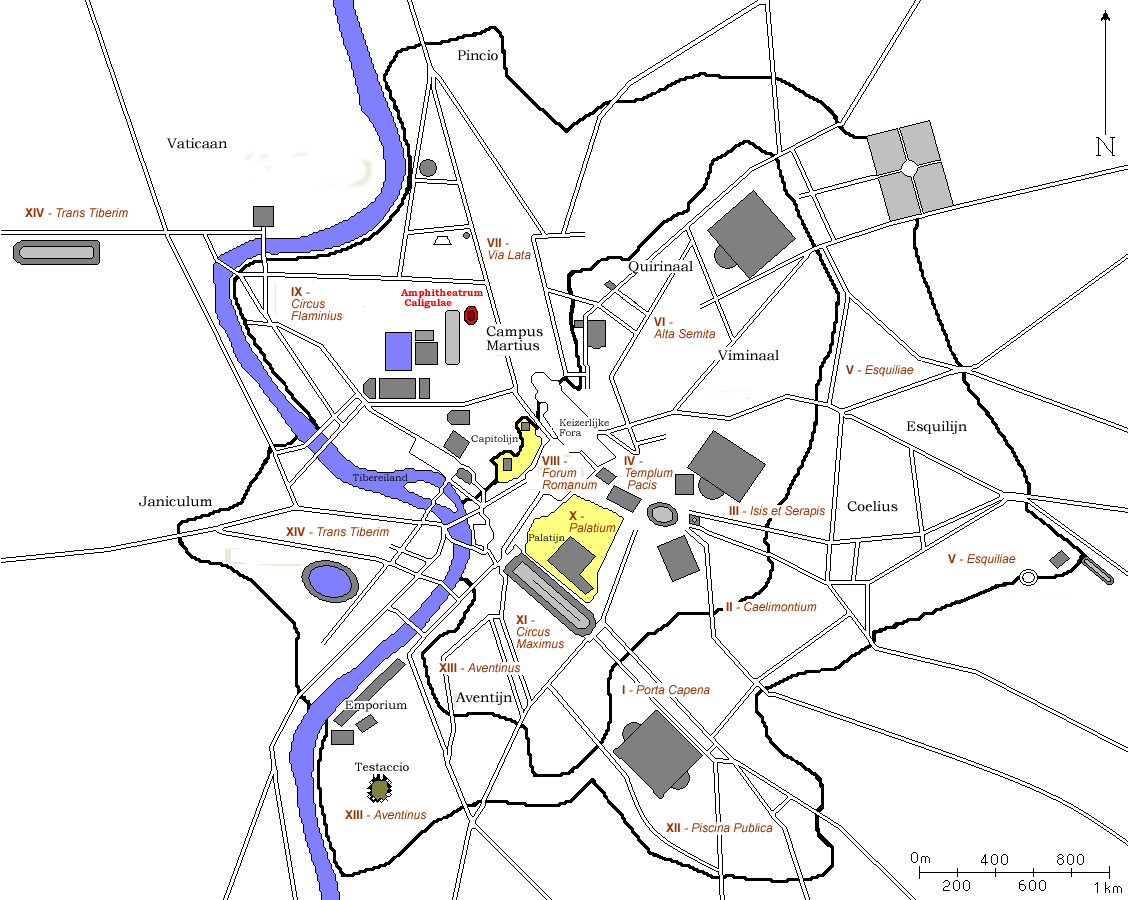
- Hypothetical location of the Amphitheater of Caligula on a map of ancient Rome

- Shown within Augustan Rome
- 41°53′59″N 12°28′40″E
- Type: Amphitheatre
- Location: Regio IX Circus Flaminius, Rome, Italy

History
- Built: 37-41 CE
- Built by: Caligula
- Abandoned: 46 CE

Site notes
- Condition: Nonextant

The Amphitheater of Caligula (Latin: Amphitheatrum Caligulae) was a Roman amphitheater begun during the reign of Caligula and demolished only a few years after construction commenced. It was located on the Campus Martius in Rome, probably near the Saepta Julia.

Construction began between 37 and 41 CE, when Caligula sought to provide Rome with a stone amphitheater, either to supplement or to replace the Amphitheater of Statilius Tarus. The structure was still incomplete at the time of his death and was subsequently abandoned and demolished by Claudius.

In about 46 CE, Claudius repaired the Aqua Virgo, which had been damaged during construction of the amphitheater. The restoration was commemorated by an inscription on the Arch of Claudius, an arch forming part of the aqueduct that spanned the Via Lata. It reads:

Latin: Ti(berius) Claudius Drusi f(ilius) Caesar Augustus Germanicus / pontifex maxim(imus) trib(unicia) potest(ate) V imp(erator) XI p(ater) p(atriae) co(n)s(ul) desig(natus) IIII / arcus ductus aquae Virginis disturbatos per C(aium) Caesarem / a fundamentis novos fecit ac restituit.

English: Tiberius Claudius Caesar Augustus Germanicus, son of Drusus, pontifex maximus, in his fifth year of tribunician power, imperator eleven times, father of his country, consul designate for the fourth time, made new and restored from their foundations the arcades of the Aqua Virgo, since they had been knocked down by Gaius Caesar (Caligula).

It is possible that Caligula intended to reroute the aqueduct around the amphitheater rather than entirely destroy it.

== See also ==
- List of Roman amphitheatres
