= Roman Amphitheatre of Cagliari =

Ancient Roman amphitheater in Cagliari, Italy

Coordinates: 39.223914°N 9.113216°E

- Anfiteatro romano di Cagliari (Italian)
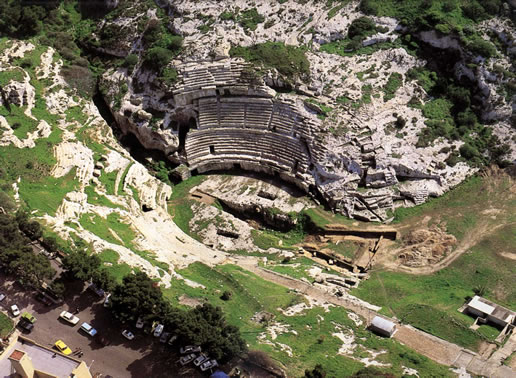
- Aerial view

- Location within Italy
- Type: Roman amphitheatre
- Cultures: Roman
- Location: Cagliari, Sardinia, Italy
- Region: Sardinia

History
- Built: 2nd century

Site notes
- Management: Superintendence for the Archaeological Heritage in the Provinces of Cagliari and Oristano (Soprintendenza per i Beni Archeologici per le province di Cagliari e Oristano)
- Public access: Yes

The Roman Amphitheatre of Cagliari is an ancient Roman amphitheatre, located in the city of Cagliari, southern Sardinia, Italy.

The structure, built in the 2nd century AD, was half carved in the rock, while the rest was built in local white limestone, with a façade surpassing 20 m in height. The building axes measured about 93x80, those of the arena about 46.20x31.00. The surface of the arena was 1124.27 square meters. It housed fights between men and animals, of gladiators and other specialized fighters recruited in and outside Sardinia. It was also the seat of public executions. It could house up to 8,000 spectators, some one fourth of the Roman Caralis.

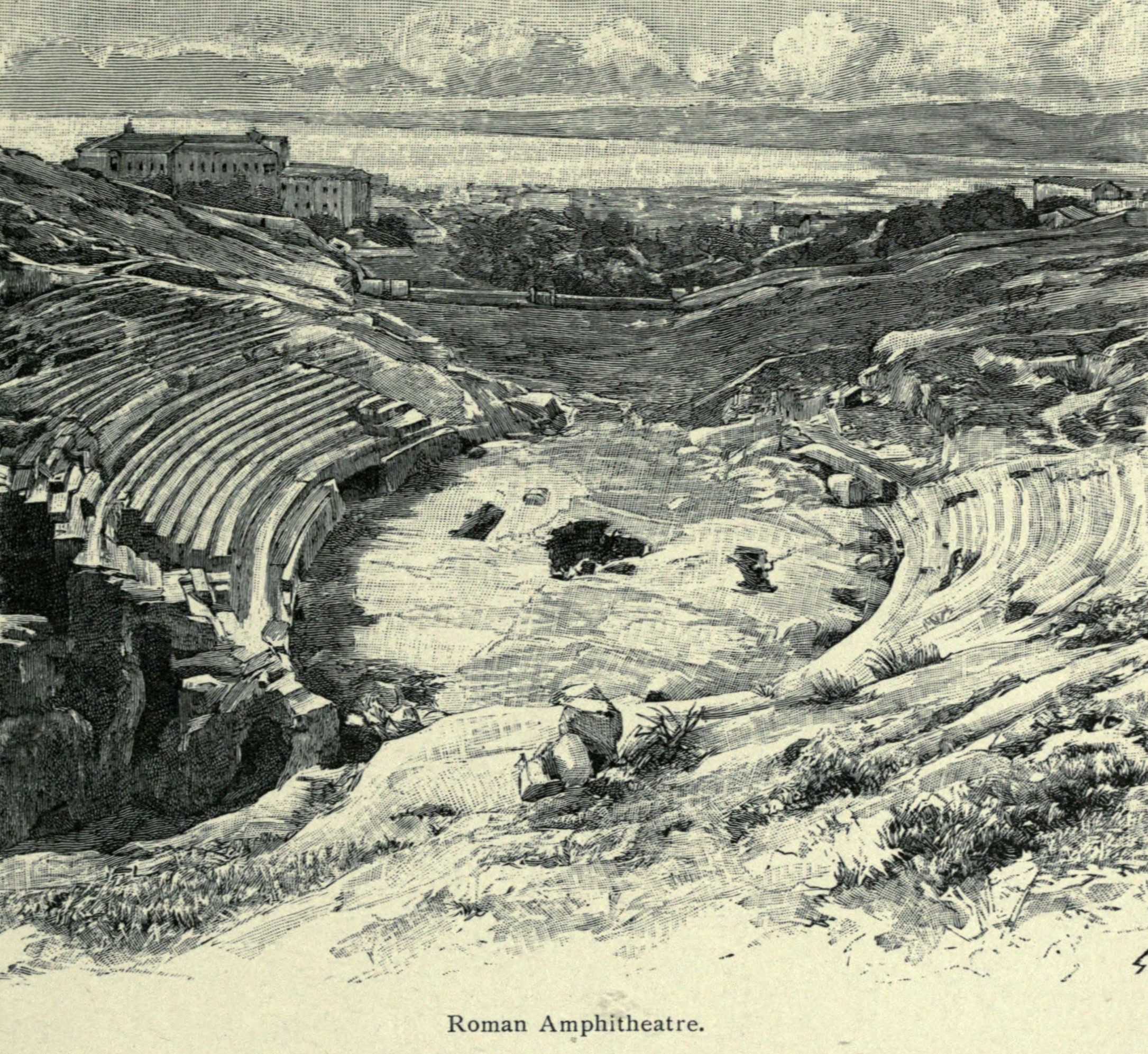
The amphitheatre in 1896

The amphitheatre was no longer in use starting from the 5th century AD and was subsequently used as a free stone quarry by the rulers of the area, from the Byzantines, the Republic of Pisa, the House of Aragon and others. The area was acquired by the comune of Cagliari in the 19th century and excavated under the direction of a clergyman, Giovanni Spano.

== See also ==
- List of Roman amphitheatres
