= List of Roman amphitheatres =

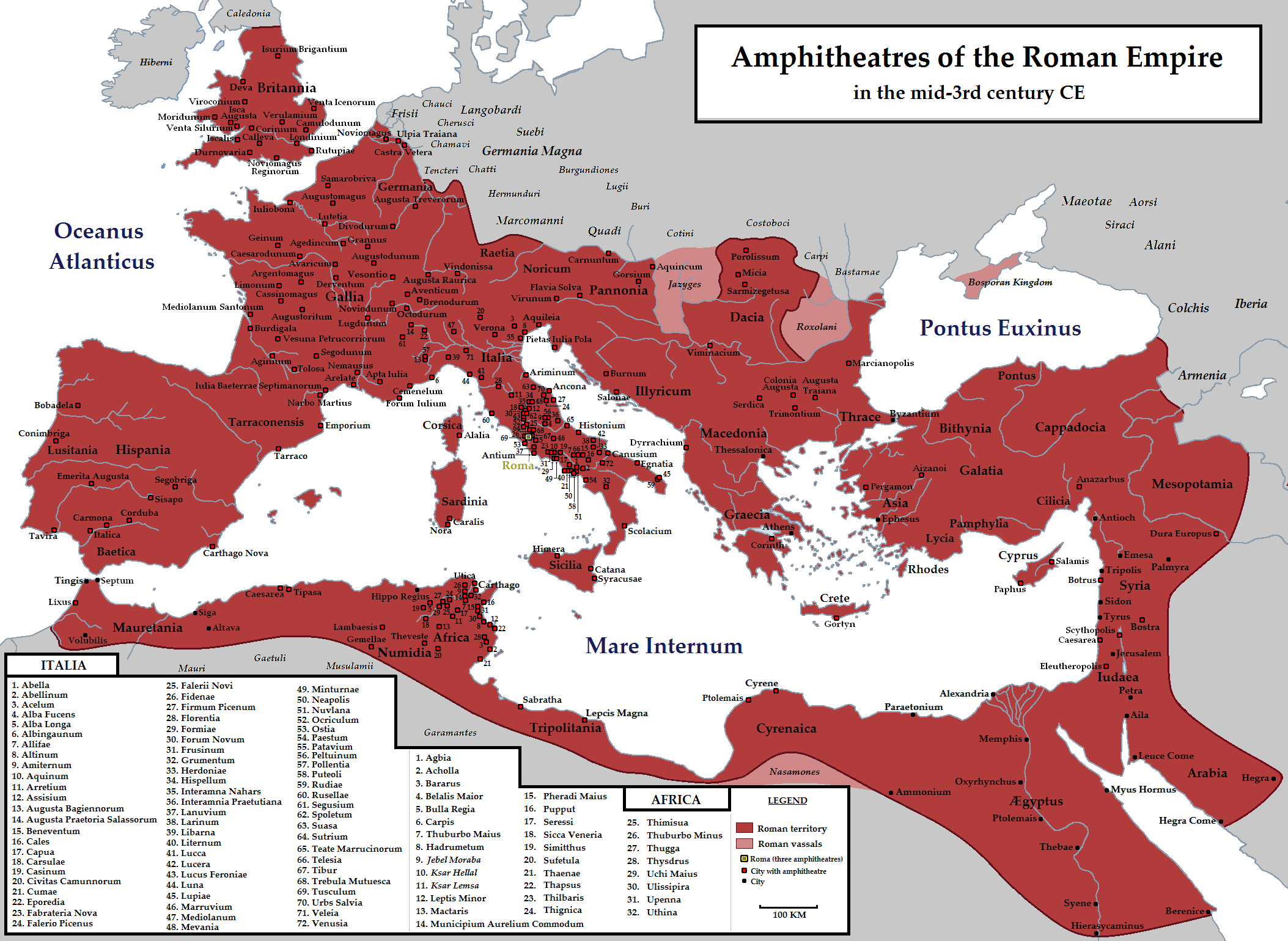
Map of Roman amphitheatres

The remains of at least 230 Roman amphitheatres have been found widely scattered around the area of the Roman Empire. These are large, circular or oval open-air venues with raised 360 degree seating and not to be confused with the more common theatres, which are semicircular structures. There are, however, a number of buildings that have had a combined use as both theatre and amphitheatre, particularly in western Europe. Following is an incomplete list of Roman amphitheatre locations by country.

City (Roman name)	City (modern name)	Country	Year of construction	Coordinates	External Axes (m)	Notes References	Photograph
Dyrrhachium	Durrës	Albania	2nd century AD	41.312186°N 19.445323°E	132 x 113	Durrës Amphitheatre	
Lambaesis	Lambèse	Algeria		35.489247°N 6.259935°E			
Colonia Claudia Caesarea	Cherchell	Algeria		36.608740°N 2.198826°E			
Gemellae	M'lili	Algeria		34.635409°N 5.522764°E			
Mesarfelta		Algeria					
Rusicade	Skikda	Algeria					
Theveste	Tébessa	Algeria	4th century AD	35.401246°N 8.123764°E		Aerial Photograph	
Tigava	El Attaf	Algeria		36.228°N 1.647°E			
Tipasa	Tipaza	Algeria		36.593152°N 2.445456°E		Map of Tipasa	
Brigantium	Bregenz	Austria		47.500461°N 9.747879°E		Roman Theatre (Bregenz)	
Carnuntum	Petronell	Austria		48.1101°N 16.8509°E 48.1269°N 16.8927°E		2 amphitheatres	
Flavia Solva	Leibnitz	Austria		46.766744°N 15.567417°E			
	Gleisdorf	Austria		47.111°N 15.708°E			
Virunum	Magdalensberg	Austria		46.697951°N 14.366943°E			
Augusta Traiana	Stara Zagora	Bulgaria					
Diocletianopolis (Thrace)	Hisarya	Bulgaria		42.502825°N 24.709776°E			
Marcianopolis	Devnya	Bulgaria		43.222222°N 27.569444°E			
Serdica	Sofia	Bulgaria	3rd century AD	42.697803°N 23.330031°E	60 x 43	Amphitheatre of Serdica	
Pietas Iulia Pola	Pula	Croatia	1st century AD	44.873176°N 13.850112°E	132 x 105	Pula Arena	
Salona	Solin	Croatia	3rd century AD	43.538469°N 16.473956°E	125 x 100		
Burnum	Šibenik-Knin County	Croatia	27 BC-14 AD	44.0192°N 16.0182°E	101 x 77	Roman military camp near Šibenik, had a small amphitheatre, recently discovered	
Nea Paphos	Paphos	Cyprus		34.754942°N 32.405344°E			
Salamis		Cyprus		35.185522°N 33.90238°E		Amphitheatre almost vanished.	
Calleva Atrebatum	Silchester	England		51.35885°N 1.07528°W			
Camulodunum	Colchester	England		51.883333°N 0.9°E		Located in 2005 (near Circular Road North)	
Corinium Dobunnorum	Cirencester	England	2nd century AD	51.711500°N 1.972190°W		Cirencester Amphitheatre	
Deva Victrix	Chester	England	1st century AD	53.189191°N 2.887027°W	97.5 x 87.2	Chester Roman Amphitheatre	
Durnovaria	Dorchester	England		50.70790°N 2.44039°W		Maumbury Rings	
	Frilford	England		51.670833°N 1.362222°W		Debated	
Iscalis (?)	Charterhouse	England		51.3054°N 2.72032°W			
Isurium Brigantum	Aldborough	England		54.088179°N 1.381325°W			
Londinium	London	England	1st century AD	51.515546°N 0.092215°W		Amphitheatre (London)	
Noviomagus Reginorum	Chichester	England		50.835448°N 0.772496°W			
Rutupiae	Richborough	England		51.290171°N 1.326534°E			
Viroconium Cornoviorum	Wroxeter	England		52.666667°N 2.65°W		No confirmed amphitheatre found at Wroxeter. Speculation as to purpose of cropmark enclosure includes such.	
Venta Icenorum	Caistor St Edmund	England		52.579979°N 1.288262°E			
Verulamium	St Albans	England		51.75404°N 0.3583°W		Theatre that had been used as an amphitheatre; note the almost oval shape.	
Agedincum	Sens	France		48.200036°N 3.292997°E			
Aginnum	Agen	France		44.204938°N 0.613258°E			
Alalia	Aléria	France		42.10091746°N 9.510191931°E		Corsica	
Apta Julia	Apt	France		43.876569°N 5.397437°E		No remains of Amphitheatre located. This is the theatre.	
Arelate	Arles	France	1st century AD	43.67776°N 4.630936°E	136 x 109	Arles Amphitheatre. Still in use today for bull games (where the bulls are not harmed), plays, concerts & events.	
Argentomagus	Argenton-sur-Creuse	France		46.599061°N 1.509718°E		Theatre used also as amphitheatre.	
Augustodunum	Autun	France		46.951667°N 4.299444°E	154 x 130	Last traces of the amphitheatre disappeared during the 17th century.	
Augustomagus	Senlis	France		49.205191°N 2.575768°E		Theatre used as amphitheatre. Photograph	
Augustoritum	Limoges	France		45.830446°N 1.251743°E			
Avaricum	Bourges	France		47.0845°N 2.39087°E			
	Beaumont-sur-Oise	France		49.146210°N 2.296752°E			
Burdigala	Bordeaux	France		44.847725°N 0.5826583°W			
Caesarodunum	Tours	France	1st century AD	47.3953°N 0.696394°E	156 x 134	Tours Amphitheatre	
Cassinomagus	Chassenon	France		45.850565°N 0.768990°E			
Divona Cadurcorum	Cahors	France		44.4455°N 1.4408°E		Discovered in 2007 when digging a parking garage	
Cemenelum	Nice	France		43.71996°N 7.275394°E			
Derventum	Drevant	France		46.693051°N 2.522388°E		Theatre that had been adapted for gladiatorial events	
Divodurum	Metz	France		49.119631°N 6.172198°E	148 x 124		
Forum Iulium	Fréjus	France		43.4344472°N 6.7285°E	113 x 83	Arènes de Fréjus	
Geinum	Gennes	France		47.3352083°N 0.23873°W			
Grannus	Grand	France		48.385268°N 5.491047°E		Archaeological site of Grand A "half amphitheatre", distinguished from a normal theatre by its oval layout.	
Julia Baeterrae Septimanorum	Béziers	France		43.3396°N 3.2141°E			
Juliobona	Lillebonne	France		49.517815°N 0.536603°E		A half-amphitheatre.	
Limonum	Poitiers	France		46.5781°N 0.33965°E			
Lugdunum	Lyon	France	1st century AD	45.7704972°N 4.8305972°E	81 x 60	Amphitheatre of the Three Gauls	
Lutetia	Paris	France	1st century AD	48.8451°N 2.3529°E		Arènes de Lutèce	
Mediolanum Santonum	Saintes	France		45.745892°N 0.644060°W			
	Montbouy	France		47.872894°N 2.819046°E			
Narbo Martius	Narbonne	France		43.1836°N 3.0042°E		Narbonne amphitheatre	
Nemausus	Nîmes	France	1st century AD	43.834914°N 4.35965278°E	133 x 101	Arena of Nîmes. Still in use today (for Bullfighting, plays, concerts & events).	
Samarobriva	Amiens	France		49.534020°N 2.174333°E		Now underground and buried	
Segodunum	Rodez	France		44.3518°N 2.56939°E			
Tolosa	Toulouse	France		43.614780°N 1.397841°E			
Vesontio	Besançon	France		47.239279°N 6.015977°E		Arenas of Besançon	
Vesuna Petrucorriorum	Périgueux	France		45.1827°N 0.7134°E			
Augusta Treverorum	Trier	Germany	2nd century AD	49.748019°N 6.649105°E	70.54 x 47.50	Trier Amphitheater	
	Arnsburg, Muschenheim (Lich)	Germany		50.485°N 8.788°E			
Castra Vetera		Germany		51.637517°N 6.472900°E		Near Xanten	
Colonia Ulpia Traiana	Xanten	Germany		51.667200°N 6.451251°E			
	Dambach	Germany		49.10376°N 10.58315°E			
	Künzing	Germany		48.667126°N 13.082822°E			
Corinth	Corinth	Greece		37.909824°N 22.892078°E			
Gortyn	Gortyn	Greece		35.058004°N 24.958405°E		Map of Gortyn, showing amphitheatre This is incorrect. It is a great theatre, long mistaken for an amphitheatre, but clearly D-shaped from aerial photos. The actual amphitheatre lies under the church in the village of Agioi Deka, built over the arena where the 10 saints were martyred. The shape of the arena can be made out in surrounding buildings.	
Aquincum	Budapest	Hungary		47.567577°N 19.047985°E		Aquincum Civil Amphitheatre	
Aquincum	Budapest	Hungary		47.532947°N 19.039066°E		Aquincum Military Amphitheatre	
Gorsium	Tác	Hungary					
Caesarea Maritima	Caesarea	Israel		32.506568°N 34.897378°E			
Eleutheropolis	Beit Guvrin	Israel		31.6082°N 34.8939°E			
Scythopolis	Bet She'an	Israel		32.498508°N 35.501446°E			
Abella	Avella	Italy		40.961454°N 14.608316°E		Photograph	
Abellinum	Avellino	Italy		40.91667°N 14.78333°E			
Acelum	Asolo	Italy		45.8°N 11.91667°E			
Alba Fucens	Albe	Italy		42.0772°N 13.4123°E		Photograph	
Castra Albana	Albano Laziale	Italy		41.732720°N 12.664948°E		Roman Amphitheater of Albano Laziale	
Albingaunum	Albenga	Italy		44.043859°N 8.211315°E			
Allifae	Alife	Italy		41.325586°N 14.334989°E			
Altinum	Altino	Italy		45.5492°N 12.4001°E			
Amiternum	L'Aquila	Italy		42.400513°N 13.306014°E			
Ancona	Ancona	Italy		43.6246°N 13.5119°E			
Antium	Anzio	Italy		41.45°N 12.61667°E			
Aquileia	Aquileia	Italy		45.76861°N 13.3656°E			
Aquinum	Aquino	Italy		41.5°N 13.7°E		Now completely disappeared, buried beneath the Autostrada.	
Ariminum	Rimini	Italy		44.059939°N 12.574804°E			
Arretium	Arezzo	Italy		43.460570°N 11.880326°E			
Asculum	Ascoli Piceno	Italy		42.855678°N 13.570776°E			
Assisium	Assisi	Italy		43.071079°N 12.620270°E			
Augusta Bagiennorum	Bene Vagienna	Italy		44.556327°N 7.849728°E			
Augusta Praetoria Salassorum	Aosta	Italy		45.740766°N 7.323419°E			
Beneventum	Benevento	Italy		41.132266°N 14.767640°E			
Cales	Calvi	Italy		41.201408°N 14.137759°E			
Canusium	Canosa di Puglia	Italy		41.222051°N 16.055983°E			
Capua	Santa Maria Capua Vetere	Italy	1st Century BC	41.085931°N 14.250105°E	167 x 137	Just to the south, currently being excavated beneath the Piazza Adriano are the remains of another amphitheatre, believed to predate the standing one. Amphitheatre of Capua	
Caralis	Cagliari	Italy	2nd century AD	39.223914°N 9.113216°E	93 x 79	Roman Amphitheatre of Cagliari	Cagliari Anfiteatro Romano
Carsulae		Italy		42.6395°N 12.5591°E			
Casinum	Cassino	Italy		41.482732°N 13.823544°E		Photograph	
Catăna / Catĭna	Catania	Italy		37.507335°N 15.085354°E	125 x 105	Amphitheatre of Catania	
Civitas Camunnorum	Cividate Camuno	Italy		45.9435°N 10.281°E		Estimated capacity: 5500 people. Civitas Camunnorum	
Cumae		Italy		40.841929°N 14.055903°E		Photograph	
Egnatia	Anazzo	Italy		40.887799°N 17.391103°E		Photograph	
Eporedia	Ivrea	Italy		45.4678°N 7.88769°E		Ivrea Roman Amphitheatre	
Fabrateria Nova	San Giovanni Incarico	Italy		41.518807°N 13.552995°E		Photograph	
Falerio Picenus	Falerone	Italy		43.1011°N 13.4964°E	120 × 105		
Falerii Novi		Italy		42.302694°N 12.360894°E			
Fidenae		Italy				A wooden amphitheatre collapsed here in AD 27, killing at least 20,000.	
Firmum Picenum	Fermo	Italy					
Florentia	Florence	Italy		43.769228°N 11.259521°E		Roman Amphitheatre of Florence	
Formiae	Formia	Italy		41.26667°N 13.61667°E			
Forum Cornelii	Imola	Italy		44.357803°N 11.704981°E			
Forum Novum	Vescovio	Italy					
Forum Traiani – Sardinia	Fordongianus	Italy		39.993215°N 8.804670°E		partially excavated, mostly built of wood	
Frusinum	Frosinone	Italy		39.593526°N 8.481682°E			
Grumentum	Grumento Nova	Italy		40.287320°N 15.911550°E			
Herdoniae	Ordona	Italy		41.3105°N 15.6231°E?			
Himera	Termini Imerese	Italy		37.987800°N 13.693664°E		Photograph	
Hispellum	Spello	Italy		42.995938°N 12.665265°E			
Histonium	Vasto	Italy		42.111279°N 14.707821°E			
Interamna Nahars	Terni	Italy		42.5598°N 12.6433°E			
Interamnia Praetutiana	Teramo	Italy		42.658115°N 13.703109°E		Photograph	
Lanuvium	Lanuvio	Italy		41.68333°N 12.7°E		Photograph	
Larinum	Larino	Italy		41.805529°N 14.916364°E		Photograph	
Legio	Megiddo	Israel		32.5811388888889°N 35.1836388888889°E		Legio Amphitheater	
Libarna		Italy		44.705942°N 8.867859°E		Amphitheatre of Libarna;	
Liternum	Lago di Patria	Italy		40.917073298049765°N 14.029566265509363°E			
Luca	Lucca	Italy		43.845320°N 10.506166°E		Piazza dell'Anfiteatro	
Lucera	Lucera	Italy		41.5083°N 15.3449°E		Lucera's amphitheatre	
Lucus Feroniae		Italy		42.129874°N 12.594746°E			
Luna	Luni	Italy		44.062573°N 10.022085°E			
Lupiae	Lecce	Italy		40.352473°N 18.172944°E			
Marruvium	San Benedetto dei Marsi	Italy		42.0065°N 13.6276°E			
Mediolanum	Milan	Italy	2nd century AD	45.457026°N 9.178663°E		Milan amphitheatre	
Mevania	Bevagna	Italy		42.936912°N 12.615350°E			
Minturnae	Minturno	Italy		41.241630°N 13.763832°E			
Neapolis	Naples	Italy		40.851843°N 14.255639°E			
Nora	Pula, Sardinia	Italy				Unexcavated (English)	
Nuvlana	Nola	Italy		40.927722°N 14.520287°E			
Ocriculum	Otricoli	Italy		42.411882°N 12.466898°E			
Ostia	Ostia Antica	Italy		41.753898°N 12.289925°E		New discovery	
Paestum		Italy		40.422409°N 15.006500°E			
Patavium	Padua	Italy		45.411630°N 11.879132°E		The arena has been built upon, its site commemorated in the Arena Chapel	
Peltuinum		Italy		42.286878°N 13.623418°E (?)			
Perusia	Perugia	Italy				Situated under the Palazzo della Pena.	
Pollentia	Pollenzo	Italy		44.684739°N 7.895866°E			
Pompeii	Pompei	Italy	1st century BC	40.751264°N 14.494970°E	135 x 104	Amphitheatre of Pompeii	
Puteoli	Pozzuoli	Italy	1st century AD	40.825919°N 14.125313°E	147 x 117	Flavian Amphitheater; a 2nd minor amphitheater buried beneath the nearby subway line.	
Roma	Rome	Italy	1st century AD	41.890177°N 12.492395°E	189 x 156	Colosseum	
Roma	Rome	Italy	3rd century AD	41.887569°N 12.515047°E	88 x 75.8	Amphitheatrum Castrense	
Roma	Rome	Italy	1st century AD	41.889882°N 12.494881°E		Ludus Magnus, a "training amphitheatre". No longer extant are the Amphitheater of Statilius Taurus or the Amphitheater of Nero.	
Rudiae		Italy		40.3342°N 18.1473°E?			
Rusellae	Roselle	Italy	1st century AD	42.828364°N 11.159210°E			
Scolacium	Borgia	Italy		38.82°N 16.5833°E		Photograph	
Sipontum	Siponto	Italy		41.611696°N 15.888713°E			
Segusium	Susa	Italy		45.133356°N 7.045136°E			
Spoletium	Spoleto	Italy		42.738489°N 12.739059°E			
Suasa	Castelleone di Suasa	Italy		43.6247°N 12.9867°E			
Sulci	Sant'Antioco	Italy		39.073911°N 8.451355°E		partially excavated, mostly built of wood (English)	
Sutrium	Sutri	Italy		42.239028°N 12.228974°E			
Syracusae	Syracuse	Italy		37.074178°N 15.278904°E		Roman amphitheatre of Syracuse	
Teate Marrucinorum	Chieti	Italy		42.345175°N 14.162512°E			
Telesia	Telese Terme	Italy		41.223857°N 14.501014°E			
Tharros	Cabras	Italy		39.876583°N 8.440699°E	46.47 x 46.47	circular, unexcavated, mostly built of wood (English)	
Tibur	Tivoli	Italy		41.960705°N 12.798095°E			
Trebula Mutuesca	Monteleone Sabino	Italy		42.228480°N 12.867593°E			
Tridentum	Trento	Italy		46.069225°N 11.125014°E			
Tusculum		Italy					
Tutere	Todi	Italy		42.778637°N 12.413282°E			
Urbs Salvia	Urbisaglia	Italy		43.2009°N 13.3872°E		Picture (?)	
Veleia		Italy		44.785057°N 9.723301°E			
Venafrum	Venafro	Italy		41.482710°N 14.046255°E			
Venusia	Venosa	Italy		40.969681°N 15.826380°E			
Verona	Verona	Italy	1st century AD	45.439006°N 10.994400°E	152 x 123	Verona Arena is still functional.	
Villa of the Antonines	Genzano di Roma	Italy		41.692832°N 12.696152°E			
Volaterrae	Volterra	Italy		42.650256°N 11.990112°E		Discovered in 2015.	
Volsinii	Bolsena	Italy		43.407581°N 10.86176°E			
	Zagarolo	Italy		41.858487°N 12.819272°E			
Botrus	Batroun	Lebanon		34.253315°N 35.660419°E			
Cyrene		Libya		32.824585°N 21.850739°E			
Leptis Magna		Libya		32.632251°N 14.309281°E			
Ptolemais		Libya		32.707946°N 20.945587°E			
Sabratha		Libya		32.803934°N 12.494008°E			
Lixus		Morocco		35.199735°N 6.108586°W		Amphitheater of Lixus	
Ulpia Noviomagus Batavorum	Nijmegen	The Netherlands		51.8381751°N 5.8786347°E		No longer extant, but traced out in the street paving of the present-day Rembrandstraat with a few bits of its foundations still visible	
	Bobadela	Portugal		40.361098°N 7.893427°W			
Conimbriga	Condeixa-a-Velha	Portugal	1st century BC	40.100360°N 8.495403°W		Conímbriga's amphitheatre	
Balsa	Tavira	Portugal					
Micia	Veţel	Romania		45.914951°N 22.817234°E			
Porolissum	Moigrad-Porolissum	Romania		47.177632°N 23.154054°E			
Ulpia Traiana Sarmizegetusa	Sarmizegetusa	Romania		45.516751°N 22.785838°E			
	Inveresk	Scotland					
Trimontium	Newstead	Scotland		55.6026°N 2.6775°W			
Viminacium	Stari Kostolac	Serbia		44.7167°N 21.167°E			Rekonstruisani amfiteatar
Barcino	Barcelona	Spain		41.381229°N 2.175632°E		Barcelona Roman amphitheatre and circus	
Carmo	Carmona	Spain		37.469600°N 5.650728°W			
Carthago Nova	Cartagena	Spain		37.600771°N 0.980048°W			
Corduba	Córdoba	Spain		37.884140°N 4.788804°W			
Emerita Augusta	Mérida	Spain	end of 1st century BC	38.915956°N 6.337893°W	125 x 100	Mérida amphitheatre	
Emporiae	Empúries	Spain	2nd century AD	42.1301°N 3.11741°E?			
Forum Municipii Flavii Caparensis	Cáparra	Spain		40.1643°N 6.09997°W			
Italica	Itálica	Spain	2nd century AD	37.443816°N 6.046670°W	157 x 134	Roman amphitheatre of Italica	
Ituci	Torreparedones	Spain		37.753033°N 4.380938°W			
Legio	León	Spain		42.596771°N 5.569479°W			
Segobriga	Saelices	Spain		39.8860°N 2.8140°W			
Sisapo	Almodovar del Campo	Spain		38.6463°N 4.51827°W		Excavation began in 2009	
Tarraco	Tarragona	Spain	2nd century AD	41.114547°N 1.258817°E	130 x 102	Tarragona Amphitheatre	
Toletum	Toledo	Spain		39.865253°N 4.022921°W			
Ucubi	Espejo	Spain		37.684166°N 4.554315°W			
Augusta Raurica	Augst	Switzerland		47.529313°N 7.720602°E			
Aventicum	Avenches	Switzerland		46.881003°N 7.042657°E			
Brenodurum (?)	Bern	Switzerland		46.975758°N 7.451130°E		Engehalbinsel	
Julia Equestris	Nyon	Switzerland		46.383451°N 6.241263°E			
Octodurum	Martigny	Switzerland		46.094365°N 7.073460°E			
Vindonissa	Windisch	Switzerland		47.476249°N 8.213603°E			
Bosra		Syria		32.517922°N 36.479872°E			
Dura Europos		Syria	3rd century AD	34.749855°N 40.728926°E		Small amphitheatre primarily built for the soldiers there. Remains destroyed by ISIS.	
Agbia		Tunisia					
Acholla		Tunisia		35.0762°N 11.0188°E			
Avitta Bibba		Tunisia		36°24'35.5"N 9°42'16.5"E			
Bararus		Tunisia		35.211842°N 10.791201°E			
Belalis Maior	Hr. el Faouar	Tunisia					
Bulla Regia		Tunisia		36.560414°N 8.757769°E			
Carpis		Tunisia					
Carthago	Carthage	Tunisia		36.856336°N 10.314921°E	156 x 128	Carthage amphitheatre	
Girba	Djerba	Tunisia		33.685822°N 10.913907°E			
Colonia Julia Aurelia Commoda	Thuburbo Majus	Tunisia		36.398212°N 9.905750°E			
Hadrumentum	Sousse	Tunisia		35.826°N 10.64°E			
	Jebel Moraba	Tunisia		36.597628°N 9.860814°E			
	Ksar Hellal	Tunisia					
Limisa	Ksar Lemsa	Tunisia		36.034857°N 9.693440°E			
Leptis Minor		Tunisia		35.678313°N 10.866518°E			
Mactaris	Maktar	Tunisia		35.855562°N 9.206366°E			
Municipium Aurelium Commodum	Henchir Bou Cha	Tunisia		36.5277°N 9.88918°E			
Pheradi Maius	Bouficha	Tunisia		36.250003°N 10.397047°E			
Pupput	Hammamet, Tunisia	Tunisia		36.4°N 10.616667°E			
Seressi	Oum El Abouab	Tunisia		36.163516°N 9.775575°E			
Sicca Veneria	El Kef	Tunisia		36.186°N 8.7°E			
Simitthus	Chemtou	Tunisia		36.490397°N 8.580217°E		Map of Simitthus Photograph	
Sufetula	Sbeitla	Tunisia		35.243627°N 9.114540°E		Map of Sufetula	
Thaddur	Henchir el-Kelkh	Tunisia		36.471845, 9.723565			
Thaenae		Tunisia		34.655531°N 10.673080°E			
Thapsus		Tunisia		35.619145°N 11.042257°E			
Thibaris		Tunisia		36.504680°N 9.081555°E			
Thignica	Ain Tounga	Tunisia		36.527815°N 9.361791°E			
Thimisua	Argoub	Tunisia		36.310720°N 9.319186°E			
Thizica	Henchir Techga	Tunisia		36°58'22.0"N 9°40'52.0"E			
Thuburbo Minus	Tebourba	Tunisia		36.829485°N 9.841089°E		The amphitheatre here was destroyed at the end of the 17th century during the construction of a bridge.Herbermann, Charles, ed. (1913). "Thuburbo Minus" . Catholic Encyclopedia. New York: Robert Appleton Company.	
Thugga	Dougga	Tunisia		36.4242°N 9.21733°E			
Thysdrus	El Djem	Tunisia	3rd century	35.2964°N 10.7069°E	148 x 122	Amphitheatre of El Jem	
Uchi Maius		Tunisia		36.4123°N 9.08526°E			
Ulissipira		Tunisia		35.958633°N 10.441163°E			
Upenna	Enfida	Tunisia		36.133958°N 10.377445°E		Nothing now remains of Upenna amphitheatre.	
Uthina	Oudna	Tunisia		36.608681°N 10.169365°E	113 × 90		
Utica		Tunisia		37.052482°N 10.057350°E		2 amphitheatres	
Anazarbus		Turkey		37.244079°N 35.894983°E			
Antioch on the Orontes	Antakya	Turkey		Uncertain			
Cyzicus		Turkey		40.398365°N 27.884499°E			
Mastaura (Caria)		Turkey		37.956332°N 28.341756°E			
Pergamon	Bergama	Turkey		39.125747°N 27.174432°E		Map	
Isca Augusta	Caerleon	Wales		51.608056°N 2.956889°W		Caerleon amphitheatre	
Moridunum	Carmarthen	Wales		51.862004°N 4.296705°W			
	Tomen y Mur	Wales		52.931914°N 3.923463°W		near Llan Ffestiniog	
Venta Silurum	Caerwent	Wales		51.612381°N 2.766406°W			

== See also ==
- Roman architecture
- Circus (building)
- Arena
- Stadium
- Arenas of Besançon

Related modern building structures

- List of contemporary amphitheatres
- List of association football stadiums by capacity
- List of indoor arenas
- List of stadiums
