= Amphitheater of Nero =

Ancient Roman amphitheater in Rome

Coordinates: 41.8954°N 12.4737°E

- Shown in ancient Rome
- Click on the map for a fullscreen view
- Location: Rome

History
- Built: Regio IX Circus Flaminius Campus Martius AD 64

The Amphitheater of Nero was a wooden amphitheater built by the Roman emperor Nero around 64 AD.

== Location ==
The amphitheater was situated on the Campus Martius, though its exact location remains unknown. Originally, it was thought to have been constructed on the site of the demolished amphitheater of Statilius Taurus, but it now seems more likely that it was built near the demolished amphitheater of Caligula to the north of the Saepta Julia.

== History ==
According to historian Tacitus, work began on the amphitheater in 57 AD, the year of Nero's second consulship with Lucius Calpurnius Piso. Others argue that it was built after the Great Fire of Rome in 64 since Nero wanted to replace the amphitheater of Statilius Taurus, then the only stone amphitheater in Rome, which had been destroyed in the fire. It took only a year to complete and Nero held gladiatorial battles to inaugurate it. According to Suetonius' Life of Nero (XII, 2–3): "at the gladiatorial fights which he [Nero] gave in a wooden amphitheatre, built on the Campus Martius in less than a year, nobody was left to kill, even criminals. But he made 400 senators and 600 Roman equestrians fight". However, the building's wooden construction meant it did not last long and was probably destroyed in the fire of 80.

== Description ==
Accounts of the amphitheater describe it as modestly sized and constructed entirely out of wood.

== See also ==
- List of Roman amphitheatres

== Sources ==
- Samuel Ball Platner and Thomas Ashby, A topographical dictionary of Ancient Rome, Oxford University Press, 1929
