= Conca del Naviglio =

Coordinates: 45°27′25″N 9°10′43″E

- Quartiere of Milan
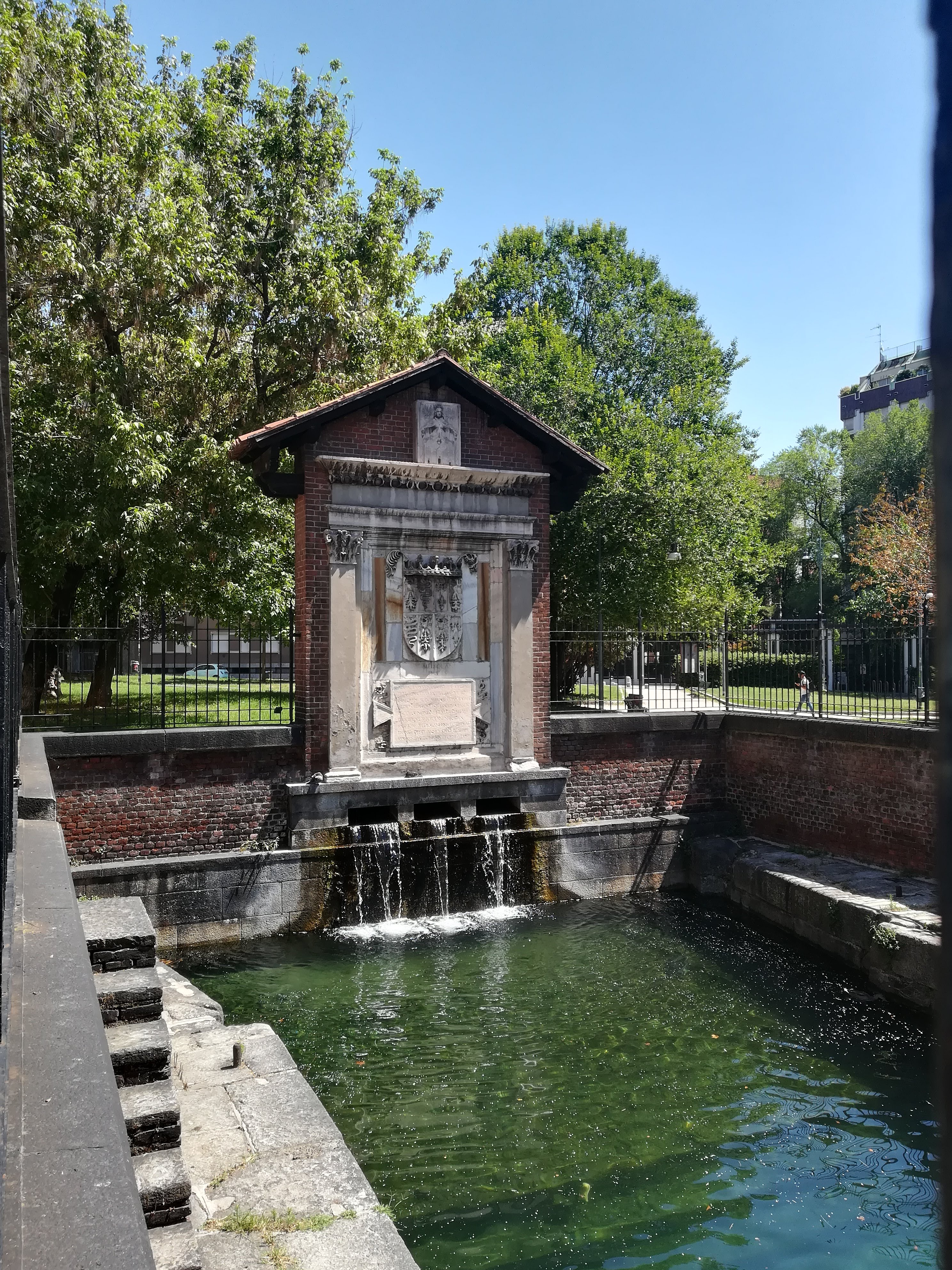
- The Conca di Viarenna in Via Conca del Naviglio
- Interactive map of Conca del Naviglio
- Country: Italy
- Region: Lombardy
- Province: Milan
- Zone: 1
- Time zone: UTC+1 (CET)
  - Summer (DST): UTC+2 (CEST)

Conca del Naviglio is a district ("quartiere") of Milan, Italy, part of the Zone 1 of Milan. It preserves the remains of the basin and some remains of the Milan amphitheatre. The urban fabric originated around the creation of the Conca di Viarenna in the 15th century.

== History ==
The construction of a new basin (i.e. a "closed", i.e. a hydraulic engineering work aimed at overcoming the height difference imposed by the shape of the land), called Conca di Viarenna, was necessary to connect the dock, then Naviglio Grande and Naviglio Pavese, with the internal pit, allowing it to overcome the difference in height. The basin was completed in 1439 and was used to make it easier to transport the blocks of Candoglia marble, arriving from the Naviglio Grande, as close as possible to the Milan Cathedral, whose construction with marble began in 1386-1387 following the gift of Gian Galeazzo Visconti. Until then, the arrival of the material took place at the pond of Sant'Eustorgio (near the homonymous basilica), from which it was transported by road. Residues of the Conca di Viarenna are still visible in the first stretch of Via Conca del Naviglio (formed by the merging of two streets, Via Vallone and Via Olocati).

Also known as "Conca della Fabbrica", with obvious reference to the Duomo factory, the basin was then demolished by Ferrante Gonzaga to make room for the ramparts, and again built around the mid 16th century. The construction was completed in 1558 and the fifteenth-century tombstones in the newsstand are still visible as evidence of the basin.
