= Amphitheatre (London) =

Ancient Roman amphitheater in London

Coordinates: 51°30′56″N 0°05′29″W

Roman amphitheatre
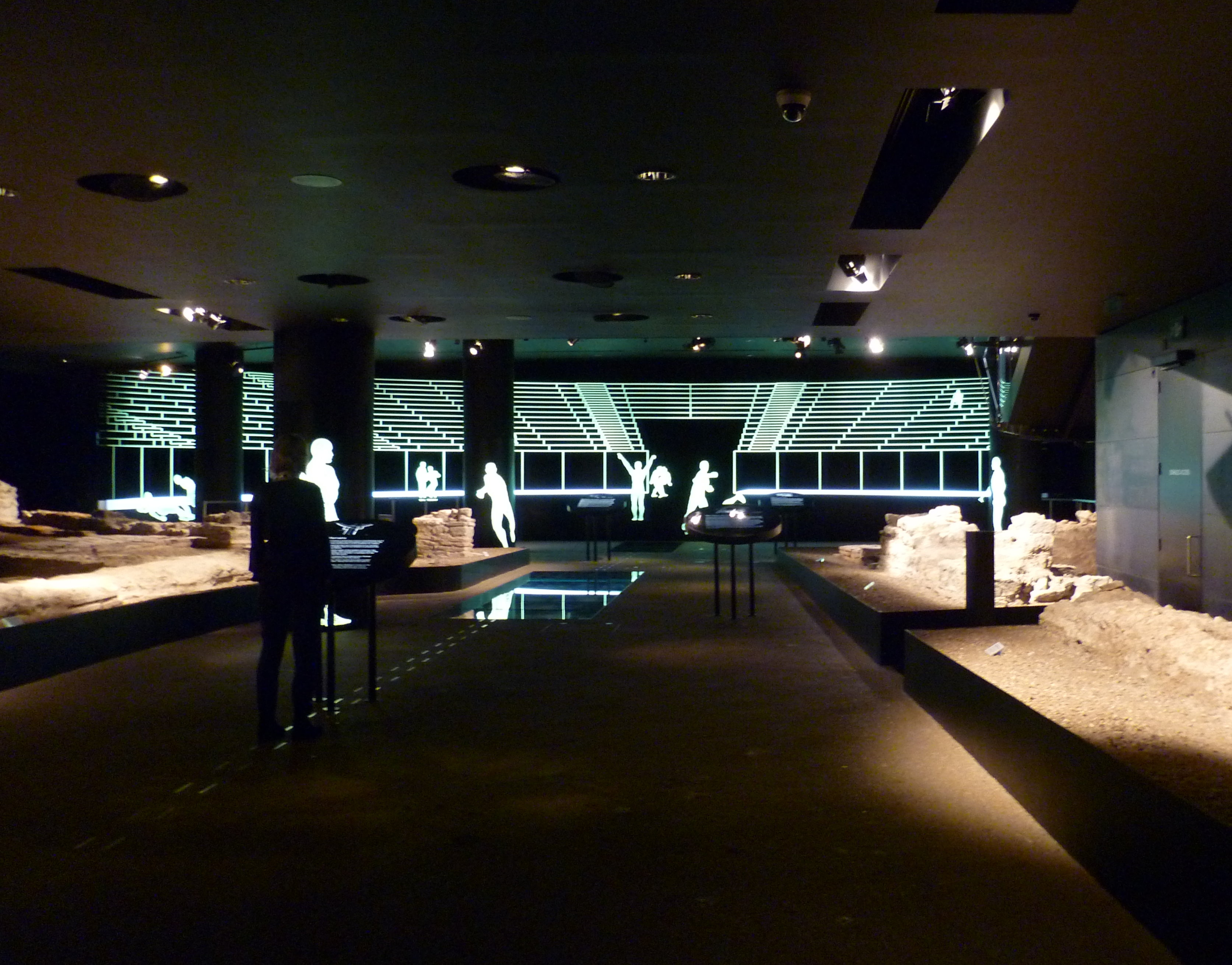
- The Roman amphitheatre below the Guildhall Art Gallery in the City of London
- Interactive map of Roman amphitheatre
- Location: City of London, England, United Kingdom
- Built: AD 70
- Governing body: English Heritage

Scheduled monument
- Official name: Roman amphitheatre, Guildhall Yard
- Designated: 23 July 1990
- Reference no.: 1013411

The visible remains of an amphitheatre constructed during Roman London lie beneath Guildhall Yard in the City of London. Some of these remains are displayed in situ in a room in the basement of the Guildhall Art Gallery complex. Discovered in 1988, the site is now a scheduled monument.

Londinium c.400 AD, showing the location of the amphitheatre near the southeast corner of the Roman fort at top left

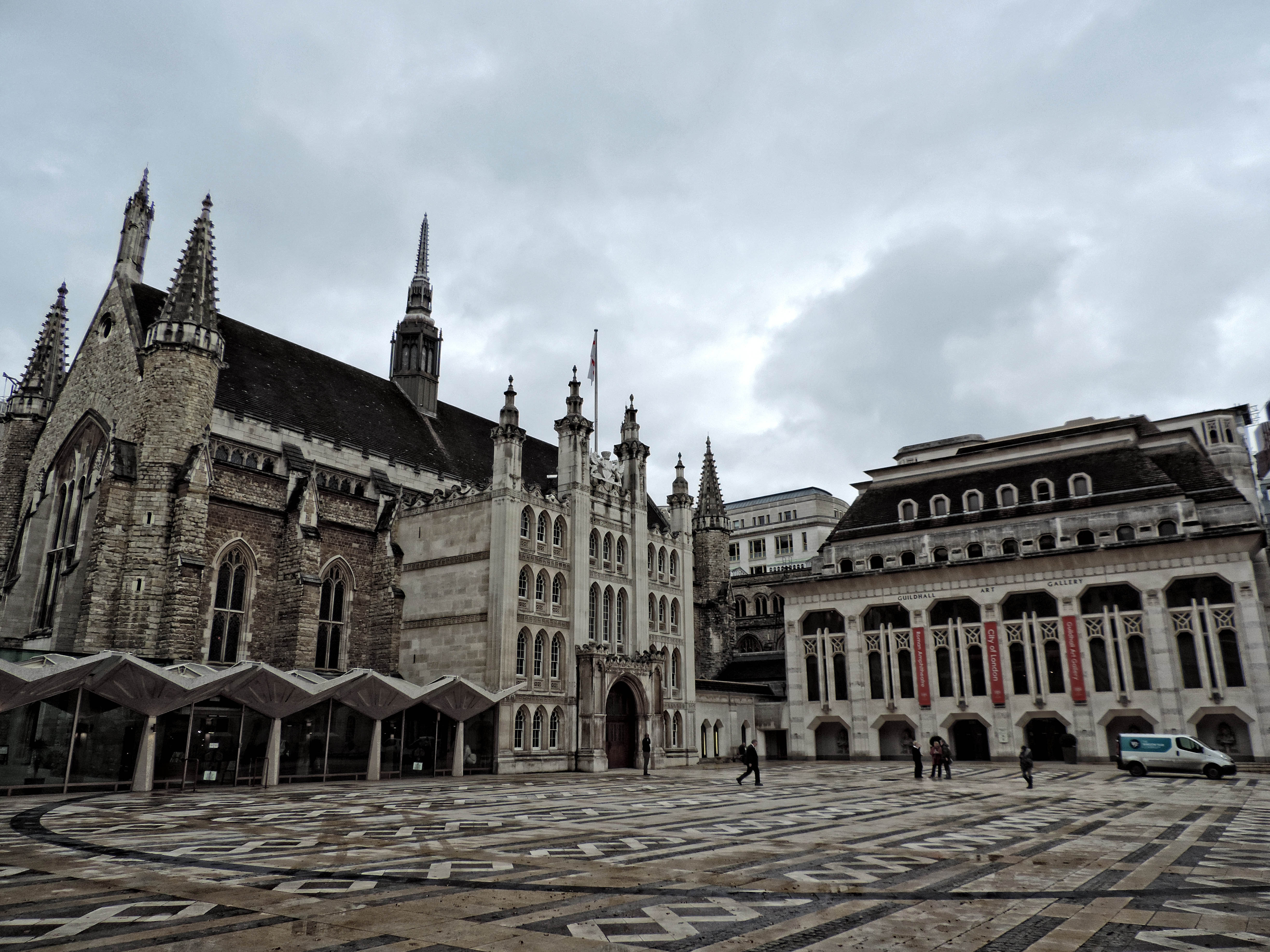
The elliptical band of dark stone on Guildhall Yard marks out the perimeter of the amphitheatre beneath the plaza

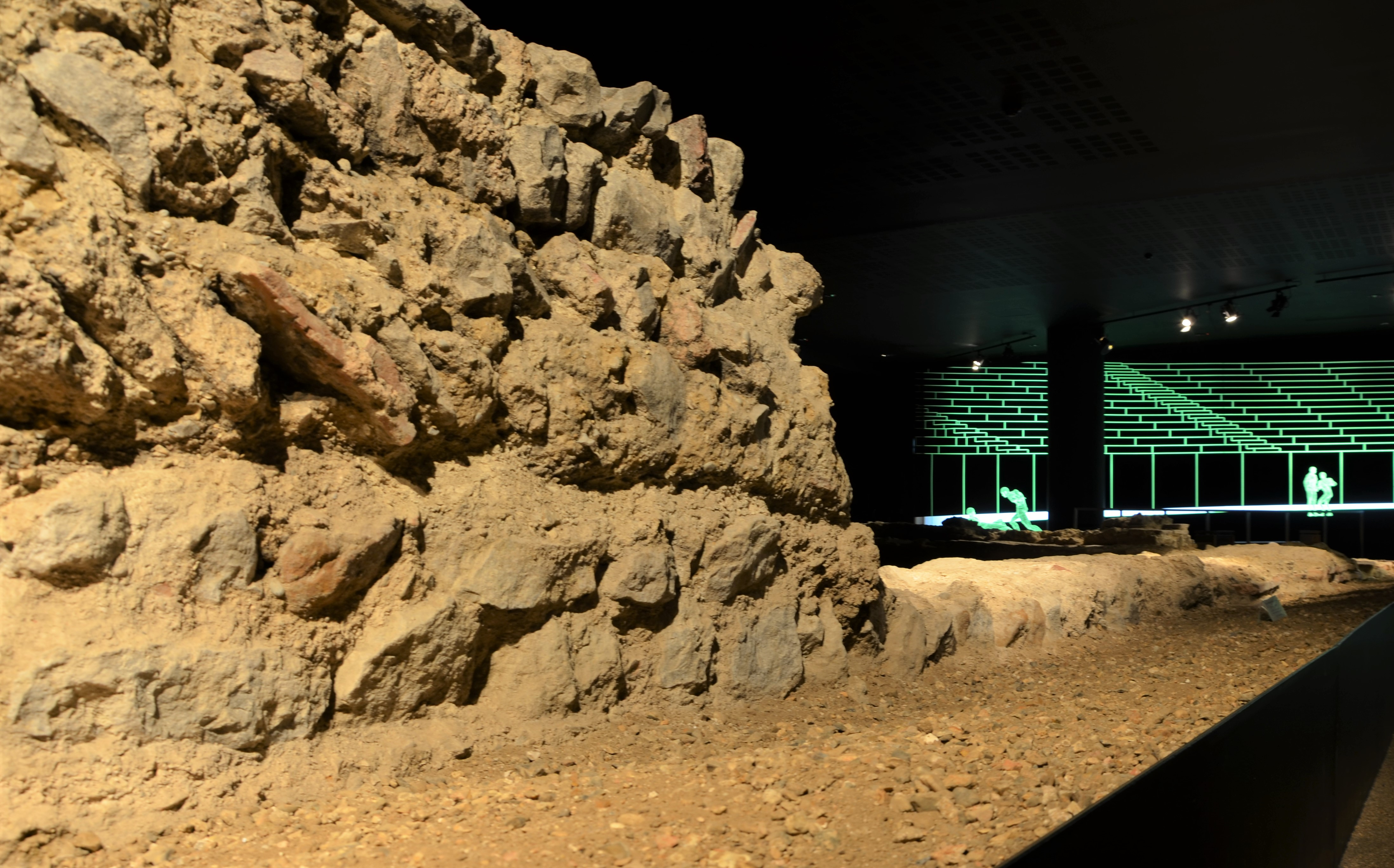
A section of the amphitheatre wall

London's first Roman amphitheatre was built in AD 70 from wood, but was renovated in the early 2nd century with tiled entrances and rag-stone walls. The amphitheatre was used for various public events such as gladiator games, entertaining soldiers and the public with animal fighting and public execution of criminals, as well as religious activities. After the ancient Romans left in the early 5th century, the amphitheatre lay derelict for hundreds of years.

In the 11th century the area was reoccupied and by the 12th century the first London Guildhall was built next to it, which survives despite the Great Fire of London and The Blitz. Various other buildings were constructed around the site of the amphitheatre, which eventually became the public plaza of Guildhall Yard seen today. The formal entrance to Guildhall Yard included a gatehouse built in the 13th century, sited directly over the southern entrance to the Roman amphitheatre. The church of St Lawrence Jewry, on the south side of Guildhall Yard, is built on an irregular alignment which may have been intended to shadow the elliptical form of the amphitheatre.

The Guildhall Art Gallery, on the northern side of the plaza, was completed in 1999, the basement of which provides access to an excavated section of the Roman-era remains. The perimeter of the amphitheatre is marked at surface level on Guildhall Yard by a band of dark stone.

== See also ==
- List of Roman amphitheatres
