= Milan amphitheatre =

Ancient Roman amphitheater in Milan

Coordinates: 45°27′26.74″N 9°10′43.44″E

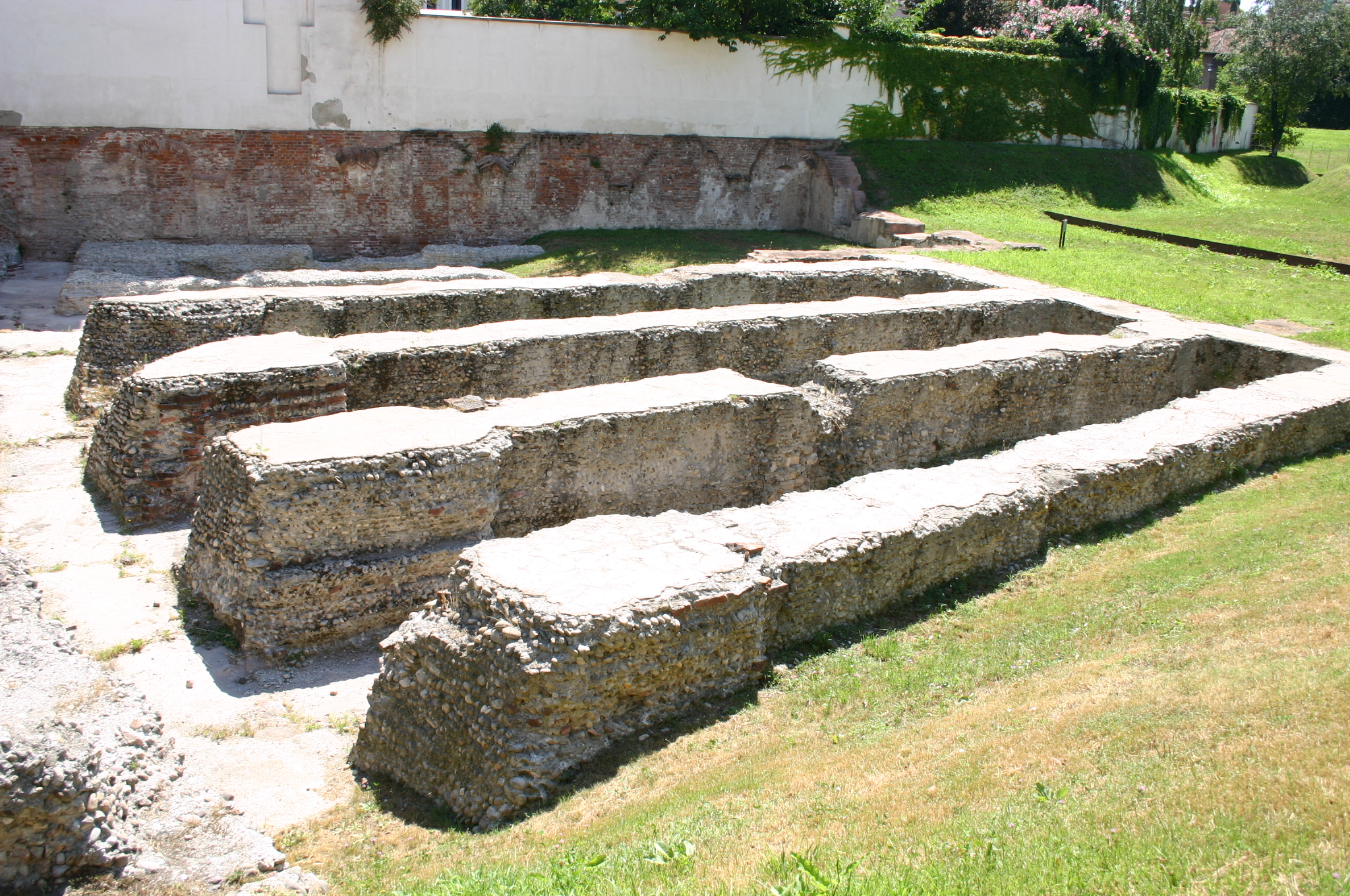
Remains of the amphitheatre of Milan

The Milan amphitheatre was a Roman amphitheatre in the ancient city of Mediolanum, the modern Milan in Northern Italy.

== History ==
The amphitheatre was built near the Porta Ticinese in the 2nd–3rd centuries AD, when Mediolanum grew as economical and political importance while Rome declined. It remained in use until the city was one of the capitals of the Western Roman Empire (4th or 5th centuries). Later it was abandoned after Christianity imposed an end to arena games, but also as, in the wake of the imperial crisis, animals to be used in the amphitheatre were no longer imported. It became a quarry for construction stones as early as the 4th century AD, when the Basilica of San Lorenzo was built.

The edifice was demolished during a barbarian attack on Milan, as it was located outside the walls and could therefore be used as stronghold by the attackers. The date of the event is uncertain, however: it could be 402, during the Visigothic invasion of Italy, or in 452, when northern Italy was ravaged by Attila, or during the Gothic Wars (6th century).

== Structure ==
The scanty remains of the amphitheatre have, however, allowed the archaeologists to calculate that it was 129.5 metres (425 ft) long and 109.3 metres (359 ft) wide. The arena measured 71 by 41 metres (233 ft × 135 ft).

== See also ==
- List of Roman amphitheatres

== Sources ==
- Ceresa Mori, Anna (1985). La basilica di San Lorenzo a Milano.
