= Amphitheater of Statilius Taurus =

Ancient Roman amphitheater in Rome

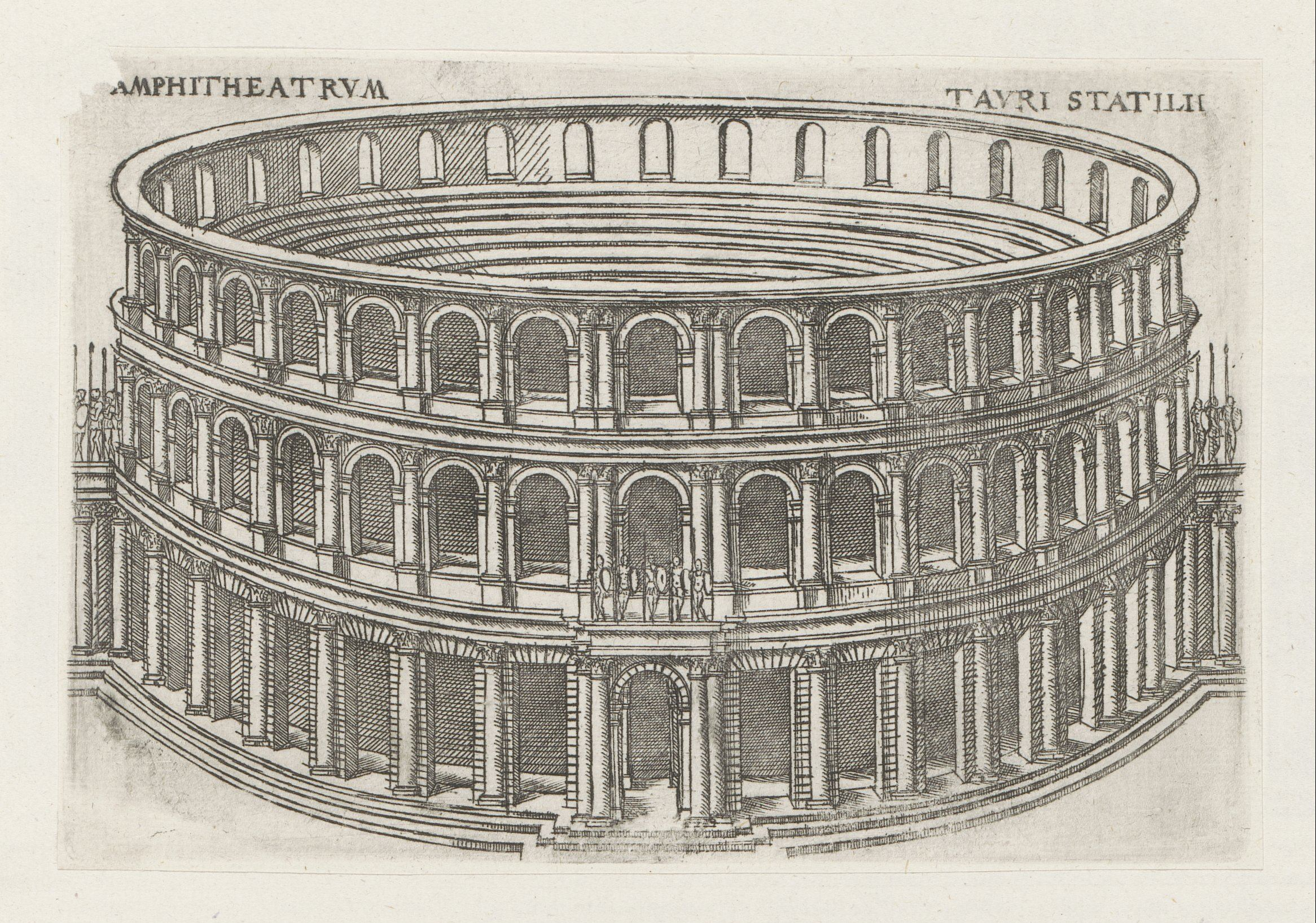
- Reconstruction drawing in Livre des edifices antiques romains (1584) by Jacques I Androuet du Cerceau

- Location in ancient Rome
- Click on the map for a fullscreen view
- 41°54′00″N 12°28′11″E
- Type: Roman amphitheatre
- Location: Regione IX Circus Flaminius

History
- Built: 29 BC
- Built by: Titus Statilius Taurus

The Amphitheater of Statilius Taurus (Latin: Amphitheatrum Statilii Tauri) was a Roman amphitheater in ancient Rome. The amphitheater was inaugurated in 29 BC. Earlier arenas were temporary structures that were disassembled after the event. The amphitheater was built by Titus Statilius Taurus, who paid for it from his own resources. Statilius Taurus was a successful general and politician in the time of Augustus and had gathered much wealth during his career. For the inauguration he also paid for the gladiatorial games.

The amphitheater was built on the Campus Martius in Rome in a period when many new temples and theaters were being built. The exact location is lost, but it was probably built in the southern area of the Campus Martius. Within a 50-year span, this area saw the construction of the Theater of Pompey, the Theater of Marcellus, and the Theater of Balbus, along with the Amphitheater of Statilius Taurus.

It was not a large amphitheater. Dissatisfaction over the Amphitheater of Statilius Taurus led Nero, in 57 AD, to build a new wooden amphitheater, the Amphitheater of Nero. During the Great Fire of Rome in 64 AD, which left Rome in ashes, both amphitheaters were completely destroyed.

In 72 AD, Vespasian built a new, much larger stone amphitheater in Rome. This was the Amphitheatrum Flavium, today known as the Colosseum.

== See also ==
- List of Roman amphitheatres
