= Thimisua =

Thimisua also known as Sidi-Bou-Argoub is an archaeological site in Tunisia, located at 36.310720°N 9.319186° and which is known for the ampitheter there. This structure is described as oval in shape with two entries and a longitudinal axis.

During the Roman Empire the town of Thmisua was a civitas of Africa Proconsularis. It was down stream from the Municipium of Thabbora and it prospered from 330BC to 640AD. .
