= Roman amphitheatre of Syracuse =

Ancient Roman amphitheater in Syracuse, Italy

Coordinates: 37°04′27″N 15°16′44″E

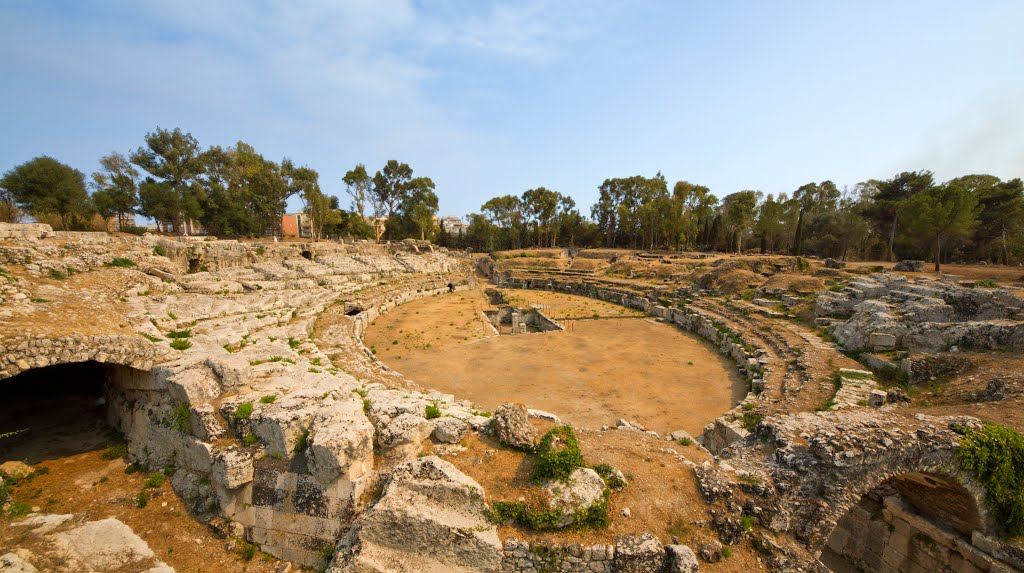
View of the Roman amphitheatre

The Roman amphitheatre of Syracuse is one of the best preserved structures in the city of Syracuse, Sicily, from the early Imperial period.

It is part of the UNESCO World Heritage Site "Syracuse and the Rocky Necropolis of Pantalica", recognized for its outstanding archaeological and historical value since 2005.

== Location ==
The amphitheatre is located in the ancient suburb of Neapolis, in what is now an archaeological park, near the Greek theatre and the Altar of Hieron. The amphitheatre is on a different orientation to these other structures and probably follows the lines of an urban plan developed in the late classical period, which is reflected by the street discovered near the Sanctuary of Demeter in the suburb of Achradina. The main road from Achradina to Neapolis led up to the amphitheatre through an Augustan period triumphal arch, whose foundations are still in situ. Between the arch and the amphitheatre, there was a monumental fountain, fed by a large cistern which has not yet been identified. A separate cistern provided water to the amphitheatre itself; it is preserved under the nearby church of San Nicola.

== Description ==
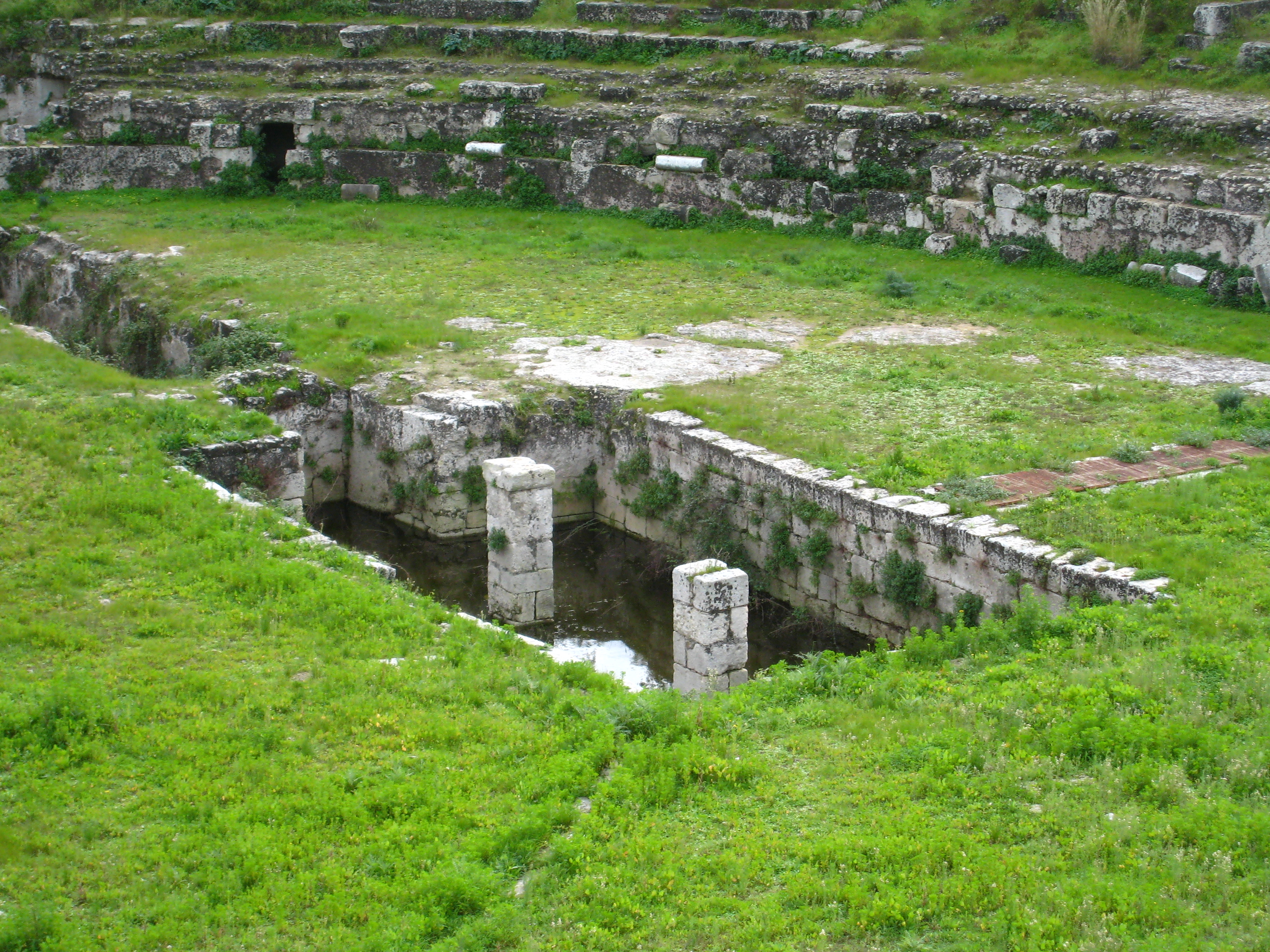
The rectangular pit in the centre of the arena, view from the northeast

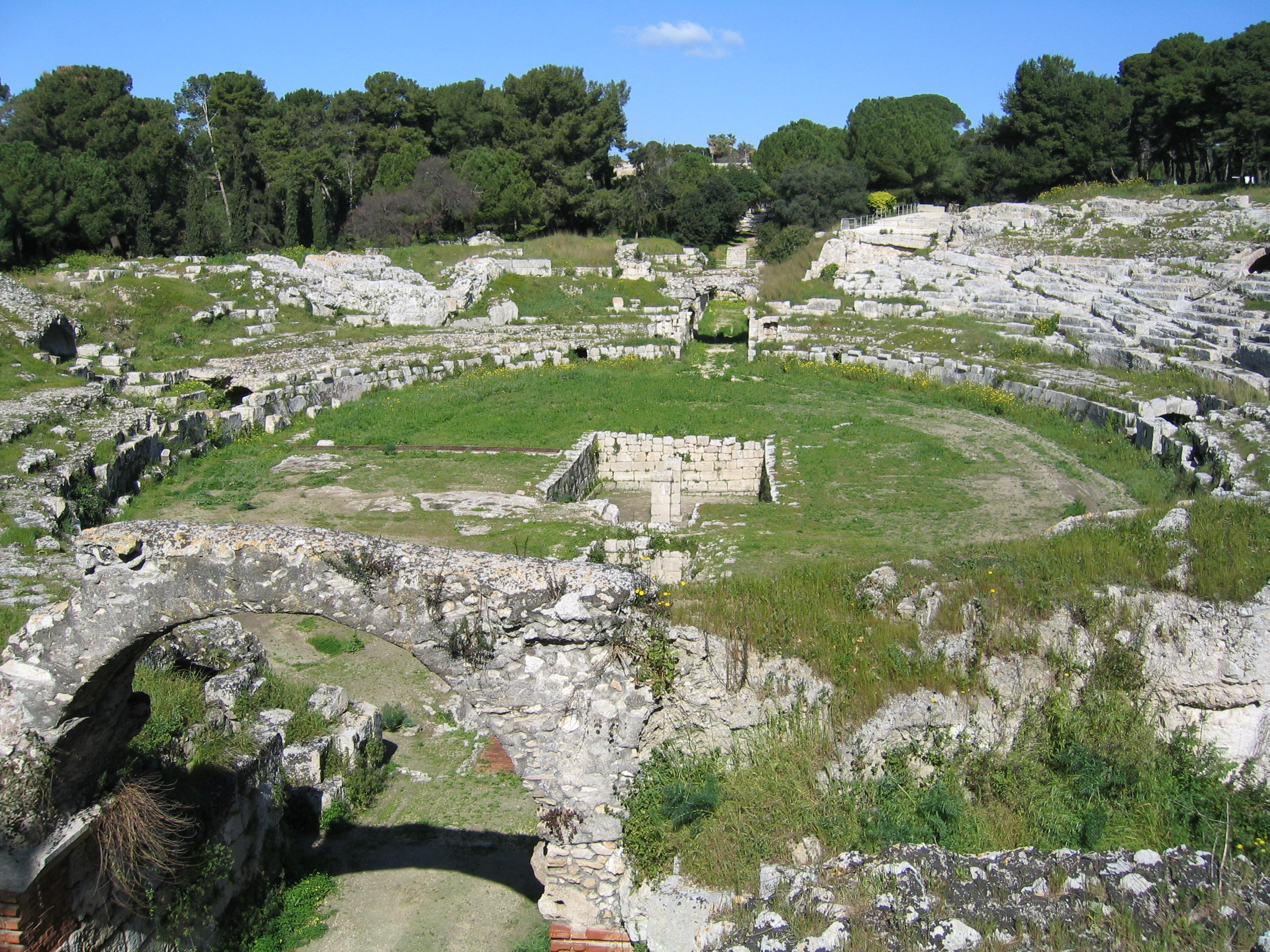
View of the amphitheatre from the south

The amphitheatre is largely excavated out of the living rock and in the north east it takes advantage of the slope of the same rocky outcrop which the Greek theatre is built into. Almost nothing of the superstructure, which was built from masonry, survives.

The structure has monumental dimensions, measuring around 140 metres (460 ft) in length and 119 metres (390 ft) in width.

There were two entrances and a complicated system of steps which led from the upper levels to the exterior. At the centre of the arena there was a rectangular pit, which was originally covered. An underground passage ran from this pit to the entrance at the southern end of the amphitheatre. This pit and passage were necessary for machinery used during the shows. The seating in the cavea is separated from the arena itself by a high platform, under which was a vaulted corridor through which gladiators entered the arena. Above this were the front seats, which were reserved for high ranking individuals. The inscriptions carved on the blocks of the railing were edited by Gentili and seem to have been intended to indicate the different seating areas.

Higher up, there are another two covered walkways running around the entire arena under the seating, while a third walkway ran around the top of the monument and may have had a colonnaded portico running around the top of it. From these circular walkways, a series of radial passages allowed access to the various sectors of the cavea.

Four limestone fragments of a monumental inscription still survive from the amphitheatre, which most likely stood above the main entrance at the south end of the arena, according to Gentili. Lugli dates it to the Augustan period, while Golvin gives it a Julio-Claudian date.

The amphitheatre was first excavated in 1839 by Domenico Lo Faso Pietrasanta.

== See also ==
- List of Roman amphitheatres

== Bibliography ==
- Francesca Bottari, Pantalica e Siracusa, Libreria dello Stato, Istituto poligrafico e Zecca dello Stato, 2008
- F. Gringeri Pantano, L. Rubino (ed.), J.-P.-L. Hoüel, Jean Hoüel: voyage a Siracusa: le antichità della città e del suo territorio nel 1777, Palermo 2003.
- G. V. Gentili, "Studi e ricerche su l'anfiteatro di Siracusa," in Palladio, Rivista di storia dell'architettura, n.s., 23, 1973.
- G. Lugli, "L'architettura in Sicilia nell'età ellenistica e romana," in Studi minori di topografia antica, Atti VII Congresso Nazionale di Storia dell'Architettura, Roma 1955, pp. 98–101
- P. Sabbatini Tumolesi, G. L. Gregori, S. Orlandi, M. Fora, Epigrafia anfiteatrale dell'occidente romano, Roma 1988.
- Touring Club Italiano, Sicilia, Milano 1989.
- O. Belvedere, "Opere pubbliche ed edifici per lo spettacolo nella Sicilia di età imperiale," in Aufstieg und Niedergang der römischen Welt, H. Temporini ed. Berlino - New York 1988, pp. 353–357;
- R.J.A. Wilson, Sicily under the Romain Empire. The archaeology of a Roman Province, 36 B.C. - A.D. 535, Warminster 1990, pp. 81–83.
- F. Coarelli - M. Torelli, Sicilia, Bari 1992, pp. 257–258
- F. Buscemi, "Architettura e romanizzazione nella Sicilia di età imperiale: gli anfiteatri," ASS, III, XXI (2007), pp. 7–53
