= Roman amphitheatre of Italica =

Ancient Roman amphitheater in Santiponce, Spain

- Anfiteatro romano de Itálica (Spanish)
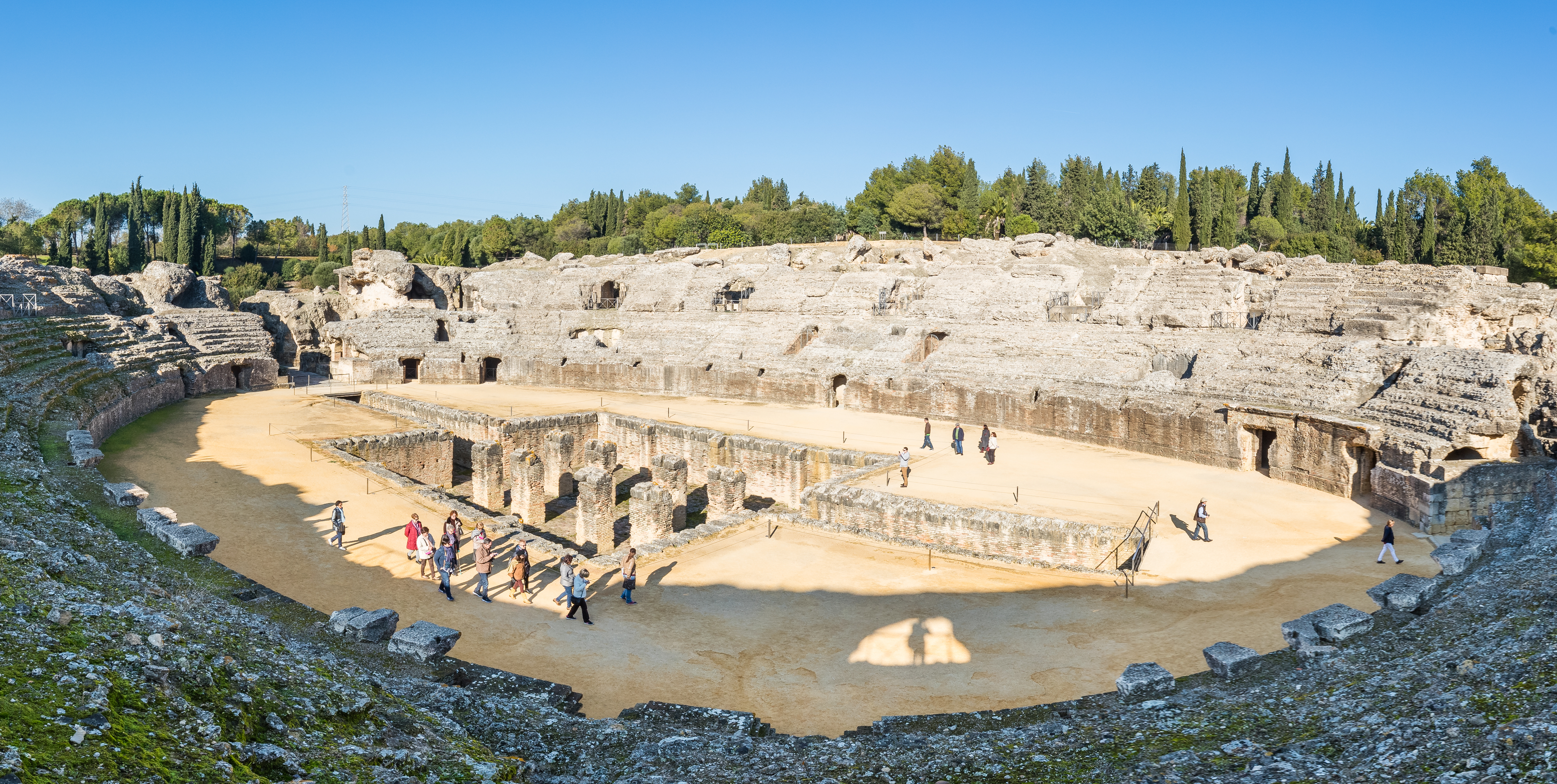
- View of the amphitheatre

- Location within Spain
- 37°26′38″N 6°02′48″W
- Type: Roman amphitheatre
- Periods: Roman Empire
- Location: Santiponce (Seville), Spain

History
- Built: AD 117 and 138

The Roman amphitheatre of Italica is a Roman amphitheatre in the Roman colonia of Italica –in present-day Santiponce (Seville), Spain–, in the Roman province of Hispania Baetica. Built during the reign of emperor Hadrian (who was born in Italica), approximately between the years AD 117 and 138, it was one of the largest in the entire Roman Empire with a capacity of 25,000 spectators. It was used for gladiatorial fights and combats between beasts or men and beasts during ancient Rome.

Italica was largely abandoned by the Romans in the 3rd century. It was rediscovered during the Renaissance, in the 17th century, and work to unearth the amphitheatre began in the late 19th century. The amphitheatre, currently in ruins, is a tourist site offering visitor tours.

== Architectural features ==
The amphitheatre had capacity of 25,000 spectators. It has an elliptical shape, with a major axis of 160 metres (525 ft) and minor axis of 137 metres (449 ft), it had three levels of stands, of which the first remains intact, the second partially so, and the third mostly in ruin. Under the level of the old wooden floor of the amphitheater there was a service pit for the different gladiatorial shows and fights against wild beasts, called venatio. The building was constructed using siliceous and calcareous pebbles, as a result of a shortage of natural stone in the region.

The amphitheatre's cavea was divided into three sections, the ima, media and summa cavea, separated by annular corridors called praecinctions. The first, the ima cavea, had 6 stands, with 8 access doors, and was reserved for a ruling class. The second, the media cavea, was intended for the humblest population, had 12 tiers and 14 access doors. The summa cavea, covered by an awning, was reserved only to children and women.

The amphitheatre also had several rooms dedicated to the cult of Nemesis and Juno.

== Popular culture ==
The amphitheatre of Italica was used in the seventh and eighth seasons of Game of Thrones as the Dragonpit of King's Landing.

== Gallery ==
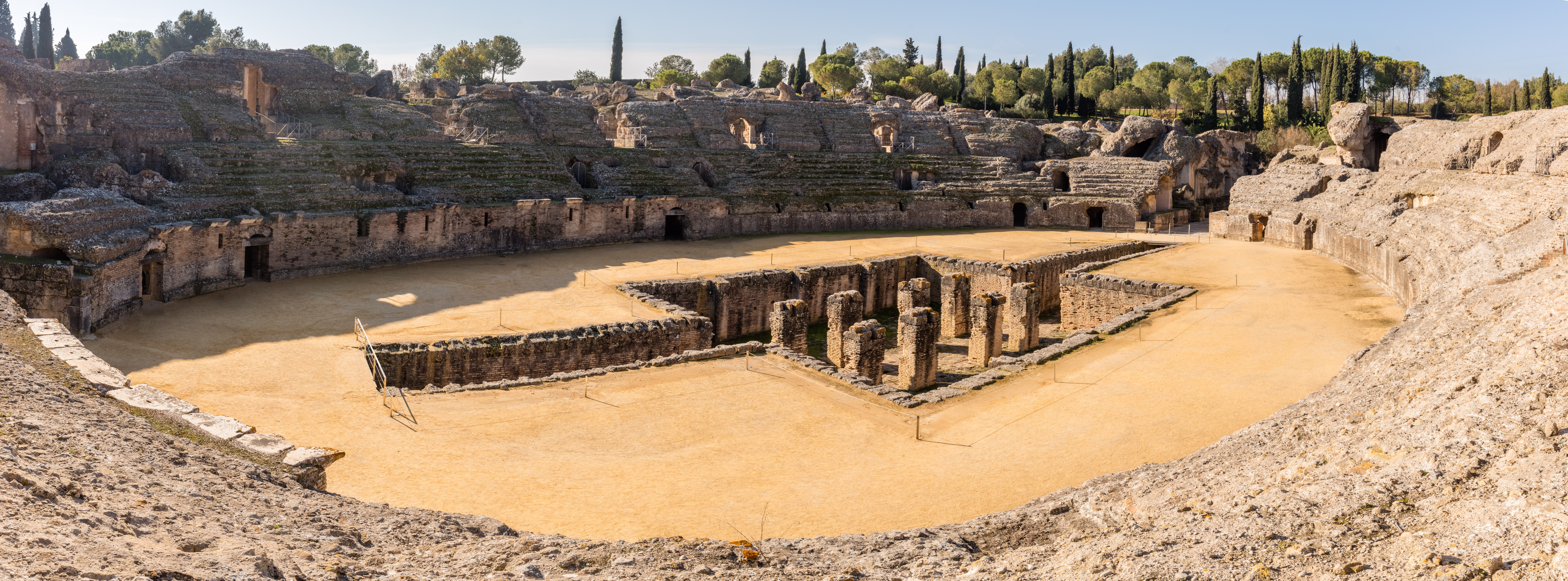
Panoramic of the amphitheatre from the arena.

== See also ==
- List of Roman amphitheatres
- List of Roman sites in Spain
