= Arenas of Besançon =

Ancient Roman amphitheater in Besançon, France

Besançon Amphitheater
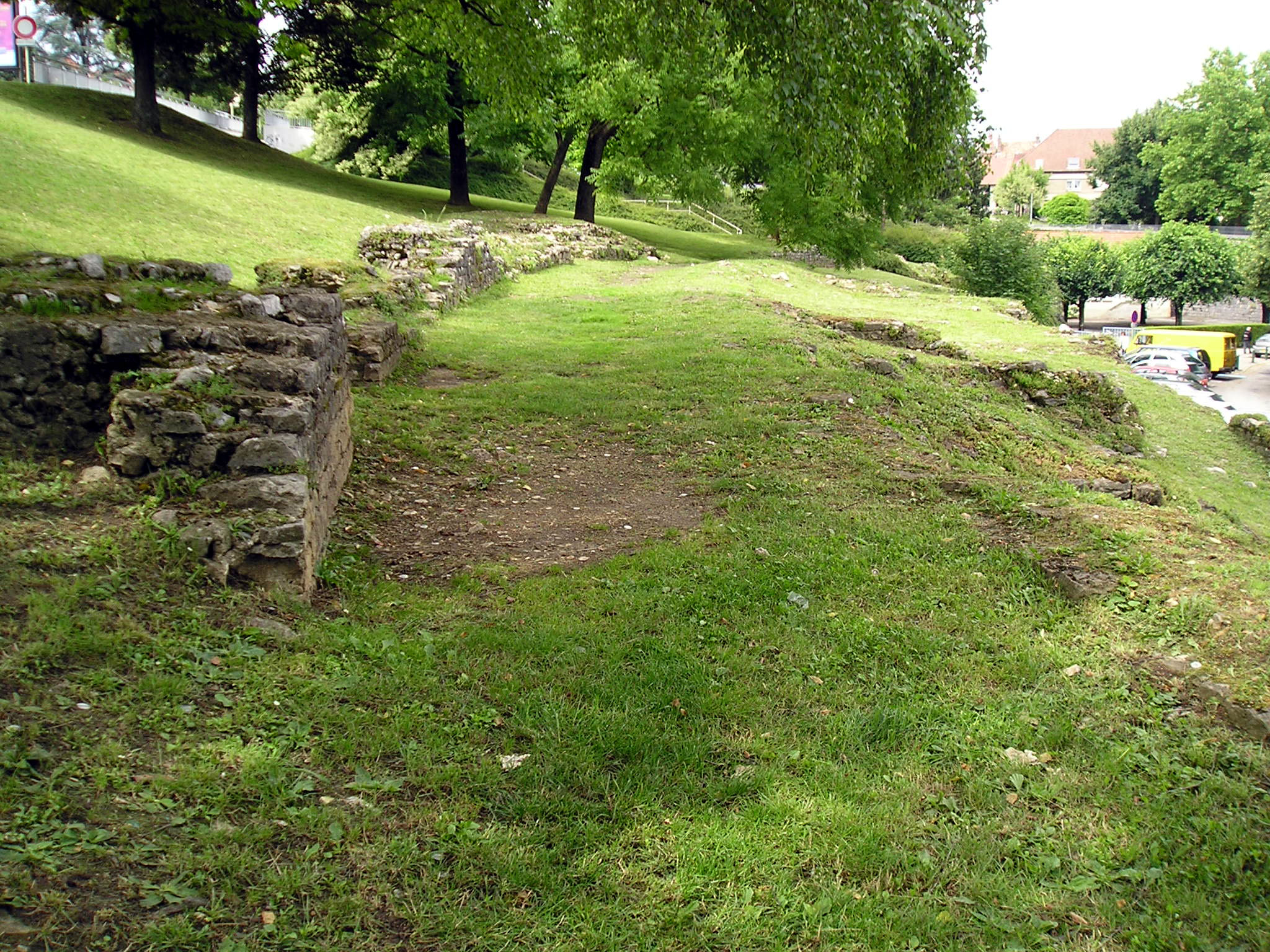
- Remains of the Besançon amphitheater
- Interactive map of Besançon Amphitheater
- Coordinates: 47°14′21″N 6°00′57.5″E
- Visitors: 24,000
- Beginning date: Vesontio (Germania Superior)
- Restored date: 20th century
- Protection: Listed as a historic monument (1927, 1947, ruins, chapel); Registered as a historic monument (2002, ruins)

The arenas of Besançon are the remains of a Roman amphitheater built in the 1st century in Vesontio, the ancient city that later became Besançon, located in the present-day Doubs department of France.

The amphitheater was built on the opposite bank of the Doubs River from the ancient settlement of Vesontio. Measuring between 122 and 130 meters in length, it was constructed partly on a slope and partly on flat ground, combining features of classical amphitheaters, such as those in Arles and Nîmes, with those of massive amphitheaters, such as those in Amiens and Tours. Abandoned in the 4th century, it was not excavated until the late 19th century. Few remains are visible today. The monument has been listed as a historic monument since 1927.

== Location ==
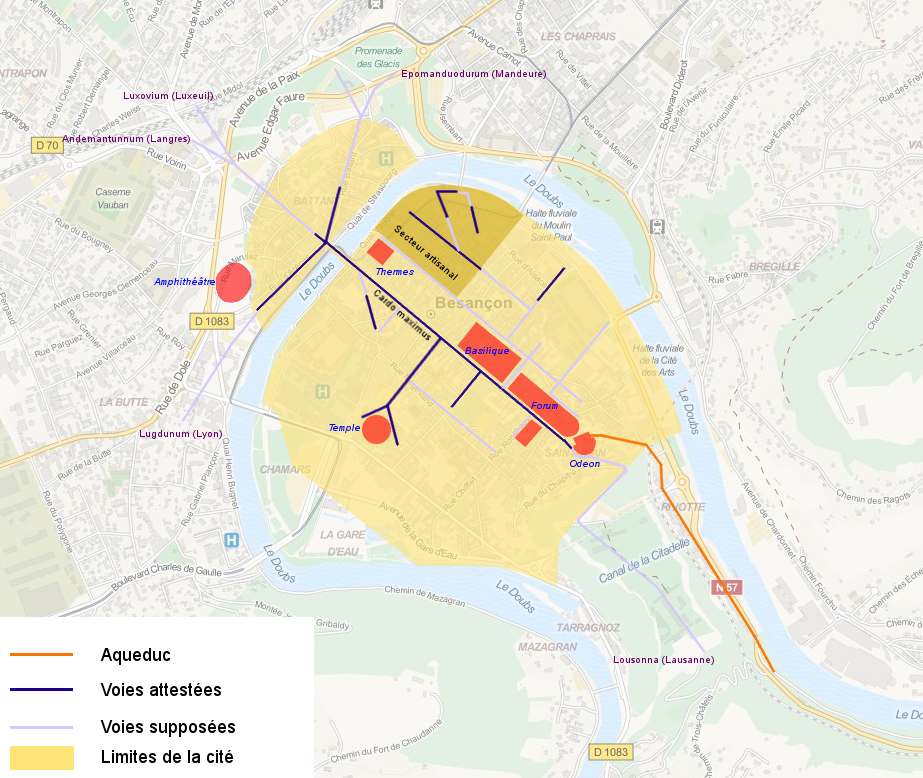
Map of Vesontio.

Location of the amphitheater.

Located in the present-day Battant quarter of Besançon, the amphitheater was situated outside the loop of the Doubs River, where most of the city’s main monuments were concentrated. Its placement has been attributed either to its large size or to possible religious considerations.

The street adjacent to the remains is named Rue d’Arènes, and the surrounding area was at one time referred to as the Quartier des Arènes. The amphitheater is located at the intersection of Rue d’Arènes and Avenue Charles-Siffert.

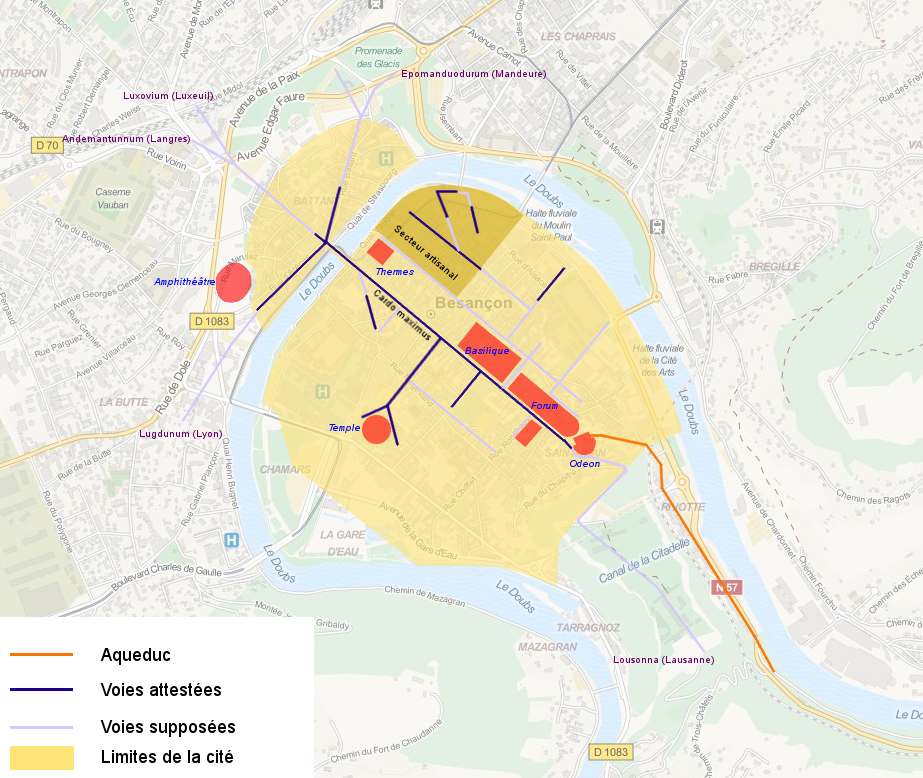
Map of Vesontio.

Location of the amphitheater.

== History ==
The amphitheater was constructed in the second half of the 1st century in an area that was already settled and used for artisanal activities, including metalworking.

By the 4th century, the amphitheater had been abandoned as a venue for spectacles, with part of the structure repurposed as a necropolis and vineyards established on the site.

During the Middle Ages, the amphitheater was used as a source of building material. Stones from the site were incorporated into the construction of the Church of La Madeleine, the 12th-century Saint-Jacques Hospital, Besançon, and Vauban’s fortifications of Besançon, including the Citadel, with some fortifications intersecting or incorporating parts of the monument.

== Characteristics ==
Schematic diagram of the amphitheater.

The amphitheater has an elongated elliptical shape, with dimensions reported between 122 × 104 meters and 130 × 106 meters. Its height is estimated at 21 meters, and its capacity is believed to have been at least 20,000 spectators.

The amphitheater is partially built on flat terrain to the south and east, near the Condé High School, with ramped vault structures, while its northwest section is constructed against the slope of Charmont hill, near Rue Marulaz, forming a partially massive structure similar to those in Trier or Pula. This arrangement results in a façade with two levels of arches on the south and east sides and a single level on the northwest side. Consequently, an annular gallery exists only on the first level, with none at ground level.

The amphitheater’s masonry is primarily composed of rubble stone, with large ashlar blocks used decoratively as facing in the northwest and southwest vomitorium—the only ones identified, corresponding to the short axis of the structure—and on one level of the pilasters framing the façade arches. The northern façade wall rests on a series of large slabs designed to compensate for variations in the ancient ground level. The foundations extend approximately 10 m below the current ground level of Square Marulaz, and the walls are preserved to a height of about one meter.

== Studies, remains, and protection ==
In the 17th century, the amphitheater was known, but its dimensions were uncertain, with the width of the arena estimated at approximately “one hundred and twenty paces.” In 1885, construction in the courtyard of the Condé barracks uncovered remains in the southeast sector, which were excavated by Auguste Castan, who published a brief report. In 1940, additional structures were identified to the northwest during work on a square, but these findings were still insufficient to fully reconstruct the amphitheater’s layout.

In 1995, preventive archaeological excavations were conducted in the courtyard of the Condé High School, which had replaced the former barracks. Carried out by Inrap, the excavations provided additional information on the site’s history, complemented earlier observations, and enabled the production of a plan and elevation of the amphitheater, published in 2006.

The surviving remains of the amphitheater are limited, consisting primarily of a section of the façade wall to the northwest, between Rue Marulaz and Avenue Charles-Siffert. To the southwest, a building of the Condé High School traces the curve of this façade, while grassy terraces north of Square Marulaz mark the perimeter of the arena.

The remains of the Roman arenas and the Saint-Jacques Chapel, located within the former Condé barracks (now the Condé vocational high school), have been classified as historic monuments since April 2, 1927. A section bounded by Avenue Charles-Siffert to the north, Rue Marulaz to the south, the connecting staircase to the east, and the square to the west has been classified since May 28, 1947. All associated remains, including the ground and underlying archaeological features, have been listed since February 12, 2002.

== See also ==
- List of Roman amphitheatres
- Timeline of Besançon

== Bibliography ==
- Cornillot, Lucie; Lerat, Lucien (1943). "L'amphithéâtre romain de Besançon" [The Roman amphitheater in Besançon]. Gallia (in French). I (1): 129–138. doi:10.3406/galia.1943.1952.
