= Oum El Abouab =

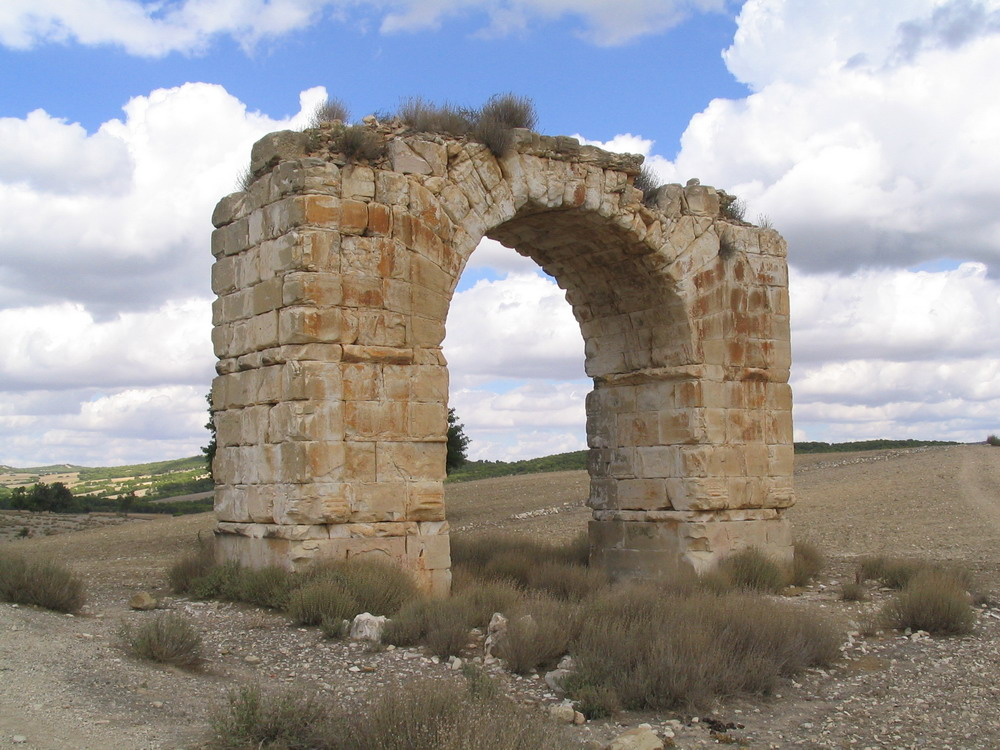
Ruins at Oum al abouab.

Oum El Abouab also known as Seressi is a town in Zaghouan Governorate, Tunisia that is located at 36° 10′ 00″ N, 9° 46′ 20″E. It is at an altitude of 2000m.

During the Roman Empire, Henchir-Oum-el-Abouab was known as Seressi and was a municipium (city) of the Roman Province of Africa Proconsularis and flourished from 30BC to 640AD. Ruins at Oum El Abouab include a forum, unidentified public buildings, a theater and an amphitheater.

The town was the site of a World War II battle during the Tunisia Campaign.
