= Barcelona Roman amphitheatre and circus =

Ancient Roman amphitheater in Barcelona

Coordinates: 41°23′01″N 2°10′55″E

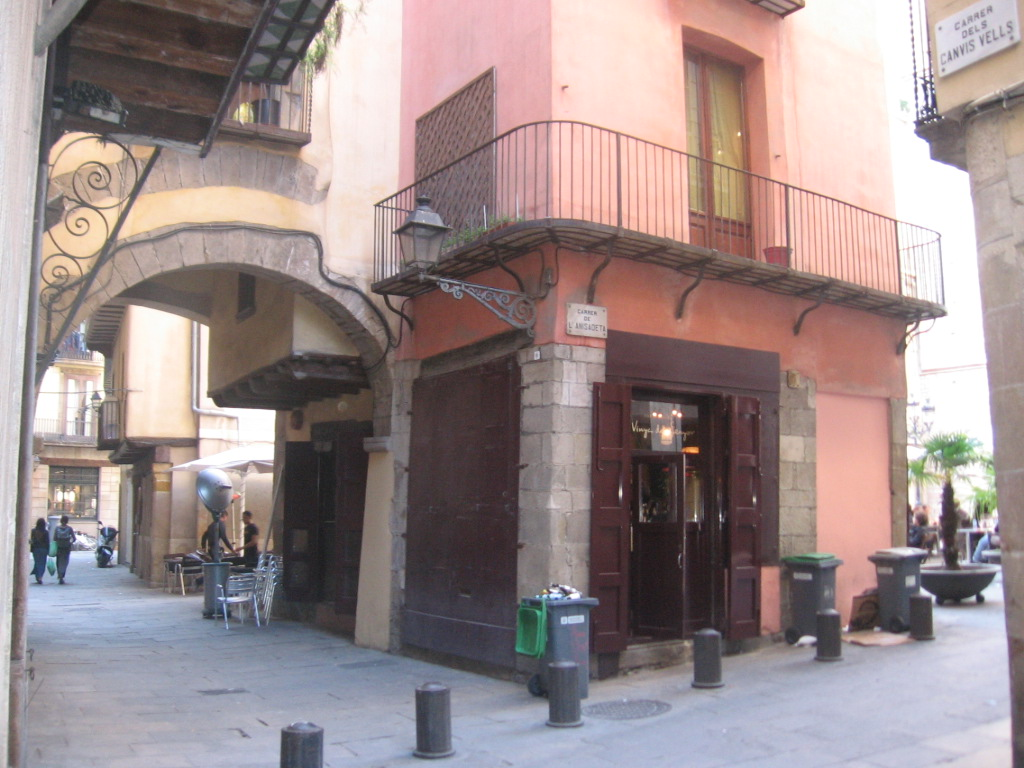
Caputxes street, on the back of the curved building of 7 Santa Maria square. The visible remains of an ancient arch, over a medieval arch, could be the vault of the corridor, under the stairs. The arena remains under the square, to right.

The Barcelona Roman amphitheatre is a disappeared and now invisible Roman amphitheatre in Barcelona, Catalonia, Spain. In addition, it's possible to suppose a Roman circus in another sector of the city.

== Hypothesis ==
The leading proponent of the hypothesis, Spanish archaeologist Jordina Sales, believes that some oval urban structures around the church Santa Maria del Mar, in the Ribera district, may indicate the ground plan. Argenteria street may be the vestige of the Roman via between the porta principalis sinistra, in the Roman wall (at the present, Angel square), and the doors of that amphitheatre. Currently, no solid archaeological or documentary evidence has been found.

== Controversy ==
Recently, another hypothesis has been published. The author believes that the amphitheatre was situated around the church Santa Maria del Pi, on the other side of ancient Barcino. Some of Dr. Sales' reasons are being used now to support an opposite idea. However, the author fails to cite the thesis that he contradicts, as if he were unaware of the earlier idea.

Both the main axis of Santa Maria del Mar church and the axis of Born avenue are parallel. That suggest a possible "fossil" remain of an ancient urban structure. In the Middle Ages, fights between knights took place on this site. If we consider, in addition to this axis, the fossil urbanistic remains that Sales identified in Santa Maria square (an unexplained curved façade) and in Caputxes street (some arches, maybe the remains of the structure of a cavea), one can easily imagine a hypothetical circus possibly extended from Caputxes street to the Rec Comtal canal, under the modern Born market. This estimation is based on a comparison with the dimensions of the Tarragona Amphitheatre.

== Other cases ==
Other notable Roman amphitheatres have been found under built up cities after being lost such as the one under London's Guildhall Art Gallery.

== See also ==
- Roman walls of Barcelona
