= Roman amphitheatre =

Ancient Roman open-air venues

The Colosseum, the largest Roman amphitheatre ever built, and a popular tourist attraction

Roman amphitheatres are large, circular or oval open-air venues with tiered seating built by the ancient Romans. They were used for events such as gladiator combats, venationes (animal slayings) and executions. About 230 Roman amphitheatres have been found across the area of the Roman Empire. Early amphitheatres date from the Republican period, though they became more monumental during the Imperial era.

Amphitheatres are distinguished from circuses and hippodromes, which were usually rectangular and built mainly for racing events, and stadia, built for athletics, but several of these terms have at times been used for one and the same venue. The word amphitheatrum means "theatre all around". Thus, an amphitheatre is distinguished from the traditional semicircular Roman theatres by being circular or oval in shape.

== Components ==
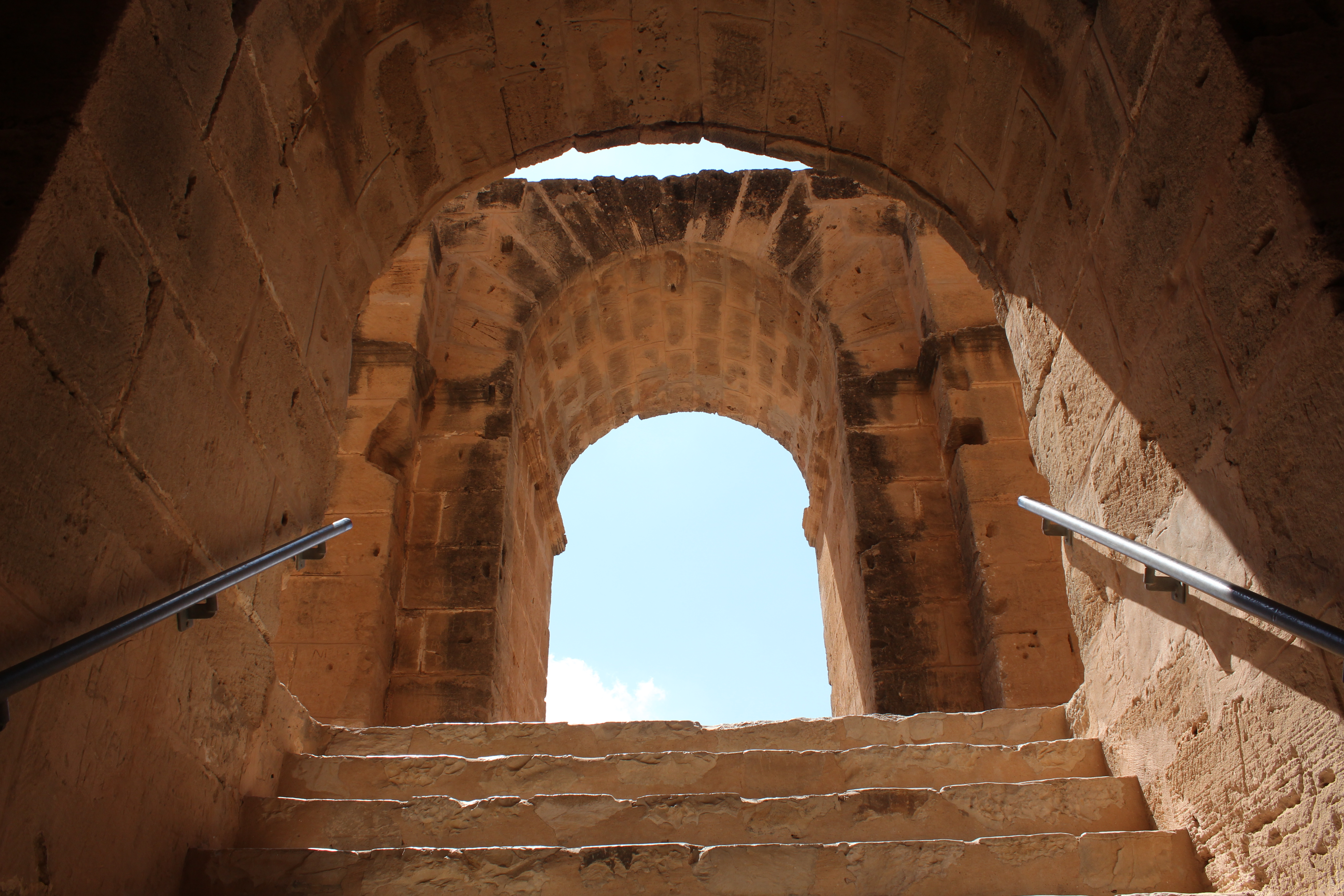
Vomitorium of the Amphitheatre of El Jem, Tunisia

The Roman amphitheatre consists of three main parts: the cavea, the arena, and the vomitorium. The seating area is called the cavea (Latin for "enclosure"). The cavea is formed of concentric rows of stands which are either supported by arches built into the framework of the building, or simply dug out of the hillside or built up using excavated material extracted during the excavation of the fighting area (the arena).

The cavea is traditionally organised in three horizontal sections, corresponding to the social class of the spectators:

- The ima cavea is the lowest part of the cavea and the one directly surrounding the arena. It was usually reserved for the upper echelons of society.
- The media cavea directly follows the ima cavea and was open to the general public, though mostly reserved for men.
- The summa cavea is the highest section and was usually open to women and children.

Similarly, the front row was called the prima cavea and the last row was called the cavea ultima. The cavea was further divided vertically into cunei. A cuneus (Latin for "wedge"; plural, cunei) was a wedge-shaped division separated by the scalae or stairways.

The arched entrances both at the arena level and within the cavea are called the vomitoria (Latin "to spew forth"; singular, vomitorium) and were designed to allow rapid dispersal of large crowds.

== History ==
=== Early amphitheatres ===
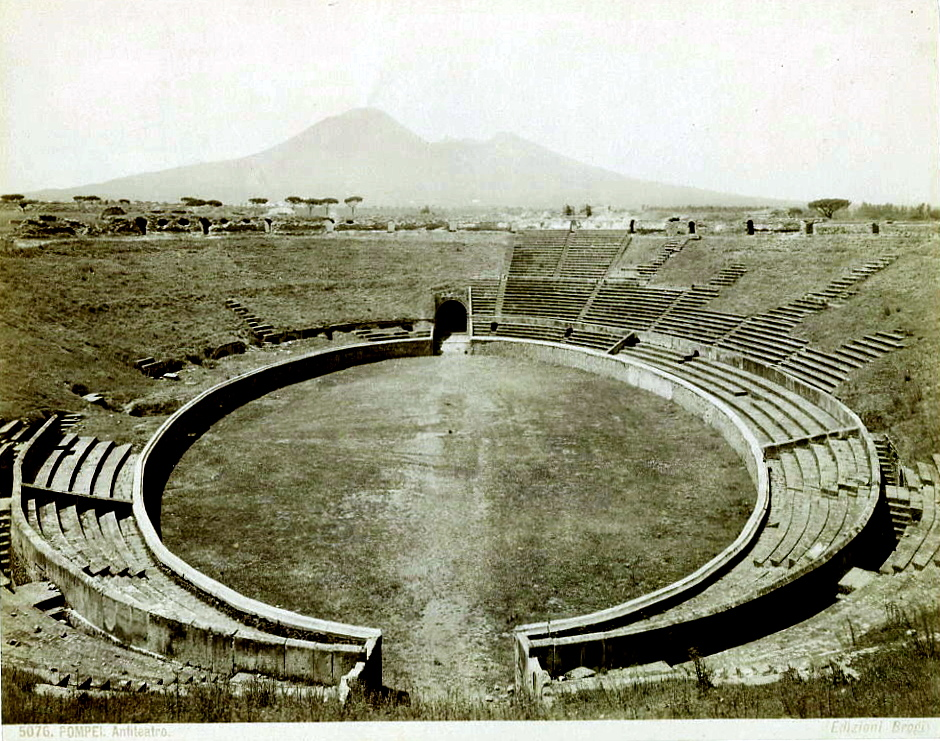
The Amphitheatre of Pompeii in the 1800s, one of the earliest known Roman amphitheatres

It is uncertain when and where the first amphitheatres were built. There are records attesting to temporary wooden amphitheatres built in the Forum Romanum for gladiatorial games from the second century BC onwards, and these may be the origin of the architectural form later expressed in stone. In his Historia Naturalis, Pliny the Elder claims that the amphitheatre was invented during the spectacles of Gaius Scribonius Curio in 53 BC, where two wooden semicircular theatres were rotated towards each other to form one circular amphitheatre, while spectators were still seated in the two halves. But while this may be the origin of the architectural term amphitheatrum, it cannot be the origin of the architectural concept, since earlier stone amphitheatres, known as spectacula or amphitheatra, have been found.

According to Jean-Claude Golvin, the earliest known stone amphitheatres are found in Campania, at Capua, Cumae and Liternum, where such venues were built towards the end of the second century BC. The next-oldest amphitheatre known, as well as one of the best-researched, is the amphitheatre of Pompeii, securely dated to be built shortly after 70 BC. There are relatively few other known early amphitheatres: those at Abella, Teanum and Cales date to the Sullan era (until 78 BC), those at Puteoli and Telesia from the Augustan (27 BC–14 AD). The amphitheatres at Sutrium, Carmo and Ucubi were built around 40–30 BC, those at Antioch and Phaestum (Phase I) in the mid-first century BC.

=== Imperial era ===
In the Imperial era, amphitheatres became an integral part of the Roman urban landscape. As cities vied with each other for preeminence in civic buildings, amphitheatres became ever more monumental in scale and ornamentation. Imperial amphitheatres comfortably accommodated 40,000–60,000 spectators, or up to 100,000 in the largest venues, and were only outdone by the hippodromes in seating capacity. They featured multistoried, arcaded façades and were elaborately decorated with marble and stucco cladding, statues and reliefs, or even partially made of marble.

As the Empire grew, most of its amphitheatres remained concentrated in the Latin-speaking Western half, while in the East spectacles were mostly staged in other venues such as theatres or stadia. In the West, amphitheatres were built as part of Romanization efforts by providing a focus for the Imperial cult, by private benefactors, or by the local government of colonies or provincial capitals as an attribute of Roman municipal status. A large number of modest arenas were built in Roman North Africa, where most of the architectural expertise was provided by the Roman military.

=== Late Empire and decline ===
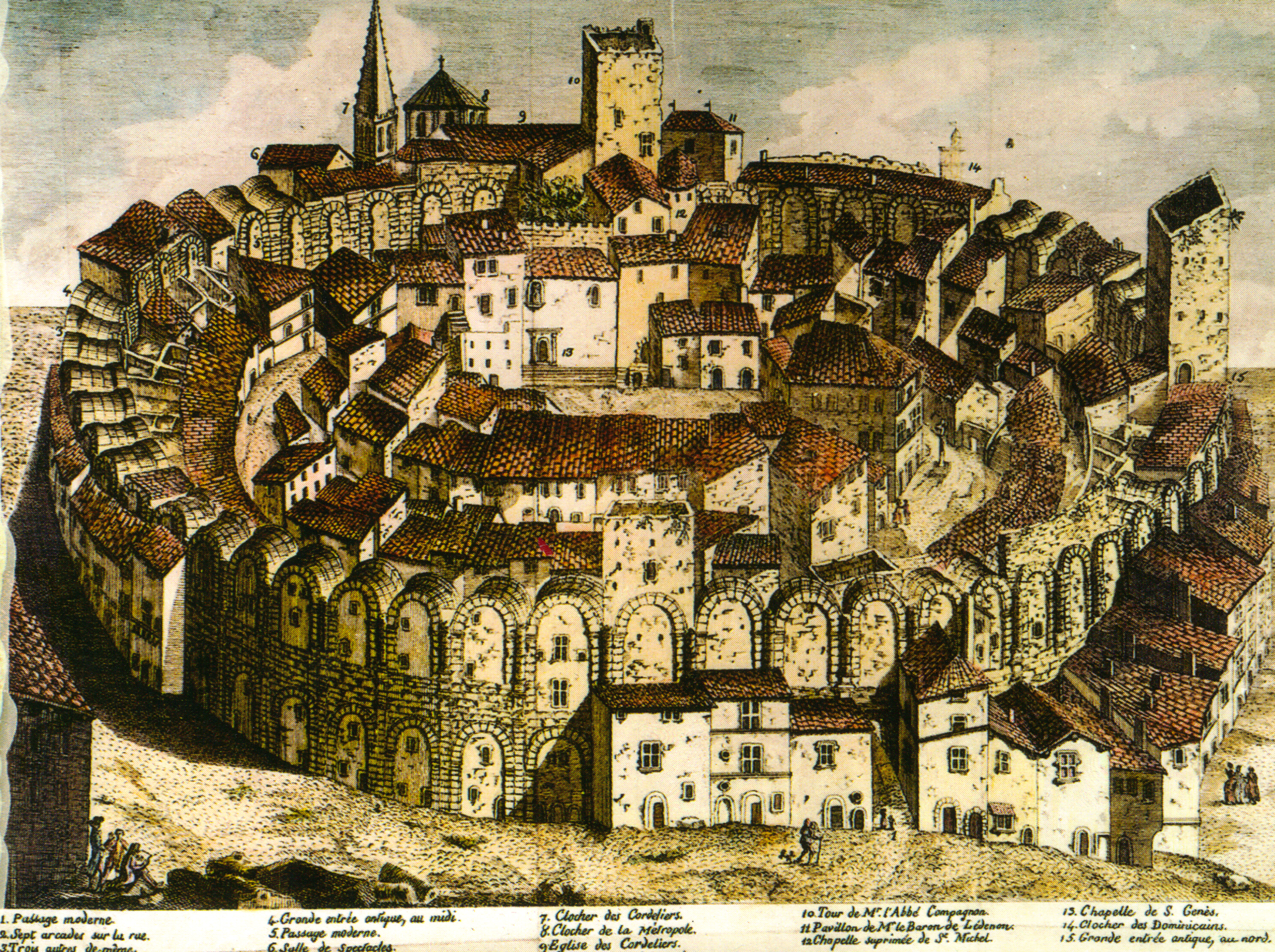
The Arles Amphitheatre as a fortified settlement, 18th-century engraving

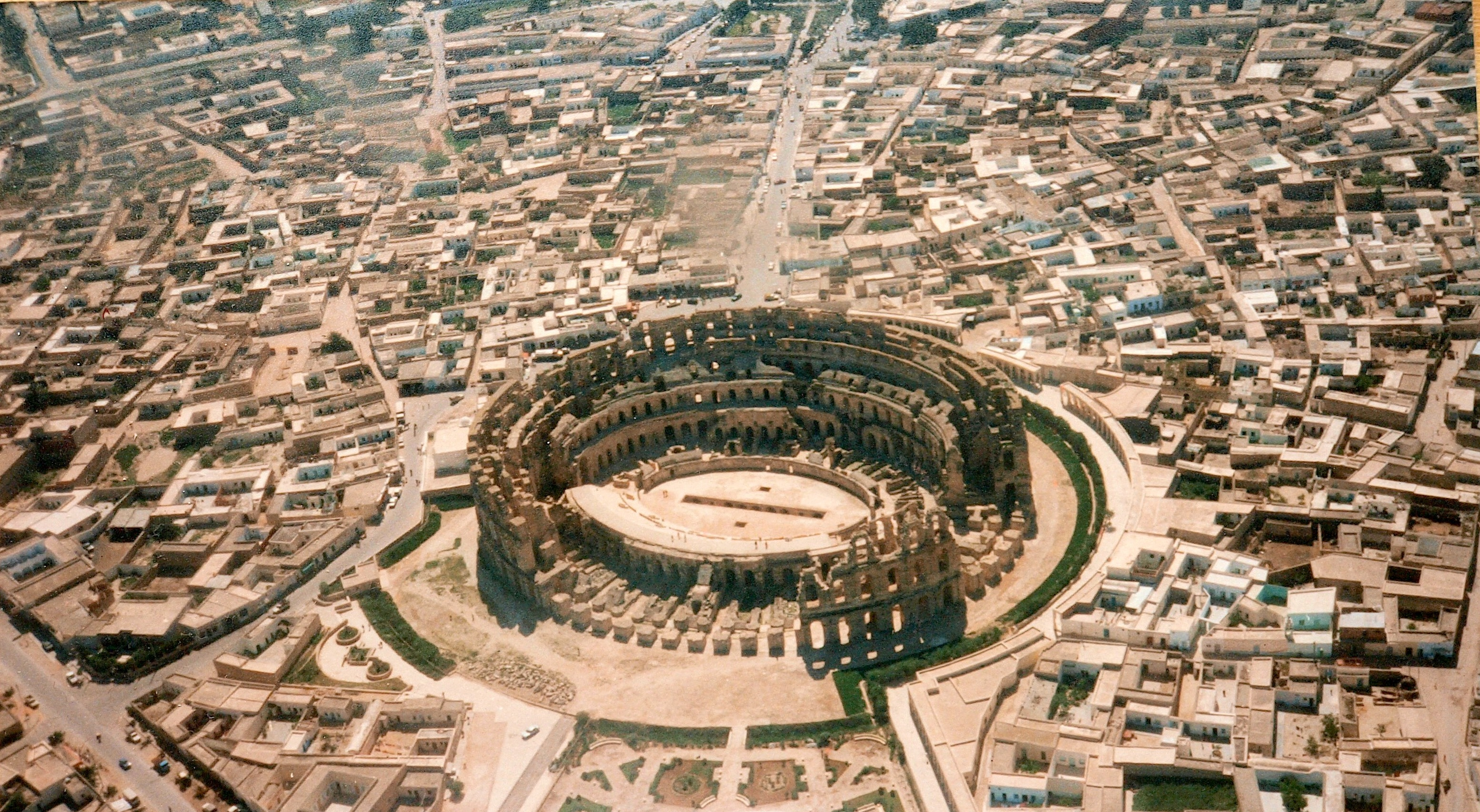
The Amphitheater of El Jem in Tunisia was converted to a fortress during the Arab invasions

Several factors caused the eventual extinction of the tradition of amphitheatre construction. Gladiatorial munera began to disappear from public life during the 3rd century, due to economic pressure, philosophical disapproval and opposition by the increasingly predominant new religion of Christianity, whose adherents considered such games an abomination and a waste of money. Spectacles involving animals, venationes, survived until the sixth century, but became costlier and rarer. The spread of Christianity also changed the patterns of public beneficence: where a pagan Roman would often have seen himself as a homo civicus, who gave benefits to the public in exchange for status and honor, a Christian would more often be a new type of citizen, a homo interior, who sought to attain a divine reward in heaven and directed his beneficence to alms and charity rather than public works and games.

These changes meant that there were ever fewer uses for amphitheatres, and ever fewer funds to build and maintain them. The last construction of an amphitheatre is recorded in 523 in Pavia under Theodoric. After the end of venationes, the only remaining purpose of amphitheatres was to be the place of public executions and punishments. After even this purpose dwindled away, many amphitheatres fell into disrepair and were gradually dismantled for building material, razed to make way for newer buildings, or vandalized. Others were transformed into fortifications or fortified settlements, such as at Leptis Magna, Sabratha, Arles and Pola, and in the 12th century the Frangipani fortified even the Colosseum to help them in Roman power struggles. Yet others were repurposed as Christian churches, including the arenas at Arles, Nîmes, Tarragona and Salona; the Colosseum became a Christian shrine in the 18th century.

Of the surviving amphitheatres, many are now protected as historic monuments; several are tourist attractions.

== Leading amphitheatres ==
=== The Colosseum ===
The Flavian Amphitheatre in Rome, more generally known as the Colosseum, is the archetypal and the largest amphitheatre. Built from 72 to 80 AD, it remains as an icon of ancient Rome. Its building and arena dimensions are 188 × 156 and 86 × 54 meters, respectively. It was commissioned by the Emperor Vespasian for the capital city of the ancient Roman Empire from 70 to 80 AD but was not completed and opened until 80 AD by his son Titus, as a gift for the people of Rome.

=== El Jem (Thysdrus) ===
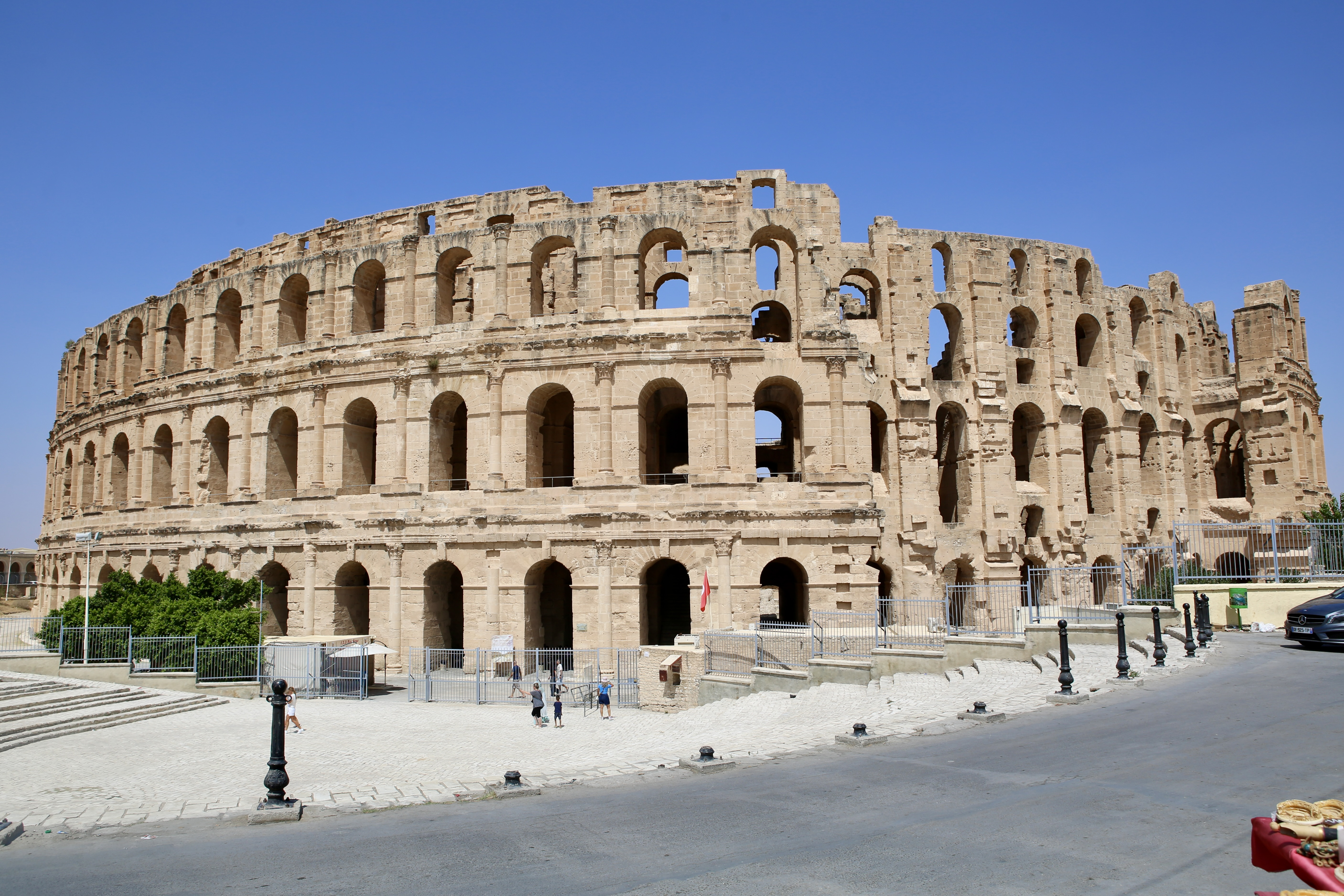
El Jem, Tunisia

In addition to being one of the largest Roman amphitheatres – 148 x 122 meters, with a capacity of 35,000 spectators – the Amphitheatre of El Jem, in Tunisia, is also one of the best preserved. It is a free-standing amphitheatre built entirely out of stone blocks, similar in structure to the Roman Colosseum. Most of the supporting structure of the tiered seating is intact, and the podium, arena, and underground passages are almost entirely intact. Some of the seating is also still intact and the amphitheatre serves as a venue for concerts and music festivals.

=== Pompeii ===
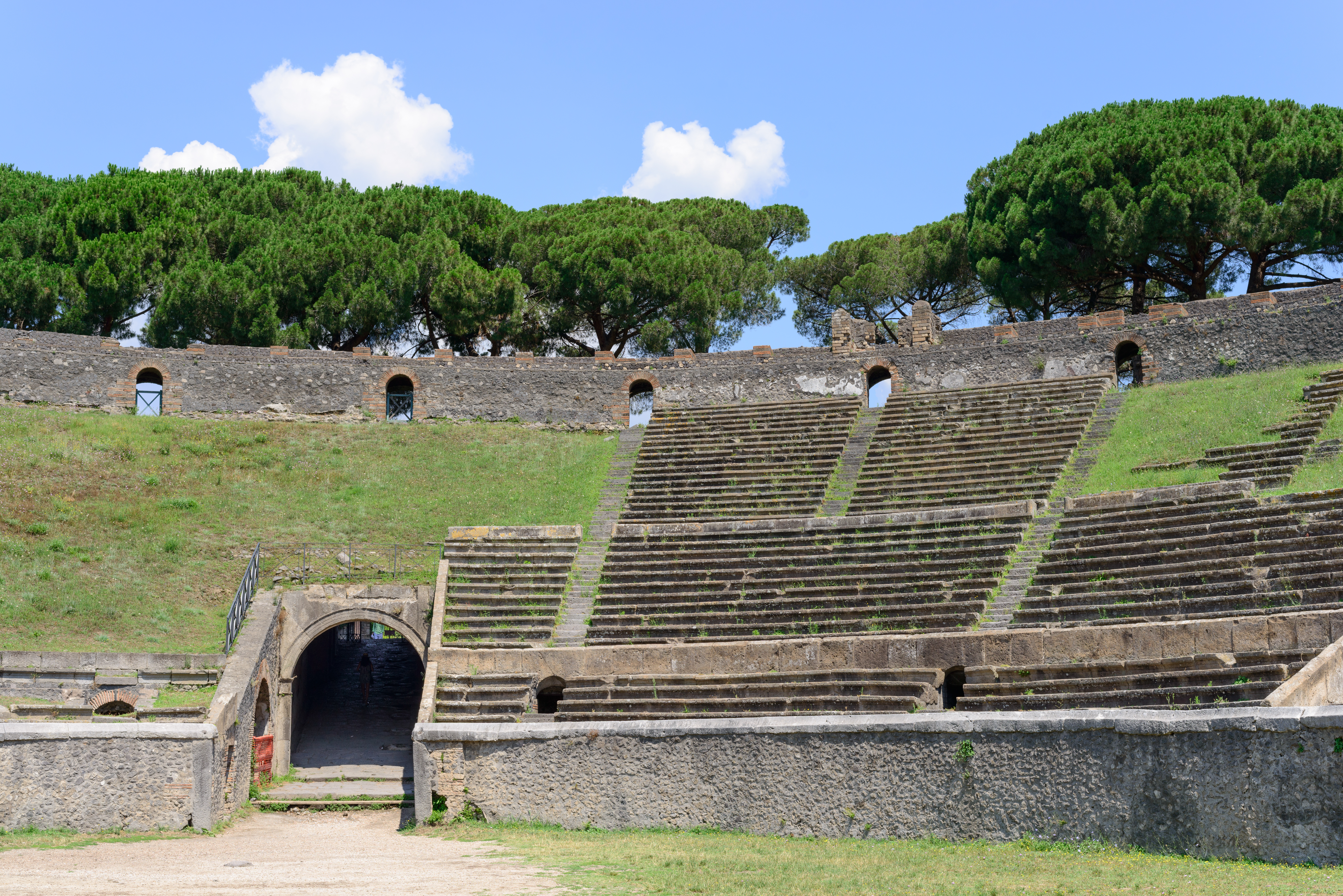
Cavea of the Amphitheatre of Pompeii

The Amphitheatre of Pompeii is one of the oldest surviving Roman amphitheatres. It is located in the Roman city of Pompeii, and was buried by the eruption of Vesuvius in 79 AD, that also buried Pompeii itself and the neighboring town of Herculaneum. It is also the oldest surviving Roman amphitheatre built with stone.

=== Faleria ===
Another Roman amphitheatre was the Faleria, built 43 A.D. It was located in Picenum (now Falerone), Italy. Its building dimensions were 178.8 × 106.2 meters, and it had an arena shaped like an ellipse. It had twelve entrances, four of which led to the arena and had eight rows of seats divided into three sections. Only the outside wall of the amphitheatre remains and the arena is covered in grass all the way to the podium.

=== Capua ===
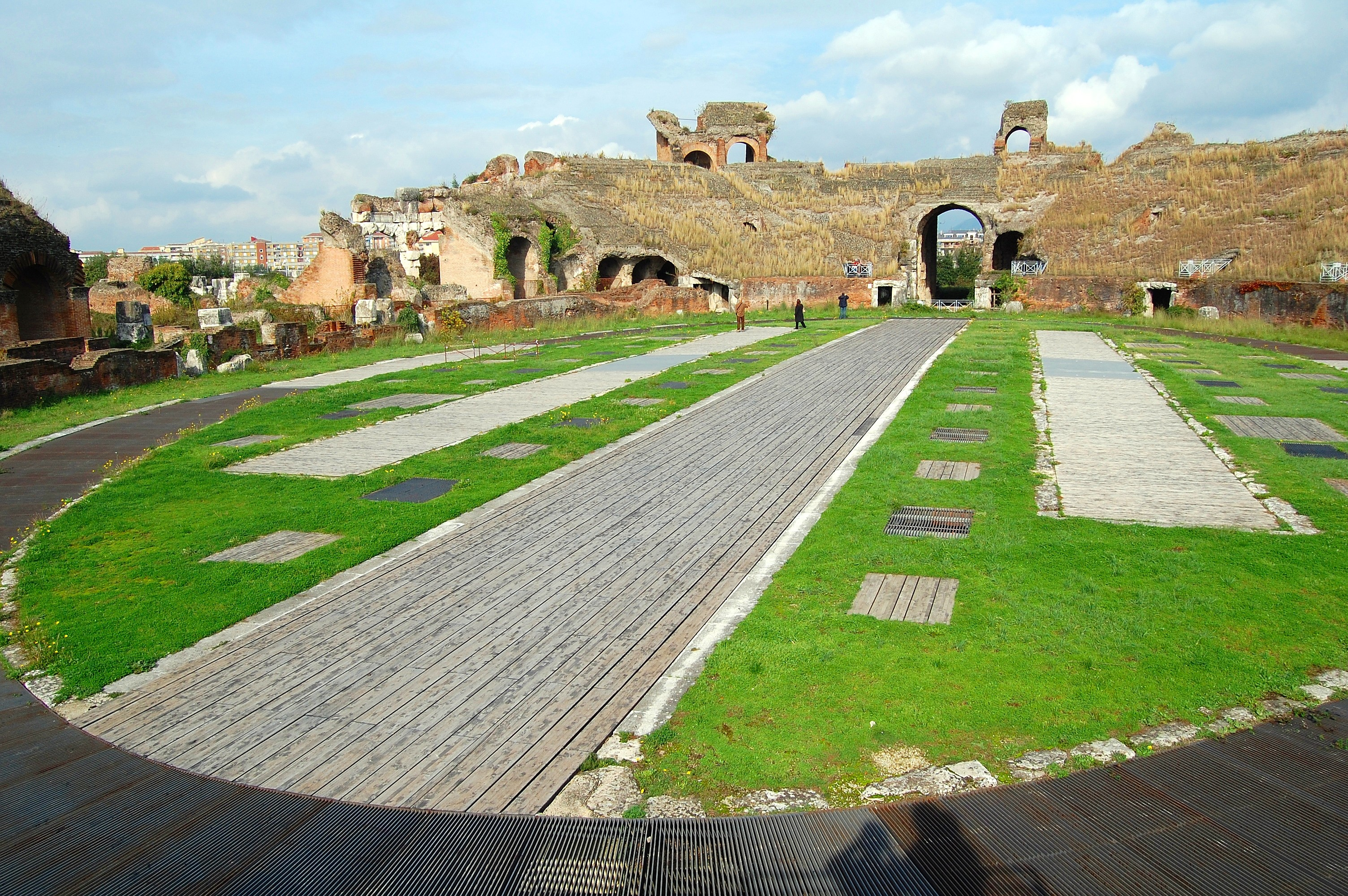
Amphitheatre of Capua

The third-largest Roman amphitheatre was the Amphitheatre of Capua, with building dimensions of 169.9 × 139.6 meters. It was located in the city of Capua (modern Santa Maria Capua Vetere), Italy. It was erected by Augustus in the first century B.C. and could hold up to 60,000 spectators. It is known as the arena that Spartacus fought in in 73 B.C. The theatre was eventually destroyed by the Vandals in their invasion of Rome in 456 AD.

=== Julia Caesarea ===
The fourth-largest Roman amphitheatre, the Julia Caesarea, was erected after the time of Julius Caesar. It was built in Mauretania between the times of 25 BC and 23 AD by the Roman-appointed ruler Juba II and his son Ptolemy, which is now considered to be modern day Cherchell, Algeria. Although it has not endured, its building dimensions are known to have been 168 × 88 meters with an arena dimension of 72.1 × 45.8 meters.

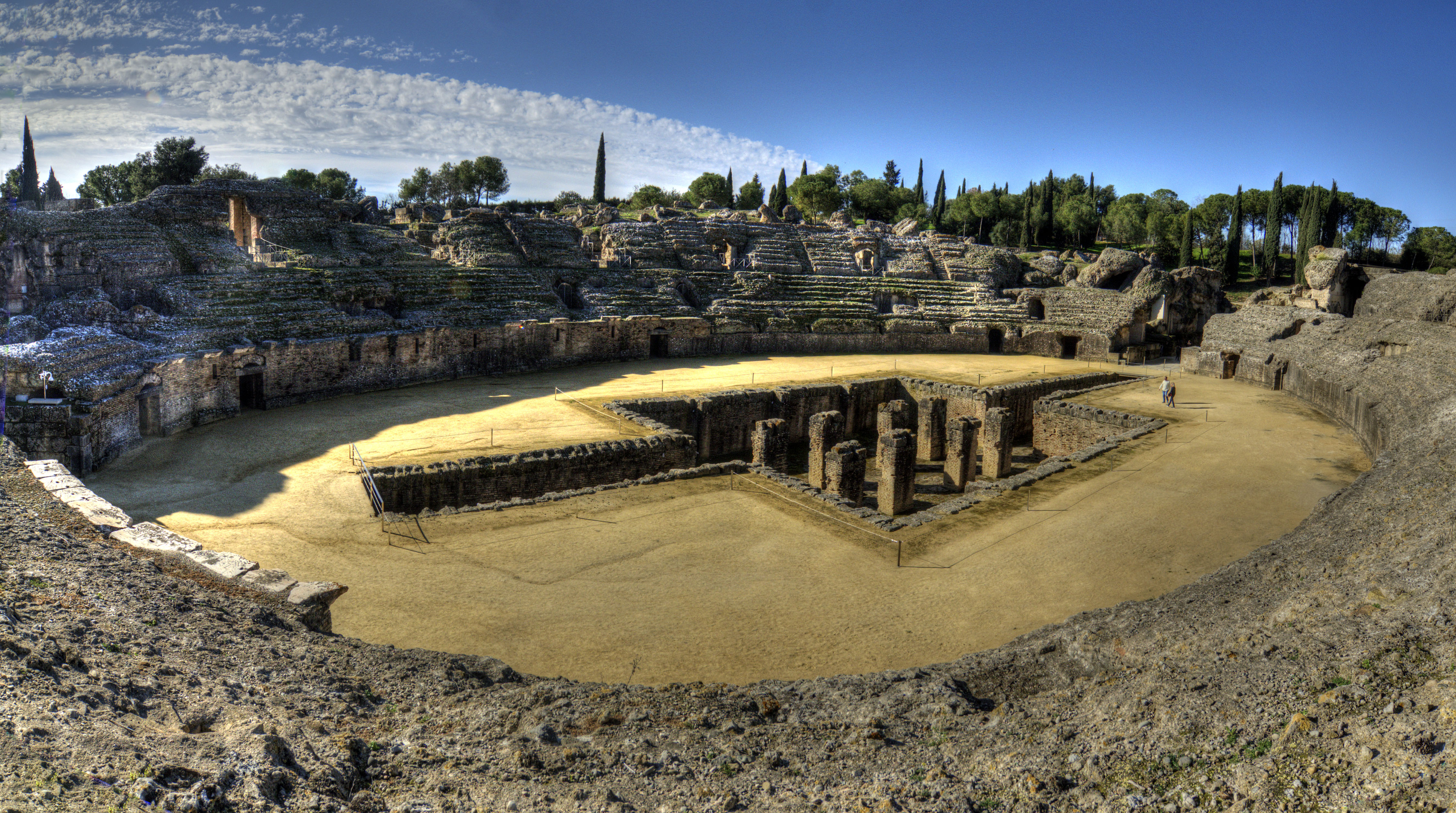
The Roman amphitheatre of Italica

=== Italica ===
The fifth-largest Roman amphitheatre is found in the province of Sevilla, Spain. Its building dimensions are 156.5 × 134 meters and its arena dimensions are 71. 2 × 46.2 meters. Built in the reign of emperor Hadrian, 117–138 AD, the Italica amphitheatre could hold up to 25,000 people and still stands today.

== See also ==
- Roman architectural revolution
- Theatre of ancient Rome
- Arenas of Besançon

== Bibliography ==
- Bomgardner, David Lee (October 2000). The Story of the Roman Amphitheatre. Routledge. ISBN 978-0-415-16593-8.
