= Hôtel de Ville, Bourges =

Town hall in Bourges, France

Hôtel de Ville
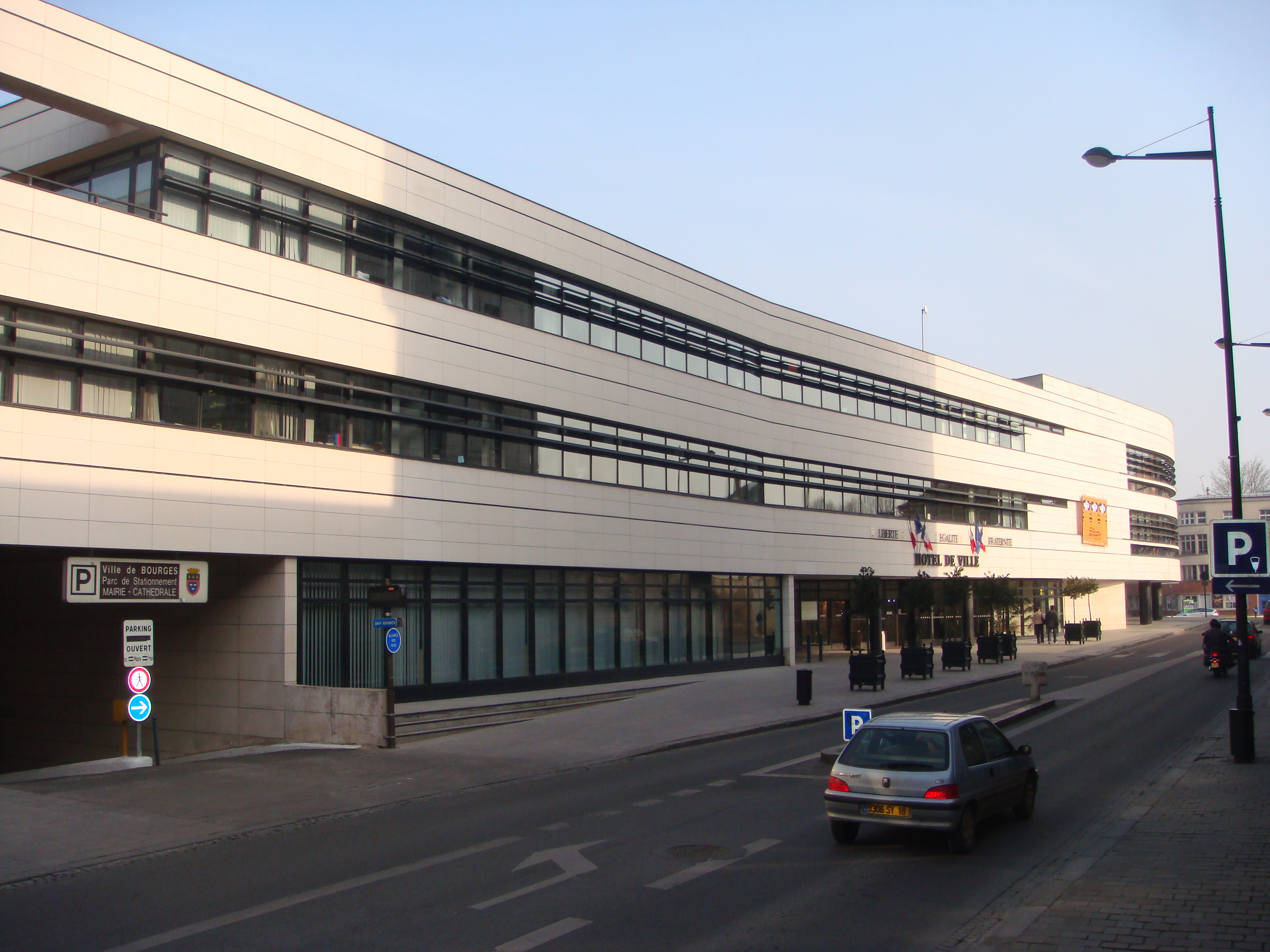
- The main frontage of the Hôtel de Ville in March 2009
- Interactive map of the Hôtel de Ville area

General information
- Type: City hall
- Architectural style: Modern style
- Location: Bourges, France
- Coordinates: 47.0805°N 2.3989°E
- Completed: 1992

Design and construction
- Architects: Claude Vasconi and Jean-Paul Chazelle

The Hôtel de Ville (French pronunciation: [otɛl də vil], City Hall) is a municipal building in Bourges, Cher, central France, standing on Rue Jacques Rimbault.

== History ==
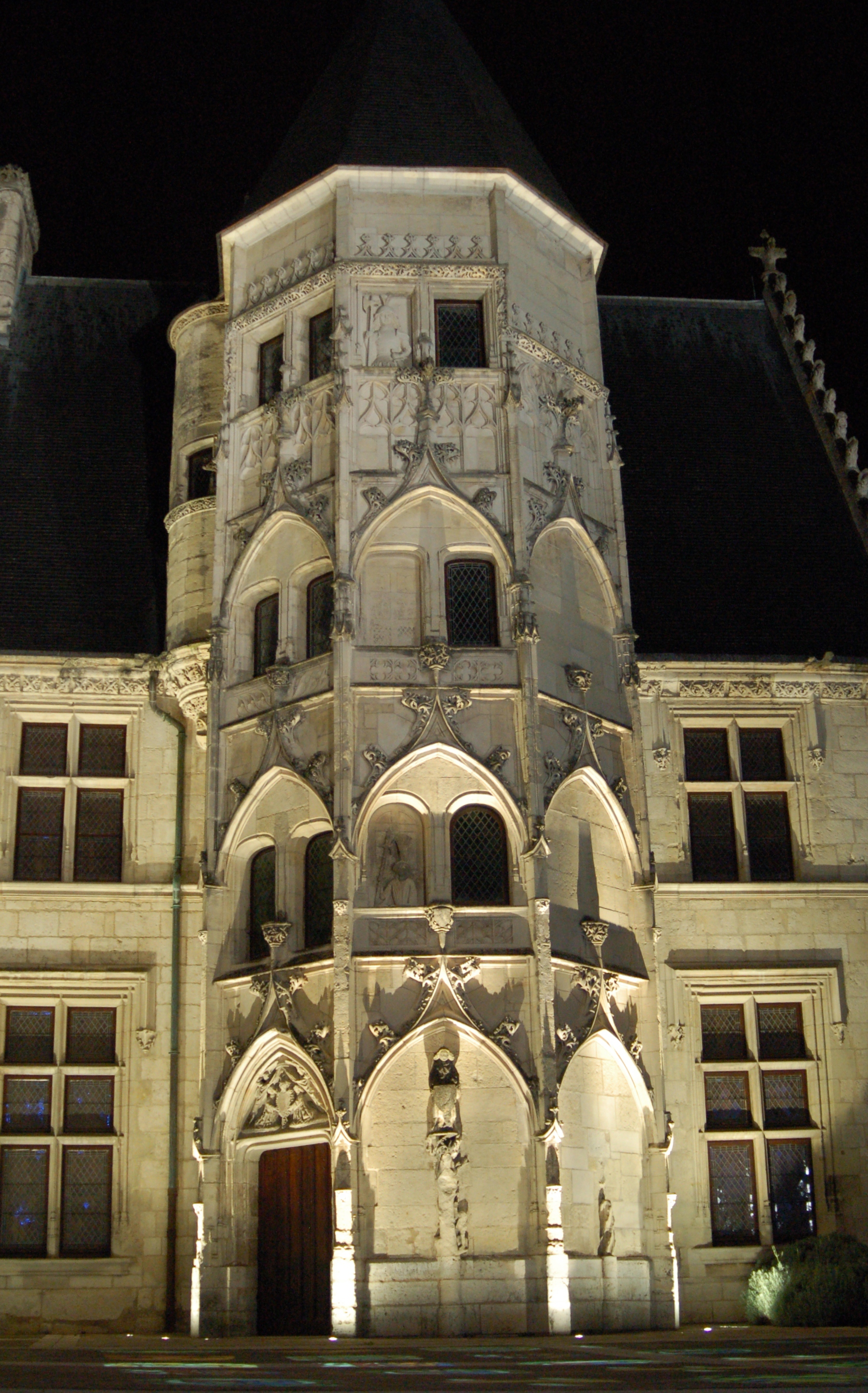
The Hôtel des Echevins (Aldermen's House)

Early meetings of the aldermen of Bourges took place in the cloister of the priory of Notre Dame de la Comtale which was destroyed in the Great Fire of Bourges in 1487. The first dedicated town hall in Bourges was the Hôtel des Echevins (Aldermen's House), in Rue Édouard-Branly, which was completed in 1492.

In 1682, the aldermen moved to their second town hall, Palais Jacques-Cœur, also known as Hôtel de la Chaussée, which had been erected in Rue Jacques-Coeur for the Grand Argentier (Great Treasurer) of France, Jacques Cœur, in the mid-15th century. The palace had been acquired by the statesman, Jean-Baptiste Colbert, in 1679, and he made it available to the aldermen three years later.

The aldermen were required to share the building with the commercial and criminal courts which made the accommodation very cramped and, in 1865, the council moved to its third home, Hôtel de Paskiewicz, located halfway up Rue Moyenne.

This arrangement continued until 1910, when the Palais Archiepiscopal (Archbishop's Palace) became available, following the implementation of the 1905 French law on the Separation of the Churches and the State. This building, the fourth town hall, was commissioned by Archbishop Michel Phélypeaux of La Vrillière in 1679, and became vacant after the death of Archbishop Pierre-Paul Servonnet, the last archbishop to occupy the palace.

Following the liberation of the town on 7 September 1944, during the Second World War, the chairman of the local resistance committee, Marcel Plaisant, arrived at the Archbishop's Palace and acclaimed a former councillor, Charles Cochet, as the new mayor.

By the 1980s, the Archbishop's Palace was too small, and the council, led by the mayor, Jacques Rimbault, decided to commission a new building. The site they selected had been occupied by the Grosse Tour, which had been commissioned by Philip II in 1189 as a place from which to control the town. It was demolished in 1653.

The new building was designed by Claude Vasconi and Jean-Paul Chazelle in the modern style, built in reinforced concrete and glass and was officially opened on 13 March 1992. The design involved an asymmetrical main frontage facing onto Rue Jacques Rimbault and followed the curves of the road. The main frontage was faced with alternating bands of concrete and dark-framed windows. Extensive efforts were made to preserve and protect the remains of the Grosse Tour during the construction work. Internally, the principal room was the Salle du Conseil (council chamber).

Repairs to the building were carried out after cladding on the main frontage came loose in November 2022. An exhibition to celebrate the life of Rimbault and his campaign to commission a new town hall was on display in the foyer of the building in May 2023.
