= Euralille =

Business district in Lille, France

Coordinates: 50°38′11″N 3°4′29″E

The two office towers designed by Christian de Portzamparc (left) and Claude Vasconi (right) above the Lille Europe railway station, seen from the Avenue Le Corbusier

Euralille is an urban quarter in the centre of Lille, France. Conceived as a major European business district in the late 1980s and early 1990s, it is strategically located at the intersection of the high-speed railway lines linking Paris, Brussels, and London, and incorporates the Gare de Lille Europe and Gare de Lille Flandres railway stations. The master plan was commissioned in 1988 to the Office of Metropolitan Architecture (OMA) led by Rem Koolhaas.

== Masterplan ==
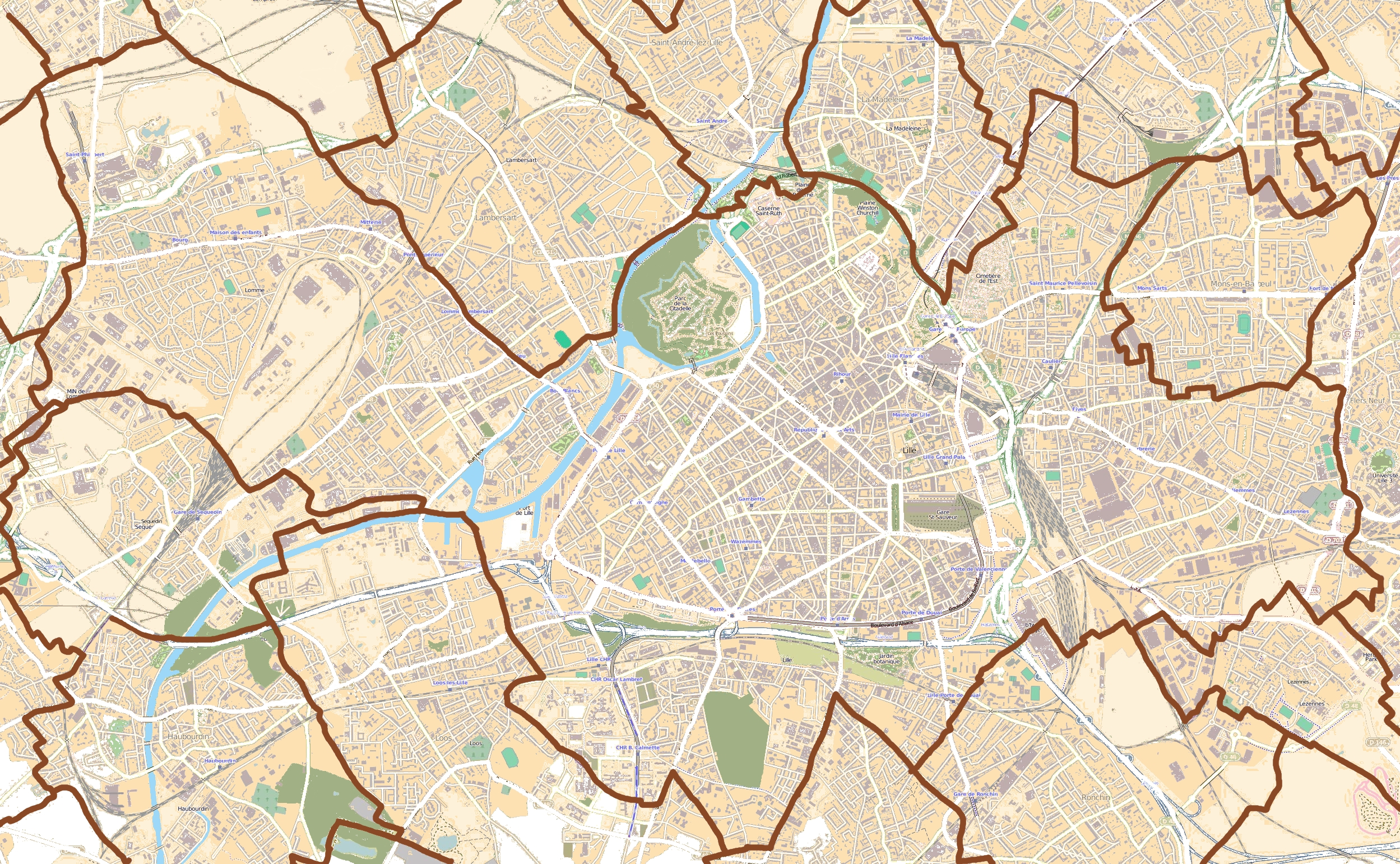
Location in Lille

The masterplan comprised an area of 120 hectares, and proposed a program of 800,000 square metres of floor area for various urban activities, including shopping, offices, hotels and housing, a concert hall and a congress centre. The planned functional mix has been subject to change and in 2006 comprised 40% office, 20% residential and 40% amenities space.

The masterplan defined several distinct areas: a mixed-use precinct comprising a shopping mall named Triangle des Gares designed by Jean Nouvel, the TGV station designed by Jean-Marie Duthilleul with two office towers above by architects Christian de Portzamparc and Claude Vasconi, the Parc Henri Matisse designed by Gilles Clément and a congress centre known as the Grand Palais designed by OMA. The masterplan also re-organized the infrastructure, a complicated junction of various transportation systems.

The initial development area has been extended since 2000 by another 22 hectares, named Euralille 2.

== Project development ==
The project was financed as a private-public partnership, established in 1990. The ambitious program was delayed in part because of the mid-1990s real-estate market crisis.

The first phase of the project opened in 1994 and continued to expand in the following decade. After the Tour de Lille and Tour Lilleurope office towers were completed in 1995, the Suite Hôtel was completed in 2005.
