= Amphora stamp =

Mark impressed on a transport amphora

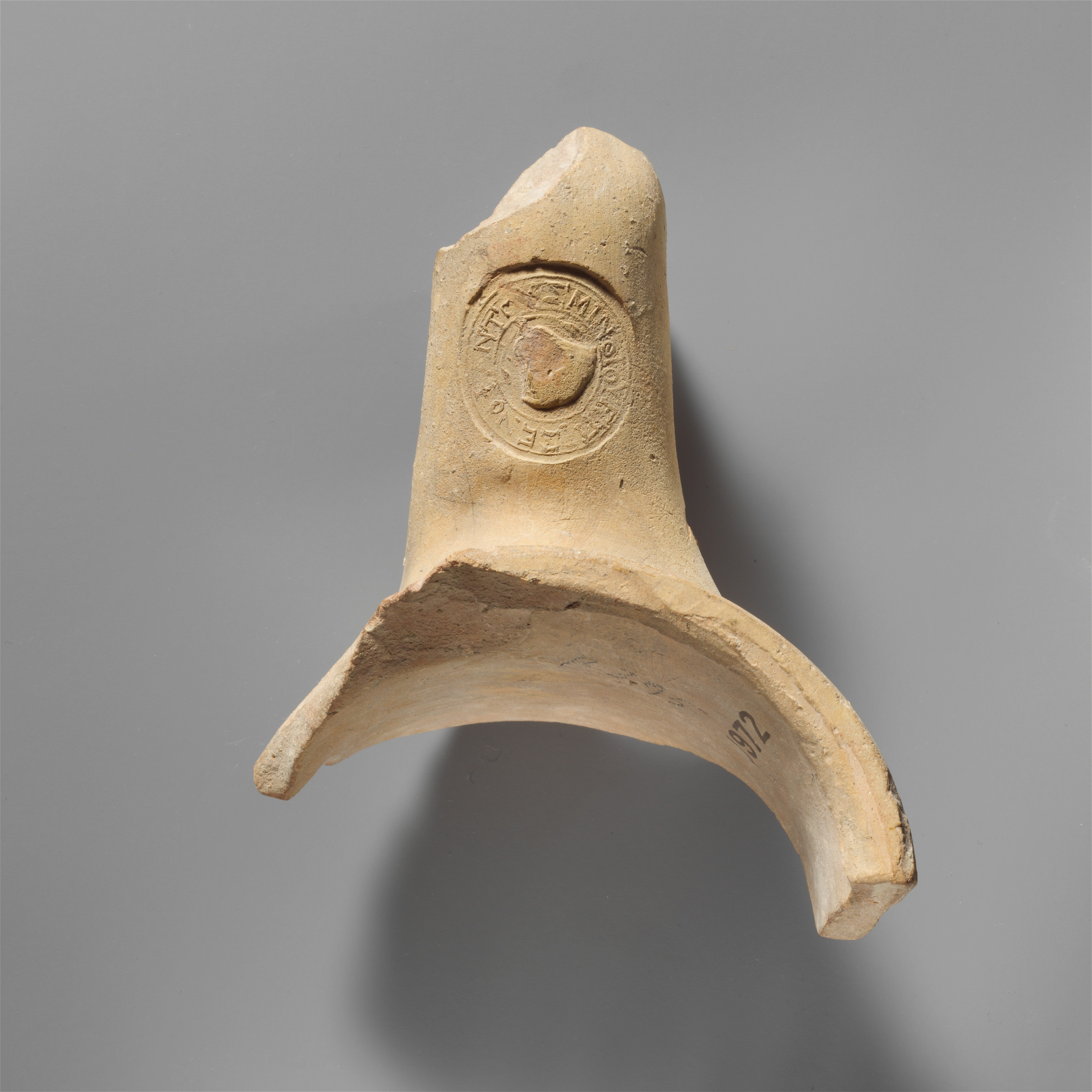
Stamped handle of a Rhodian terracotta amphora, Metropolitan Museum of Art (74.51.2420)

An amphora stamp is a mark impressed on a transport amphora from classical antiquity before its firing.

== Greek stamps ==
In ancient Greece, a stamp could identify the city of origin through an ethnic, a name for the city's inhabitants, often in the genitive plural. It could also name an eponymous official, whose term of office dated the amphora's production. Another name commonly identified a person conventionally called the manufacturer, although that person's exact role remains uncertain. An emblem could accompany or replace one of these elements.

The stamps help archaeologists date the contexts in which amphorae are found and study ancient trade. Not all amphora-producing cities used stamps. Within a city, the proportion of amphorae stamped could also change over time.

Major centres of stamped-amphora production included Rhodes, Thasos, Kos, Knidos, Sinope and Heraclea Pontica. Study of the stamps has allowed detailed chronologies to be established, although the precision of dating varies between series.

== Roman stamps ==
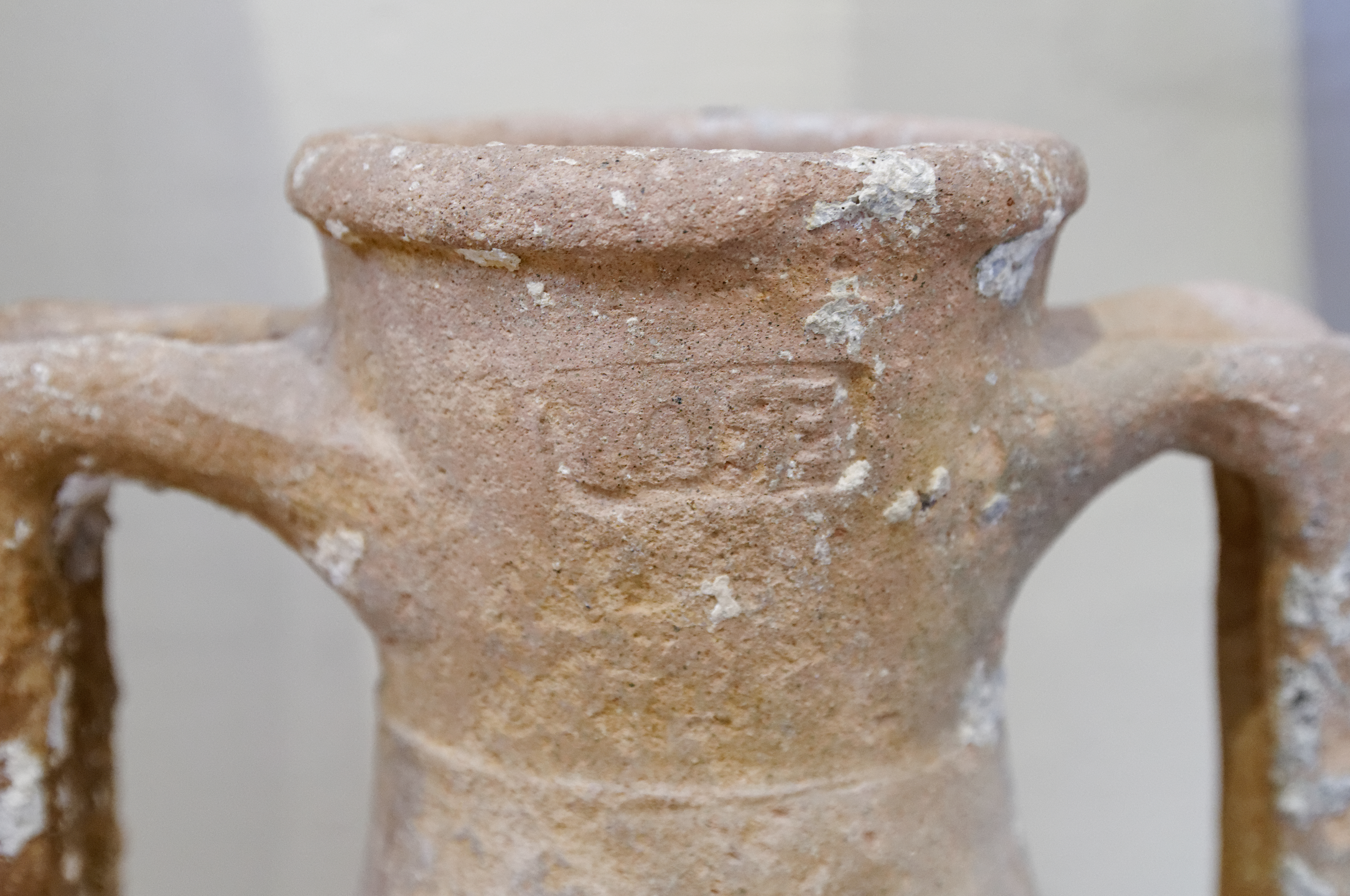
Potter's stamp on an Italic amphora

The abbreviated inscriptions on Roman amphora stamps can be difficult to interpret. They could identify people and workshops involved in production. In his study of oil amphorae from Baetica, François Jacques described a common pattern from the middle of the second century AD. Three letters usually represented the initials of a person's tria nomina, the three parts of a Roman name. These were often accompanied by an abbreviated name of a pottery workshop, or figlinae. Other letters could identify the manufacturer.

Heinrich Dressel interpreted the letters CV, following a person's initials, as the name of a workshop, Cuf(iense). Jacques rejected this interpretation because the stamps came from widely separated production sites and often gave a workshop name separately. He read CV as c(larissimus) v(ir), a title indicating senatorial rank. The abbreviated title became customary in inscriptions under Septimius Severus, but was not used consistently on amphora stamps.

== See also ==
- Amphorology

== Sources ==
- Badoud, Nathan (2017). "Deciphering Greek Amphora Stamps". CHS Research Bulletin. 5 (2).
- Debidour, Michel (1998). "Le timbrage des amphores, une prérogative publique ou privée ?" [The stamping of amphorae: a public or private prerogative?]. Ktèma (in French). 23: 275–286. doi:10.3406/ktema.1998.2737.
- Garlan, Yvon (2013). "Les timbres amphoriques en Grèce ancienne. Nouvelles questions. Nouvelles méthodes. Nouveaux résultats" [Amphora stamps in ancient Greece: new questions, new methods, new results]. Journal des savants (in French) (2): 203–270. doi:10.3406/jds.2013.6306.
- Jacques, François (1990). "Un exemple de concentration foncière en Bétique d'après le témoignage des timbres amphoriques d'une famille clarissime" [An example of land concentration in Baetica from the evidence of the amphora stamps of a family of senatorial rank]. Mélanges de l'École française de Rome. Antiquité (in French). 102 (2): 865–899. doi:10.3406/mefr.1990.1694.
