= Bourges =

Commune in Centre-Val de Loire, France

Bourges Borges (Berrichon)
- Prefecture and commune
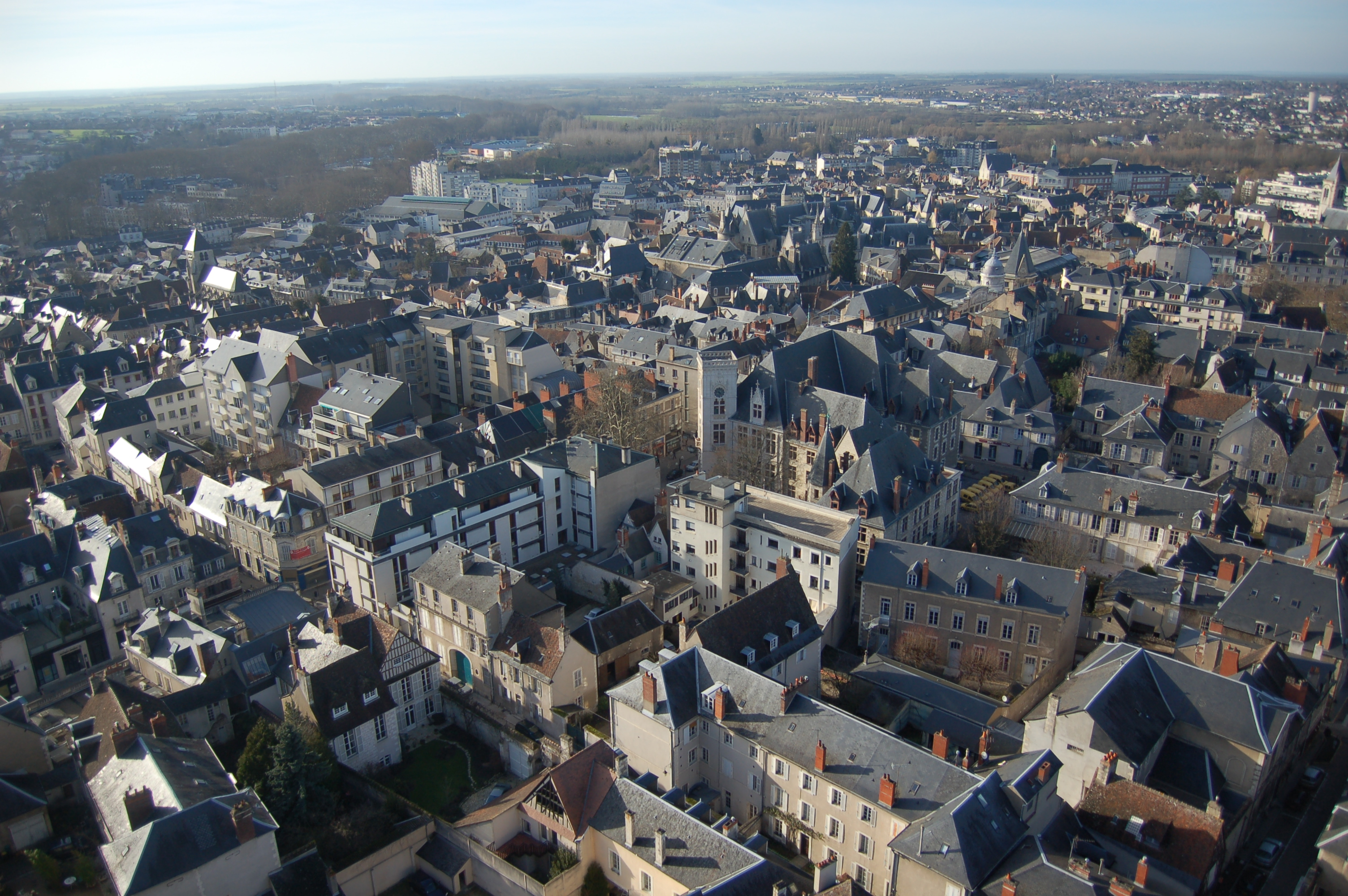
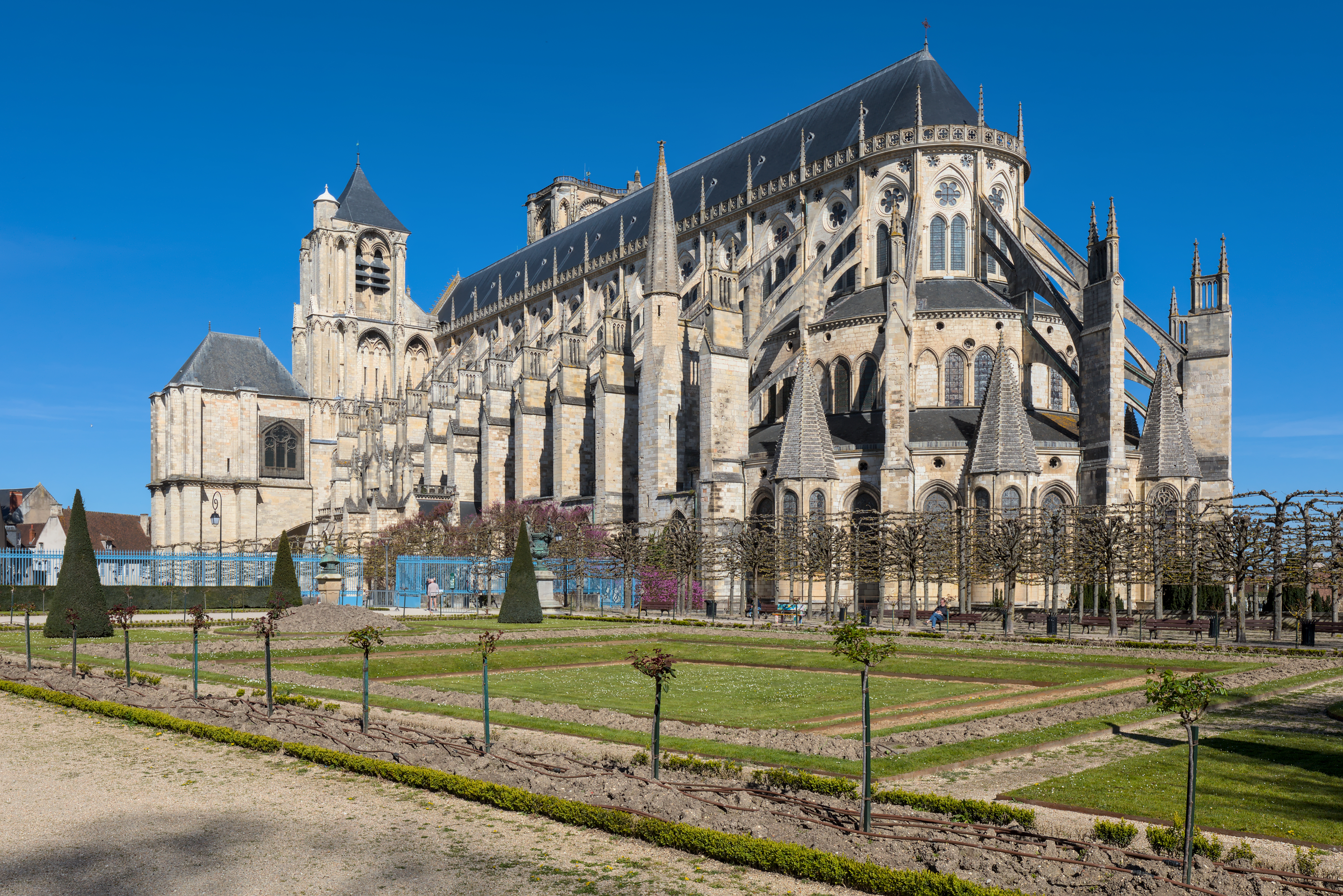
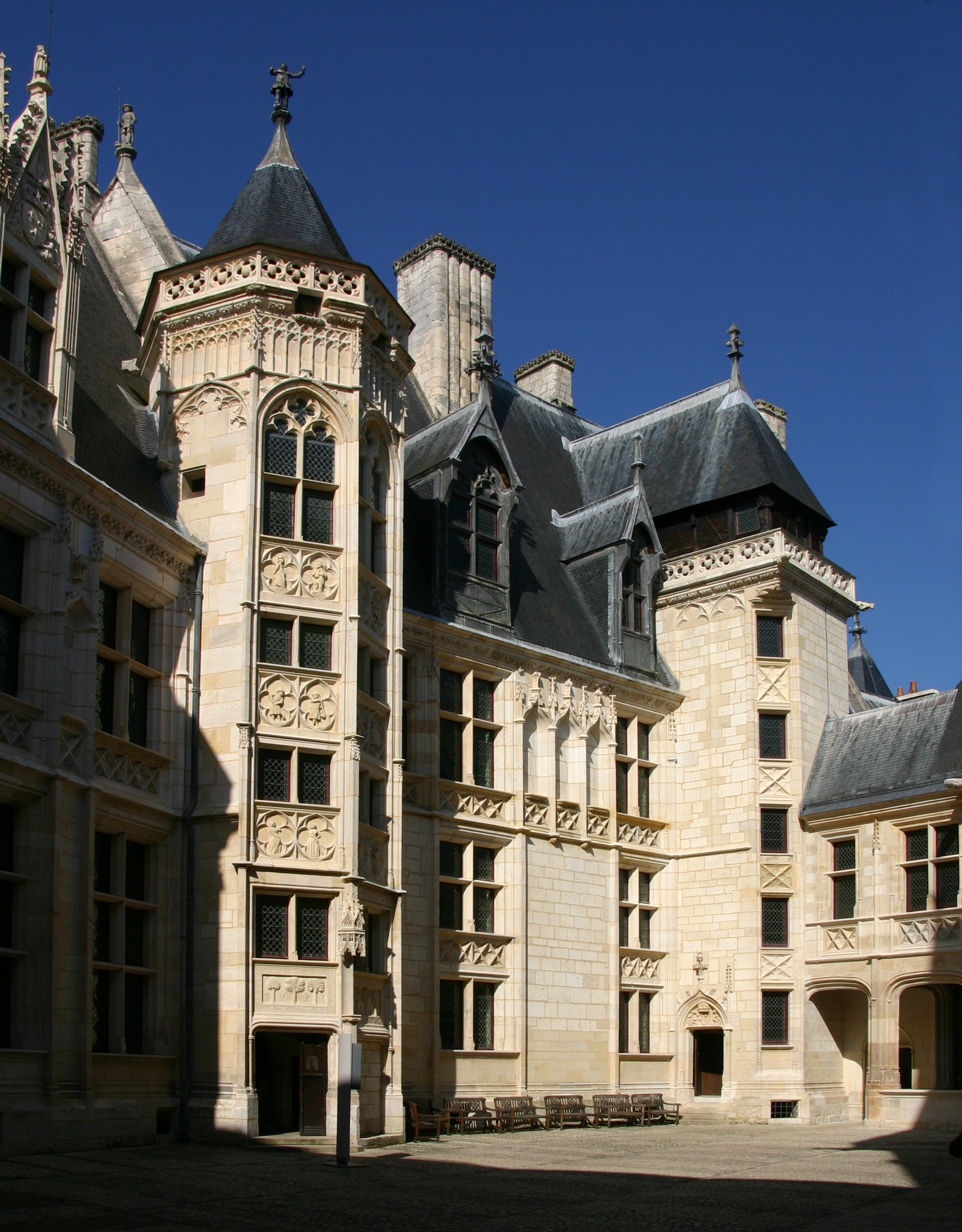
- View of Bourges Bourges Cathedral Palais Jacques Coeur

- Flag Coat of arms
- Location of Bourges
- Location within France Location within Centre-Val de Loire
- Coordinates: 47°4′46″N 2°23′45″E
- Country: France
- Region: Centre-Val de Loire
- Department: Cher
- Arrondissement: Bourges
- Intercommunality: CA Bourges Plus

Government
  - Mayor (2020–2026): Yann Galut
- Area^{1}: 68.74 km^{2} (26.54 sq mi)
- Elevation: 153 m (502 ft)
- Highest elevation: 169 m (554 ft)
- Lowest elevation: 120 m (390 ft)
- Population (2023): 64,186
  - Density: 933.8/km^{2} (2,418/sq mi)
- Demonym: Berruyers
- Time zone: UTC+01:00 (CET)
  - Summer (DST): UTC+02:00 (CEST)
- INSEE/Postal code: 18033 /18000
- Website: http://www.ville-bourges.fr/_en/site/introduction
- ^{1} French Land Register data, which excludes lakes, ponds, glaciers > 1 km^{2} (0.386 sq mi or 247 acres) and river estuaries.

Bourges (/bʊərʒ/ BOORZH; French: [buʁʒ]; Borges in Berrichon) is a commune in central France on the river Yèvre. It is the capital of the department of Cher, and also was the capital city of the former province of Berry. It is part of the Centre-Val de Loire region of France.

== History ==
The name of the commune derives either from the Bituriges, the name of the original inhabitants, or from the Germanic word Burg (French: bourg; Spanish: burgo; English, others: burgh, berg, or borough), for "hill" or "village". The Celts called it Avaricon; Latin-speakers: Avaricum. In the fourth century BC, as in the time of Caesar, the area around it was the center of a Gallic (Celtic) confederacy.

In 52 BC, the sixth year of the Gallic Wars, while the Gauls implemented a scorched-earth policy to try to deny Caesar's forces supplies, the inhabitants of Avaricum convinced the council not to have their town burned. It was temporarily spared due to its good defences provided by the surrounding marshes, by a river that nearly encircled it, and by a strong southern wall. Julius Caesar's forces, nevertheless, captured and destroyed the town, killing all but 800 of its inhabitants.

Rome reconstructed Avaricum as a Roman town, with a monumental gate, aqueducts, thermae and an amphitheatre; it reached a greater size than it would attain during the Middle Ages. The massive walls surrounding the late-Roman town, enclosing 40 hectares, were built in part with stone re-used from earlier public buildings.

The third-century AD Saint Ursinus, also known as Saint Ursin, is considered the first bishop of the town. Bourges functions as the seat of an archbishopric. During the 8th century Bourges lay on the northern fringes of the Duchy of Aquitaine and was therefore the first town to come under Frankish attacks when the Franks crossed the Loire. The Frankish Charles Martel captured the town in 731, but Duke Odo the Great of Aquitaine immediately re-took it. It remained under the rule of counts who pledged allegiance to the Aquitanian dukes up to the destructive siege by the Frankish King Pepin the Short in 762, when Basque troops are found defending the town along with its count.

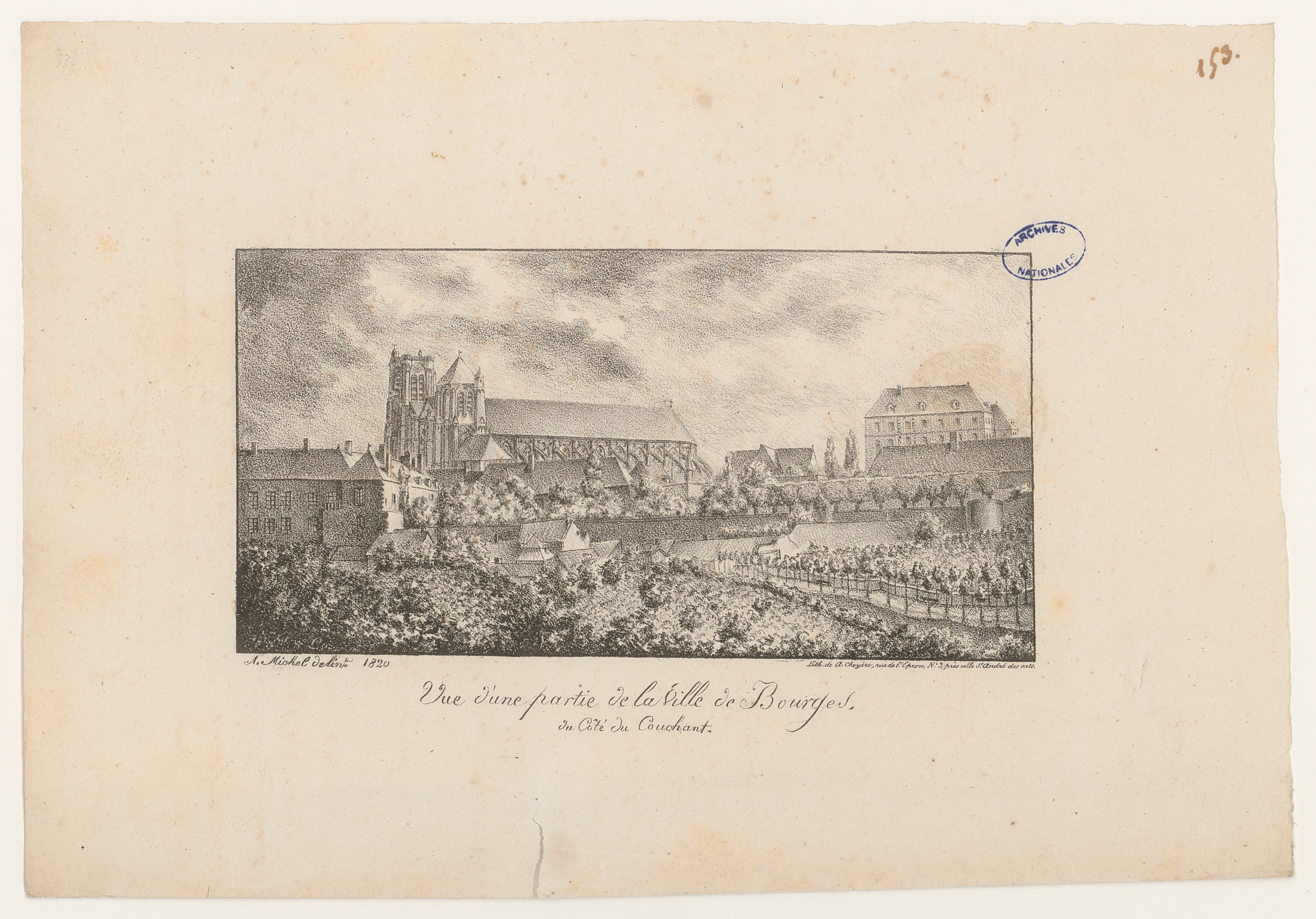
Bourges in 1820

During the Middle Ages, Bourges served as the capital of the Viscounty of Bourges until 1101. In the fourteenth century, it became the capital of the Duchy of Berry (established in 1360). The future king of France, Charles VII (r. 1422–1461), sought refuge there in the 1420s during the Hundred Years' War. His son, Louis XI, was born there in 1423. In 1438, Charles VII decreed the Pragmatic Sanction of Bourges. During this period, Bourges was a major centre of alchemy. In 1487, a third of Bourges was destroyed by fire, after which the economic decline of the city started.

The Gothic Cathedral of Saint Étienne, begun at the end of the twelfth century, ranks as a World Heritage Site. It is one of the earliest examples of the High Gothic style of the thirteenth century.

Bourges has a long tradition of art and history. Apart from the cathedral, other sites of importance include the 15th-century Palais Jacques Cœur and a sixty-five-hectare district of half-timbered houses and fine town-houses.

Bourges became an important center of artillery production from the 1860s, when Napoleon III decided to relocate the École de pyrotechnie militaire, at the time located in Metz, far away from the Prussian border.

During the German occupation, SS officer Eric Hasse commanded a Gestapo force of about 15 Germans and 12 French auxiliaries. The best known among them, Pierre Paoli, a native of Aubigny-sur-Nère, entered German service as an interpreter before quickly being promoted to the Gestapo. He arrested and tortured more than 200 people between April 1943 and August 1944.

== Population ==
Historical population

Year	Pop.	±% p.a.
1793	15,964	—
1800	16,330	+0.32%
1806	17,552	+1.21%
1821	18,910	+0.50%
1831	19,730	+0.43%
1836	25,324	+5.12%
1841	22,826	−2.06%
1846	24,799	+1.67%
1851	25,037	+0.19%
1856	26,799	+1.37%
1861	28,064	+0.93%
1866	30,119	+1.42%
1872	31,312	+0.65%
1876	35,785	+3.39%
1881	40,217	+2.36%
1886	42,829	+1.27%
1891	45,342	+1.15%
1896	43,587	−0.79%
1901	46,551	+1.32%

Year	Pop.	±% p.a.
1906	44,133	−1.06%
1911	45,735	+0.72%
1921	45,942	+0.05%
1926	44,245	−0.75%
1931	45,067	+0.37%
1936	49,263	+1.80%
1946	51,040	+0.35%
1954	53,879	+0.68%
1962	60,632	+1.49%
1968	70,814	+2.62%
1975	77,300	+1.26%
1982	76,432	−0.16%
1990	75,609	−0.14%
1999	72,480	−0.47%
2007	71,155	−0.23%
2012	66,666	−1.29%
2017	64,551	−0.64%
2023	64,186	−0.09%

Source: EHESS and INSEE (1968–2023)

== Geography ==
Bourges sits at the river junction where the Auron flows into the Yèvre. The disused Canal de Berry follows alongside the course of the Auron through Bourges.

=== Climate ===
Bourges, located in the center of France, away from the Atlantic Ocean, features a typical degraded oceanic climate (Köppen: Cfb), characterized by colder, drier winters and warmer, wetter summers than the oceanic climate.

Climate data for Bourges, elevation: 161 m (528 ft) (1991–2020 normals, extremes 1945–present)
Month	Jan	Feb	Mar	Apr	May	Jun	Jul	Aug	Sep	Oct	Nov	Dec	Year
Record high °C (°F)	17.6 (63.7)	22.8 (73.0)	29.4 (84.9)	29.4 (84.9)	33.8 (92.8)	39.5 (103.1)	41.7 (107.1)	39.9 (103.8)	36.4 (97.5)	31.9 (89.4)	23.4 (74.1)	20.0 (68.0)	41.7 (107.1)
Mean daily maximum °C (°F)	7.4 (45.3)	8.9 (48.0)	13.1 (55.6)	16.3 (61.3)	20.1 (68.2)	23.8 (74.8)	26.2 (79.2)	26.2 (79.2)	22.1 (71.8)	17.2 (63.0)	11.2 (52.2)	7.9 (46.2)	16.7 (62.1)
Daily mean °C (°F)	4.5 (40.1)	5.1 (41.2)	8.4 (47.1)	11.1 (52.0)	14.8 (58.6)	18.4 (65.1)	20.5 (68.9)	20.5 (68.9)	16.7 (62.1)	12.9 (55.2)	7.9 (46.2)	5.0 (41.0)	12.1 (53.8)
Mean daily minimum °C (°F)	1.6 (34.9)	1.4 (34.5)	3.7 (38.7)	5.8 (42.4)	9.5 (49.1)	13.0 (55.4)	14.8 (58.6)	14.7 (58.5)	11.3 (52.3)	8.5 (47.3)	4.6 (40.3)	2.2 (36.0)	7.6 (45.7)
Record low °C (°F)	−20.4 (−4.7)	−16.4 (2.5)	−11.3 (11.7)	−3.8 (25.2)	−2.6 (27.3)	3.4 (38.1)	4.6 (40.3)	4.6 (40.3)	1.8 (35.2)	−5.0 (23.0)	−9.1 (15.6)	−14.0 (6.8)	−20.4 (−4.7)
Average precipitation mm (inches)	58.0 (2.28)	51.0 (2.01)	52.8 (2.08)	62.0 (2.44)	75.9 (2.99)	58.4 (2.30)	63.5 (2.50)	53.5 (2.11)	56.7 (2.23)	74.2 (2.92)	69.3 (2.73)	67.4 (2.65)	742.7 (29.24)
Average precipitation days (≥ 1.0 mm)	11.5	9.6	9.6	9.9	10.7	8.5	8.0	7.7	7.9	10.2	11.6	11.9	117.2
Average snowy days	3.9	3.6	2.5	1.0	0.1	0	0	0	0	0	1.5	2.7	15.3
Average relative humidity (%)	87	82	76	73	76	74	69	71	75	84	87	88	79
Mean monthly sunshine hours	65.5	93.5	155.9	185.6	215.6	227.4	248.6	239.8	194.0	127.0	76.6	59.5	1,888.9
Source 1: Meteociel
Source 2: Infoclimat.fr (humidity and snow days (1961–1990)

== Industry ==
In 2025, one-sixth of the population worked in the defense industry, primarily in manufacturing arms. Notable local employers include KNDS France and MBDA.

== Sights ==
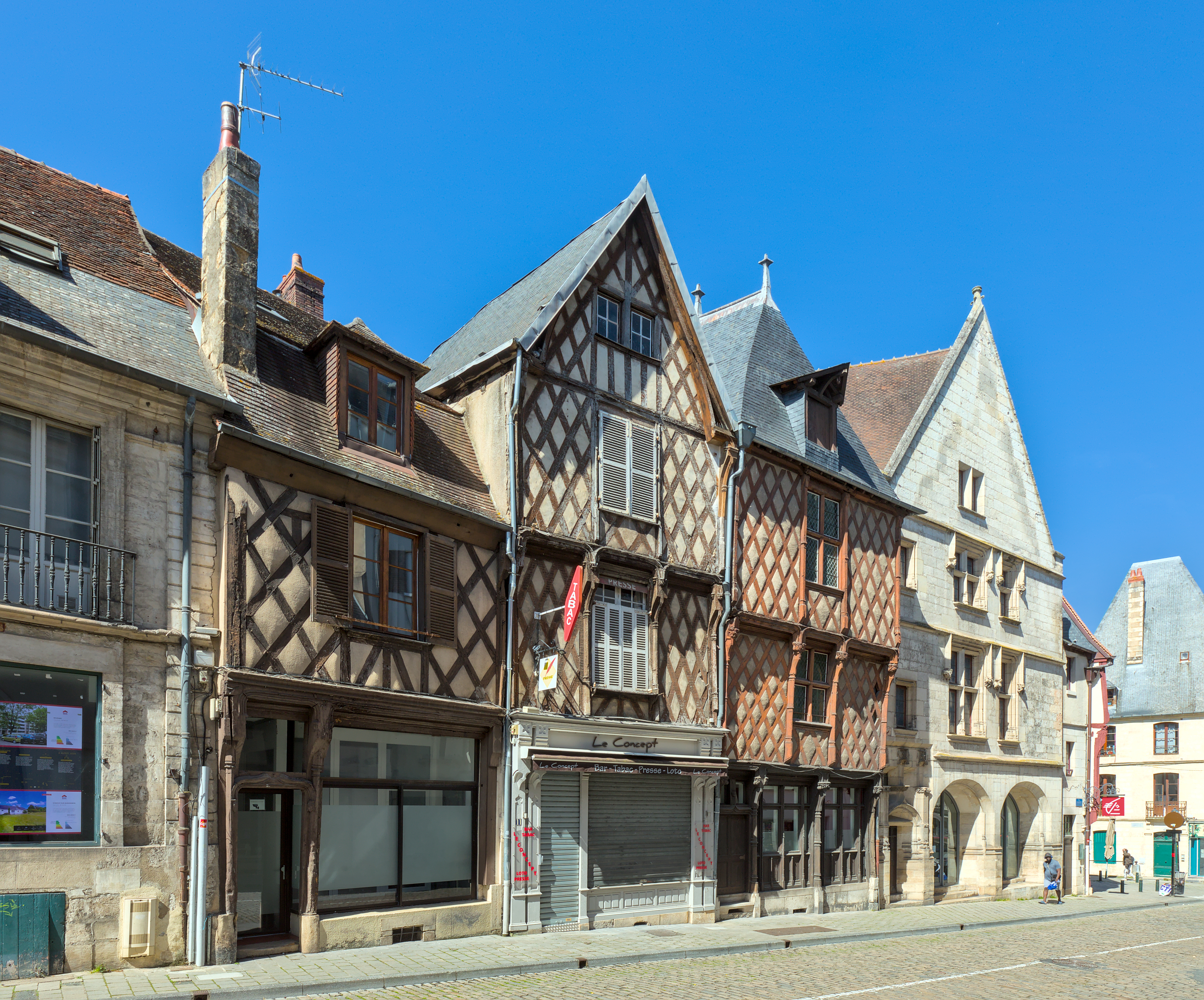
Half-timbered houses in Rue Pelvoysin

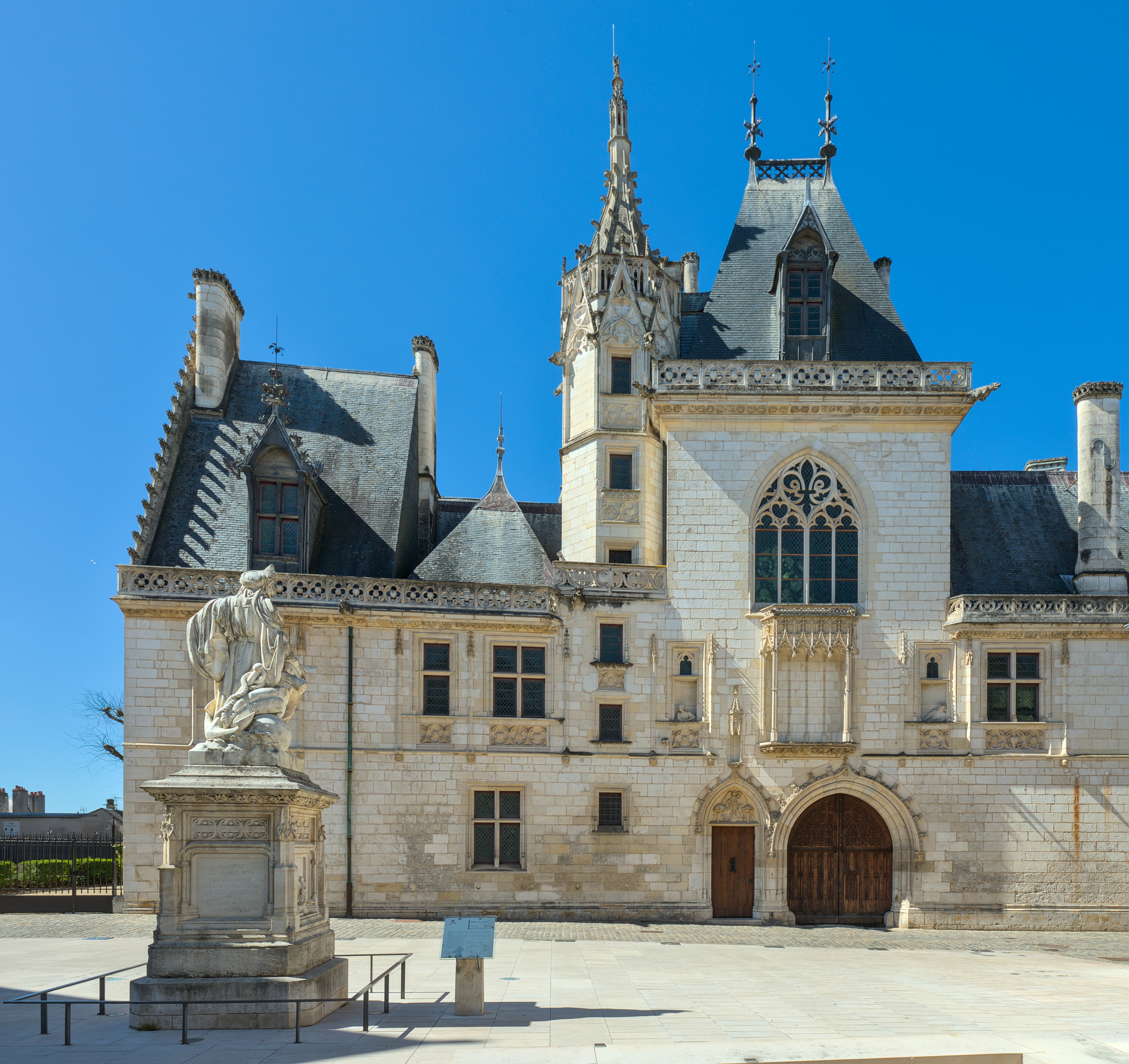
Palais Jacques Cœur

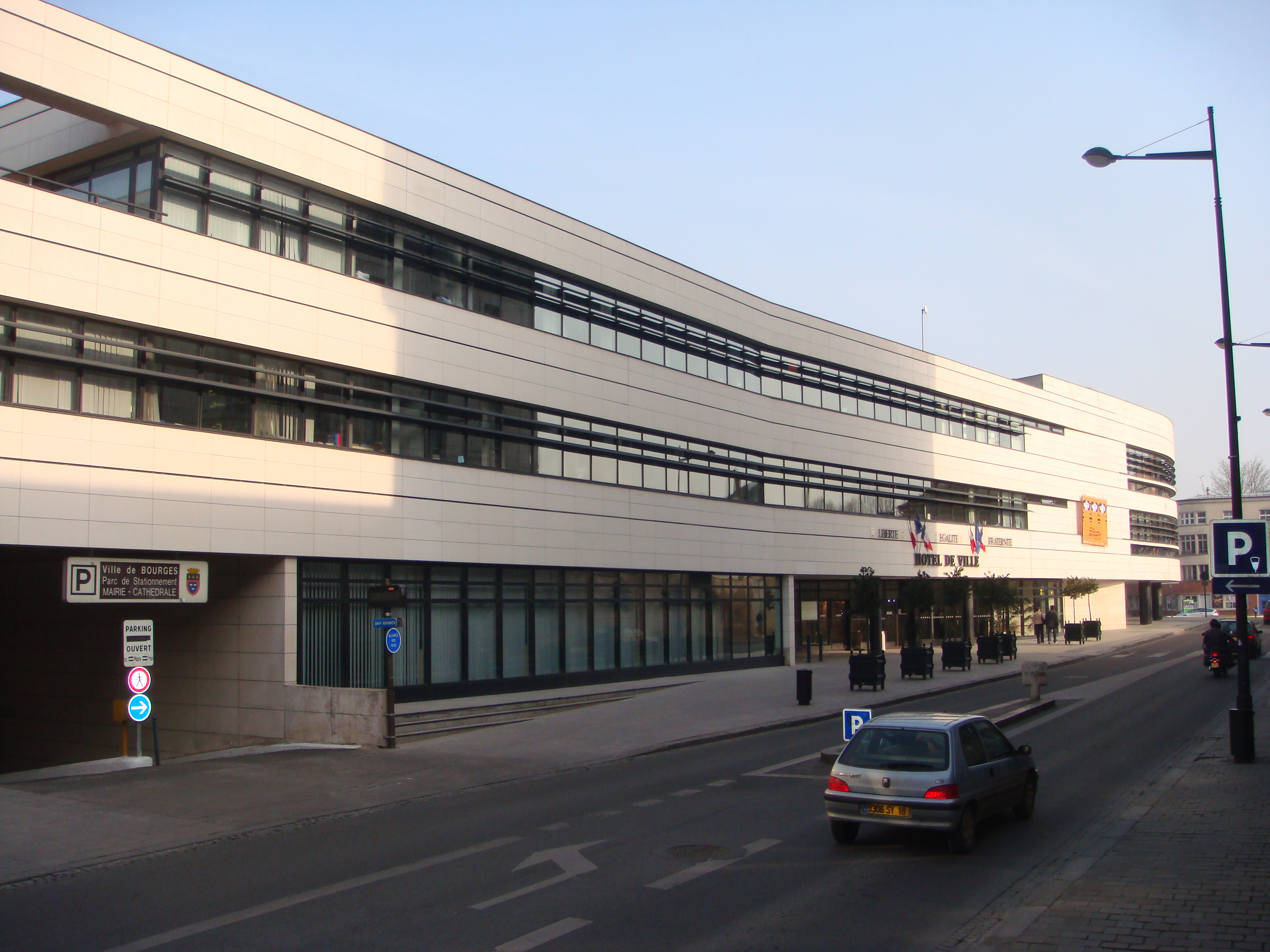
The new Hôtel de Ville

- Its Gothic cathedral (built 1195–1255) was added to the list of the World Heritage Sites by UNESCO in 1992
- Palais Jacques Cœur
- Lallemant's hotel, from the early French Renaissance
- The Berry museum, located in the Cujas' hotel
- The Estève museum, located in the so-called aldermen's hotel
- The marshes of the Yèvre and Voiselle rivers were listed in 2003 as a French Natural Monument or Site
- The ruins of the Gallo-Roman walls
- The Conservatoire national du Pélargonium
- The new Hôtel de Ville completed in 1992.

=== Events ===
The Printemps de Bourges music festival takes place in Bourges every year.

Every summer, and since 2002, Les mille univers hosts a writing workshop in collaboration with Oulipo.

Bourges was chosen as a European capital of culture for 2028.

== Transport ==
The Bourges station offers direct railway connections to Orléans, Tours, Lyon, Paris, Nantes and several regional destinations. The A71 motorway connects Bourges with Orléans and Clermont-Ferrand. Bourges Airport is a small regional airport. The nearest major airports are Clermont-Ferrand Auvergne Airport, located 185 km (115 mi) south and Lyon–Saint-Exupéry Airport, located 319 km (198 mi) south east.

== Sport and recreation ==
Bourges' principal football team was the now dissolved Bourges Football 18. It is also home to the women's basketball club CJM Bourges Basket, which has won multiple titles in domestic and European basketball. Bourges XV is a rugby team in the region, playing in French National Division, Federal 3.

== Colleges and universities ==
- University of Bourges
- École des Beaux Arts
- École Nationale Supérieure d'Ingénieurs ENSI

== Twin towns – sister cities ==
Bourges is twinned with:

- Augsburg, Germany
- Aveiro, Portugal
- Forlì, Italy
- Koszalin, Poland
- Palencia, Spain
- Peterborough, United Kingdom
- Yoshkar-Ola, Russia
- Korosten, Ukraine

== Personalities ==
- 16th-century poet and translator Pierre Motin was born in Bourges.
- 17th-century composer and singer François Bourgoing was born in Bourges.
- The merchant Jacques Cœur was born in Bourges.
- The manuscript illuminator Jean Colombe maintained a workshop in Bourges.
- John Calvin was a student in the University of Bourges.
- The legal expert Jacques Cujas lived in Bourges during 1555-1557 and 1575–1590.
- Eustadiola (594–684) was a saint and abbess.
- The Impressionist painter Berthe Morisot was born in Bourges on 14 January 1841.
- The Art Nouveau sculptor Julien Caussé was born in Bourges in 1869.
- The philosopher Vladimir Jankélévitch (1903-1985) was born in Bourges.
- The writer and historian Jules Bertaut (1877–1959) was born in Bourges.
- Angèle Chevrin (1911–1998), communist politician
- Béatrice Vialle, aviator.
- Emmanuel Imorou, footballer.
- Émilienne Demougeot (1910–1994), historian, was born in Bourges.
- Marcel Bascoulard (1913-1978), artist, was born outside of Bourges and resided there for most of his life.
- The mother of fictional character Gabrielle Maple hailed from Bourges in The Petrified Forest (1936), endearingly mispronounced "Boorgs" by the actress playing the part, Bette Davis.
- François Jacques (1946–1992), historian, was born in Bourges.
- Arnaud Courlet de Vregille (1958-), painter, was born in Bourges.
- Belle du Berry (born Bénédicte Grimault) (1966-2020) lead singer of Paris Combo
- Patrice Gay (1973-), racing driver
- Geoffroy Tory (1480-1533), printer who introduced accents into French, was born in Bourges.

== See also ==
- Saint-Benoît-du-Sault
- Communes of the Cher department
