= Demougeot =

Demougeot is a surname. Notable people with the surname include:

- Émilienne Demougeot (1910–1994), French historian
- Loïcia Demougeot (born 2002), French ice dancer
- Marcelle Demougeot, Singer from France
