= Motin =

Motin (Cyrillic: Мотин) may refer to the following people:

Given name

- Motin Mia (born 1998), Bangladeshi footballer
- Motin Rahman, Bangladeshi film director

Surname

- Aleksandr Motin (born 1944), Soviet rower
- Cendra Motin (born 1975), French politician
- Johan Motin (born 1989), Swedish ice hockey defenceman
- Marion Motin, French dancer and choreographer
- Pierre Motin (1566–1612), French poet and translator.
