= Palais Jacques Cœur =

Private mansion in Bourges, France

Coordinates: 47.0843°N 2.3935°E

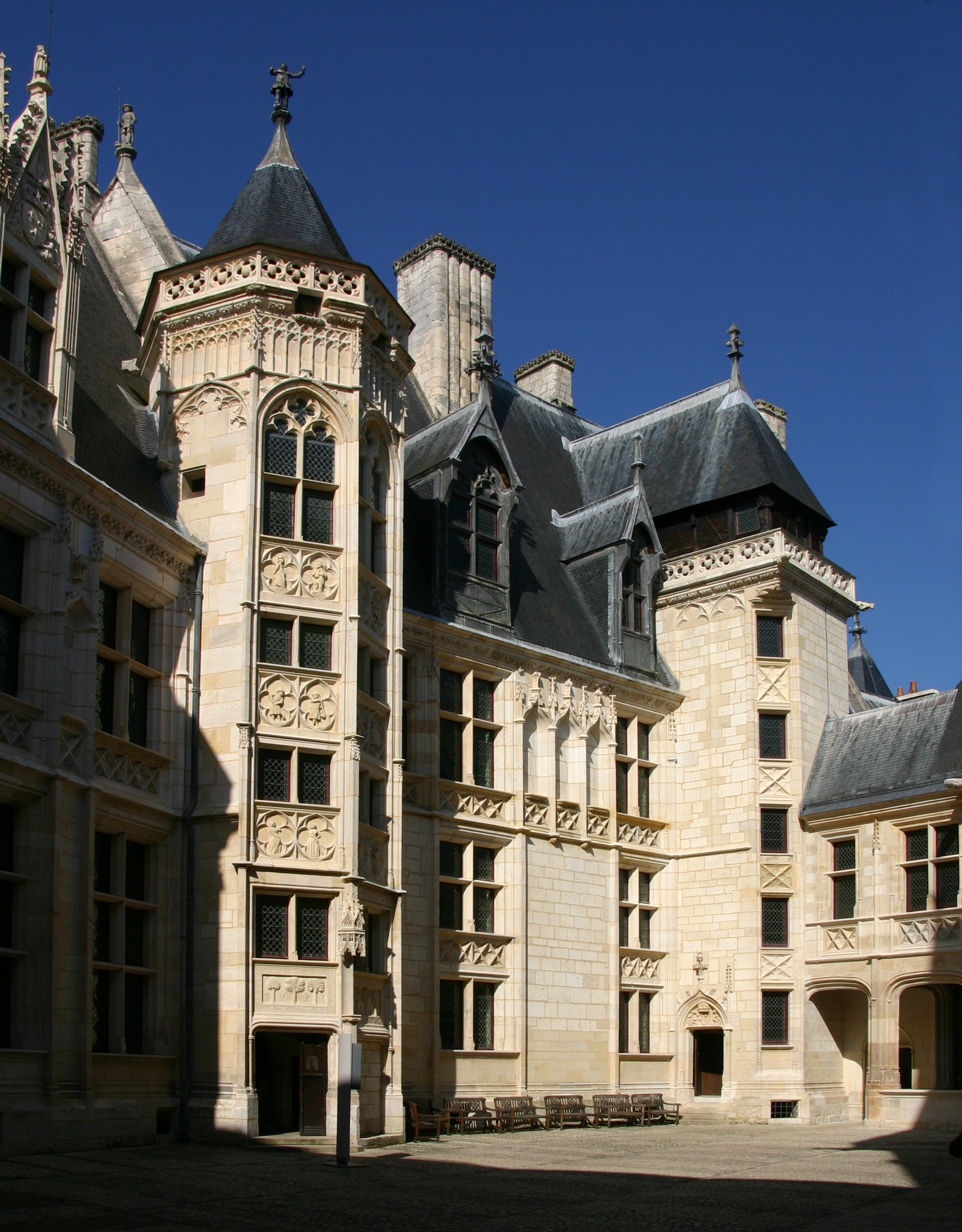
Courtyard of the Palais Jacques Cœur

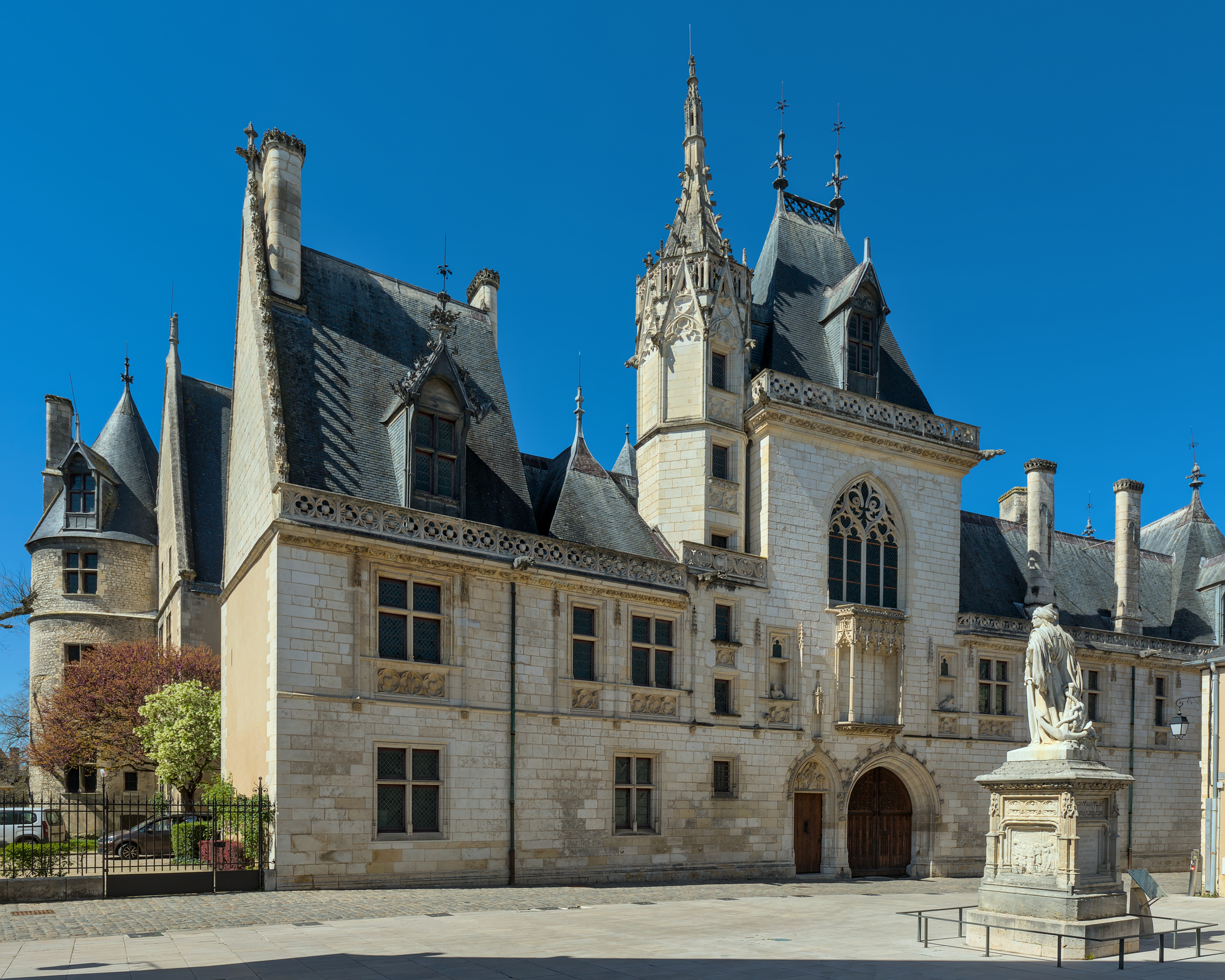
Façade on Rue Jacques-Cœur

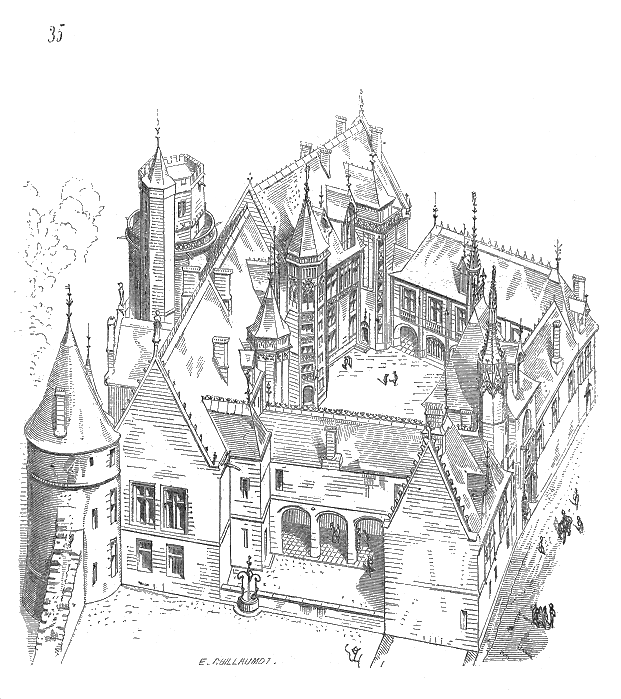
Aerial view by Eugène Viollet-le-Duc, in his Dictionnaire Raisonné de L'Architecture Française du XIe au XVIe siècle (1854–1868)

The Palais Jacques Cœur (French pronunciation: [palɛ ʒɑk kœʁ]; lit. 'Jacques Cœur Palace') is a large hôtel particulier built by Jacques Cœur for himself and his family in Bourges, France. Built and decorated in the flamboyant style, it is widely viewed as one of the most prominent examples of French civilian architecture in the 15th century.

== History ==
Jacques Cœur, who was born in Bourges and started his career there, bought the land in 1443 from Jean Belin, a canon of the Sainte-Chapelle de Bourges. Cœur did not have time to enjoy it, however, as he was arrested in 1451, tried and subsequently exiled. Construction works were completed in 1453, at a time he was imprisoned. King Charles VII seized the property as Cœur was sentenced, but restored it to Cœur's children in 1457, after Cœur himself had died in exile the year before.

In 1501, one of Jacques Cœur's grandsons sold it to Antoine Turpin, a local notable, who in turn sold it in 1552 to diplomat Claude de l'Aubespine, baron de Châteauneuf. In May 1679, it was attributed to Jean-Baptiste Colbert, who in January 1682 returned it to the City of Bourges. After that, it hosted various municipal services.

The palace suffered some damage during the French Revolution, when the large equestrian statue of Charles VII above the main entrance was destroyed. In 1820, it became a court house, hosting the tribunal d'instance and the cour d'appel of the Cher department. Prosper Mérimée identified it in 1837 as a major cultural property, and it was subsequently listed on France's first list of historic monuments of 1840. The Bourges municipality sold it to the département and the state in 1858, after which a first restoration campaign lasted until 1885.

In the 1920s, the Cher département sold its share to the French state and the court activities were discontinued. A second, much more careful restoration campaign was led by architects Henri Huignard and Robert Gauchery from 1927 to 1937. The stonework was again cleaned up in the early 2000s.

The Palais Jacques Cœur is now managed by the Centre des monuments nationaux and open to the public as a major local tourism attraction.

== See also ==
- Château de Châteaudun
- Château de Meillant
