= Parc Henri Matisse =

Park in Lille, France

Coordinates: 50°38′24″N 3°4′21″E

The Parc Henri Matisse is a public park and gardens in the Euralille district of Lille, adjacent to Lille-Europe station.

The park was designed by Gilles Clément, after he opposed plans to construct a multi-purpose urban building in this location. A principal feature is a 3,500 sqm 7m high plinth in the centre named Derborence Island. It used spoil from constructing the station, and was laid out in the same shape as Antipodes Island. The area is monitored every few years to check the diversity of wildlife, and see if certain plant species can survive or thrive there.
