= Barbara Harmer =

Airline pilot

- Born: 14 September 1953; Loughton, United Kingdom
- Died: 20 February 2011 (aged 57); Chichester, United Kingdom
- Citizenship: British
- Known for: First qualified female Concorde pilot
- Website: heritageconcorde.com/barbara-harmer

Barbara Harmer (14 September 1953 – 20 February 2011) was the first qualified female Concorde pilot.

== Early life ==
Born in Staples Road, Loughton, Essex, the youngest of four daughters, she was raised in Bognor Regis, a seaside resort in West Sussex, England, where she attended a convent school. She left school aged 15 to pursue a career in hairdressing.

== Aviation career ==
Harmer's first experience in the aviation industry was five years later when she left hairdressing to begin training as an air traffic controller at London Gatwick Airport. When she took on the job of air traffic controller Harmer decided to study for A Levels with the intention of doing a law degree. She obtained A levels in Geography, English Law, Constitutional Law and Politics. She also began flying lessons, gained her Private Pilot Licence (PPL) and became an instructor at Goodwood Flying School. Harmer studied for two years to gain a Commercial Pilot Licence (CPL), which she obtained in May 1982. She then made more than 100 applications before securing a job as pilot at Genair, a small commuter airline based at Humberside Airport.

In March 1984, Harmer joined British Caledonian and flew BAC One-Elevens for three years. She then started flying the long haul McDonnell Douglas DC-10. In 1987, British Caledonian merged with British Airways, the airline operating Concorde in the UK. At that time, British Airways employed more than 3000 pilots, but only 60 of them were women and no woman had ever piloted Concorde.

== Flying Concorde ==
Harmer was chosen to undergo the intensive six-month conversion course for Concorde in 1992.

On 25 March 1993 Harmer became the first qualified female Concorde pilot and later that year made her first Concorde flight as First Officer to New York City's John F. Kennedy International Airport (JFK). Jacqueline Auriol was the first woman to fly Concorde as a test pilot.

By the time Concorde was withdrawn from service in October 2003, Harmer had served 10 years as a pilot flying regular scheduled services. In 2001, an Air France pilot, Béatrice Vialle, had become the second of only two women to fly Concorde on regular routes by making some 35 trips between Paris and New York before the service was withdrawn. After Concorde, Harmer converted to the Boeing 777 until taking voluntary redundancy in 2009.

== Later life ==
Harmer's interests were not all in the air as she was a qualified commercial yachtmaster, often taking part in international events commanding fellow Concorde crew members and winning several races. She also created a Mediterranean-styled garden at her home in Felpham, West Sussex overlooking the English Channel. Harmer intended to take part in a transatlantic event in 2013 in her Archambault 35 sailing boat, but succumbed to ovarian cancer. She died at St. Wilfrid's Hospice, Chichester, aged 57.
