= Béatrice Vialle =

French retired aviator (born 1961)

- Born: 4 August 1961 (age 65); Bourges, Cher, France
- Education: École nationale de l'aviation civile
- Known for: Only French-qualified female Concorde pilot and one of the two female Concorde operational pilots
- Aviation career
- First flight: Robin HR 100 Tiara
- Famous flights: Final Air France Concorde flight, AF 4332, with fare-paying passengers on board. 31 May 2003.
- Flight license: June 1984, Professional Pilot 1st Class; Saint-Yan, Saône-et-Loire

Béatrice Vialle (born 4 August 1961 at Bourges) is a French retired aviator, one of the two operational female Concorde pilots and the first French female pilot on a supersonic airliner.

== Biography ==
Graduating from École nationale de l'aviation civile (the French civil aviation university; named as "airline transport pilot student" 1981), she started her career at Air Littoral, flying an Embraer EMB 110 Bandeirante. She moved to Air France in 1985, where she flew an Airbus A320 and a Boeing 747 before becoming qualified on Concorde, on 24 July 2000.

She made her first commercial flight on 19 November 2001 and so became one of the two female Concorde pilots (with the Briton Barbara Harmer) and the first French female pilot on a supersonic airliner. (Frenchwoman Jacqueline Auriol was the first woman who flew Concorde, but this was as a test pilot.) In total Vialle made 45 supersonic flights Paris-New York City and 3 trips above the Atlantic Ocean. After the end of her Concorde flights (31 May 2003), she became a Captain flying Boeing 747-400s.

She retired after one final flight on 1 August 2026.

== Bibliography ==
- Académie nationale de l'air et de l'espace, Les français du ciel, dictionnaire historique, 2005, Le Cherche midi éditeur, 782p., p. 518, VIALLE, Béatrice, ISBN 2-7491-0415-7
- Who's Who in France, 2012, 2307 p., notice « Vialle, Béatrice », ISBN 978-2-85784-052-7
