= Geoffroy Cœur =

15th-century French nobleman

- Baron of Saint-Fargeau, Lord of La Chaussee, etc.
- Arms of the Cœur family
- Died: October 11, 1488; Paris, 48°51'20"N 2°19'22"E
- Buried: Chapel of the Collège des Bons-Enfants
- Wife: Isabeau Bureau (died 1521)
- Issue: Jacques II Cœur (died 1505), Jeanne Cœur, Marie Cœur (1473–1557), Germaine Cœur (1475–1526)
- Father: Jacques Cœur
- Mother: Macée de Léodepart

Geoffroy Cœur (/kɜːr/, French: [kœʁ], Geoffroi, Godfredus Cordis; died 1488) was a French nobleman and son of the famously wealthy merchant and businessman Jacques Cœur by his wife Macée de Léodepart. He was baron of Saint-Fargeau and lord of La Chaussee, Angerville, Beaumont, and Géronville, as well as cupbearer of Louis XI. In 1463 he married Isabeau, daughter of Jean Bureau, lord of Montglas and la Houssaye-en-Brie and master of artillery under Charles VII.

Geoffroy, by Letters Patent of Charles VII (1457) and more complete restitution under Louis XI, was able to recover a part of his father's vast property (and rehabilitate his memory). However, legal proceedings over the lands acquired by Antoine de Chabannes would not conclude until 1489, with negotiations between Isabeau and Chabannes' son.

Despite being commonly referred to as the Maison de Jacques Cœur, the house on the Rue des Archives in Paris is generally viewed as more likely having been built or acquired by Geoffroy.
