= Émilienne Demougeot =

French historian (1910–1994)

- Born: 1910; Bourges
- Died: 19 June 1994 (aged 83–84); Montpellier
- Occupation: Historian
- Years active: Specialist in the history of the Late Antiquity and Early Christianity times.

Émilienne Demougeot (1910 in Bourges – 19 June 1994 in Montpellier) was a French historian, a specialist of Late Antiquity and Early Christianity. She was one of the first women professors of history at a French university, and the first woman professor at the Faculty of Letters at the University of Montpellier.

== Life ==
She attended elementary and high school in Guadeloupe from 1917 to 1922, then in Tangier in 1925–1926. Once a history teacher, she taught in high school before the war, and then as an assistant at the Sorbonne. She defended her thesis, De l’Unité à la division de l’Empire romain. Essai sur le gouvernement impérial (395-410), in 1949.

She was a professor of ancient history at the Faculty of Letters of Montpellier from 1957 to her retirement in 1978. She won the Prix Thérouanne in 1952 for her work, De l’unité à la division de l'Empire Romain. With the prize she was awarded 2,000 francs. She left a great work especially the monumental Formation de l’Europe et les invasions barbares. She bequeathed her library to the library of ancient history of the Paul-Valéry University in Montpellier.

== Bibliography ==
- 1988: L'Empire romain et les Barbares d'Occident (IVe-VIIe siècle) : scripta varia (in French). Paris: Publications de la Sorbonne. 1988. p. 420. ISBN 2-859-44177-8.
- 1982: Le Colosse de Barletta, Mélanges de l'École française de Rome. Antiquité, T. 94, n°2, 1982, p. 951-978 read on Persée
- 1980: in collaboration with Michel Christol, André Chastagnol, Mélanges de numismatique, d'archéologie et d'histoire : Offerts à Jean Lafaurie, Société française de numismatique, 286 pages
- 1969: La Formation de l'Europe et les invasions barbares. Collection historique (in French). Vol. I. Paris: Aubier. p. 616., online, online.
- 1969: La Formation de l'Europe et les invasions barbares. Collection historique (in French). Vol. II. Paris: Aubier. p. 410. ISBN 2-7007-0146-1.
- 1969: La Formation de l'Europe et les invasions barbares. Collection historique (in French). Vol. III. Aubier. 1979. p. 519. ISBN 2-7007-0146-1.
- 1968: Remarques sur les débuts du culte impérial en Narbonnaise (Offprint from Provence historique, v. 18, fasc. 71) [The Sackler Library, University of Oxford, has a signed copy of this text)
- 1954: 'A propos des interventions du pape Innocent Ier dans la politique séculière' (Presses Universitaires de France) Revue historique [offprint] pp. 23–38
- 1953: Notes sur l'évacuation des troupes romaines en Alsace au début du Ve siècle (Delle: [Institut des hautes études alsaciennes])
- 1951: De l'unité à la division de l'Empire romain, Paris, Adrien-Maisonneuve, 618 pages
