= Jacques Cœur =

15th-century French government official and merchant

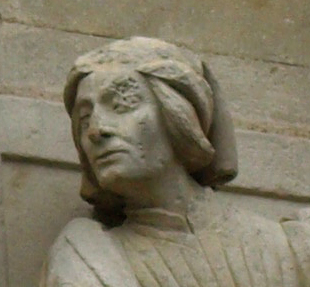
Presumed portrait of Jacques Cœur, at his palace in Bourges

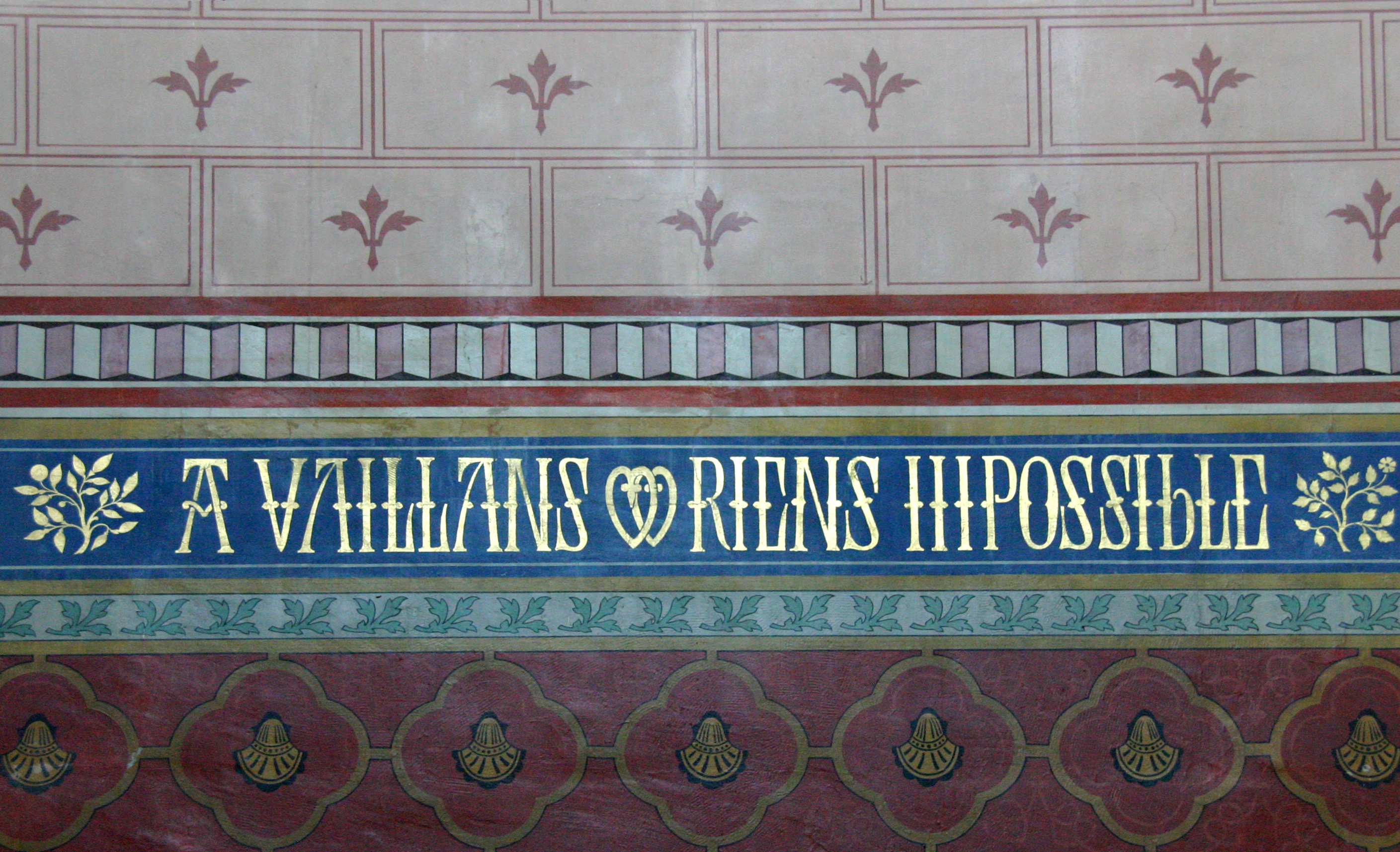
Jacques Cœur's motto, "To the brave hearts nothing is impossible" (à vaillans cœurs riens impossible), in the Bourges palace's chapel. The word cœurs is displayed ideogrammatically

Jacques Cœur (/kɜːr/; French: [ʒɑk kœʁ]; c. 1395 – 25 November 1456) was a French government official and state-sponsored merchant whose personal fortune became legendary and led to his eventual disgrace. He initiated regular trade routes between France and the Levant. His memory retains iconic status in Bourges, where he built a palatial house that is preserved to this day.

== Family and early life ==
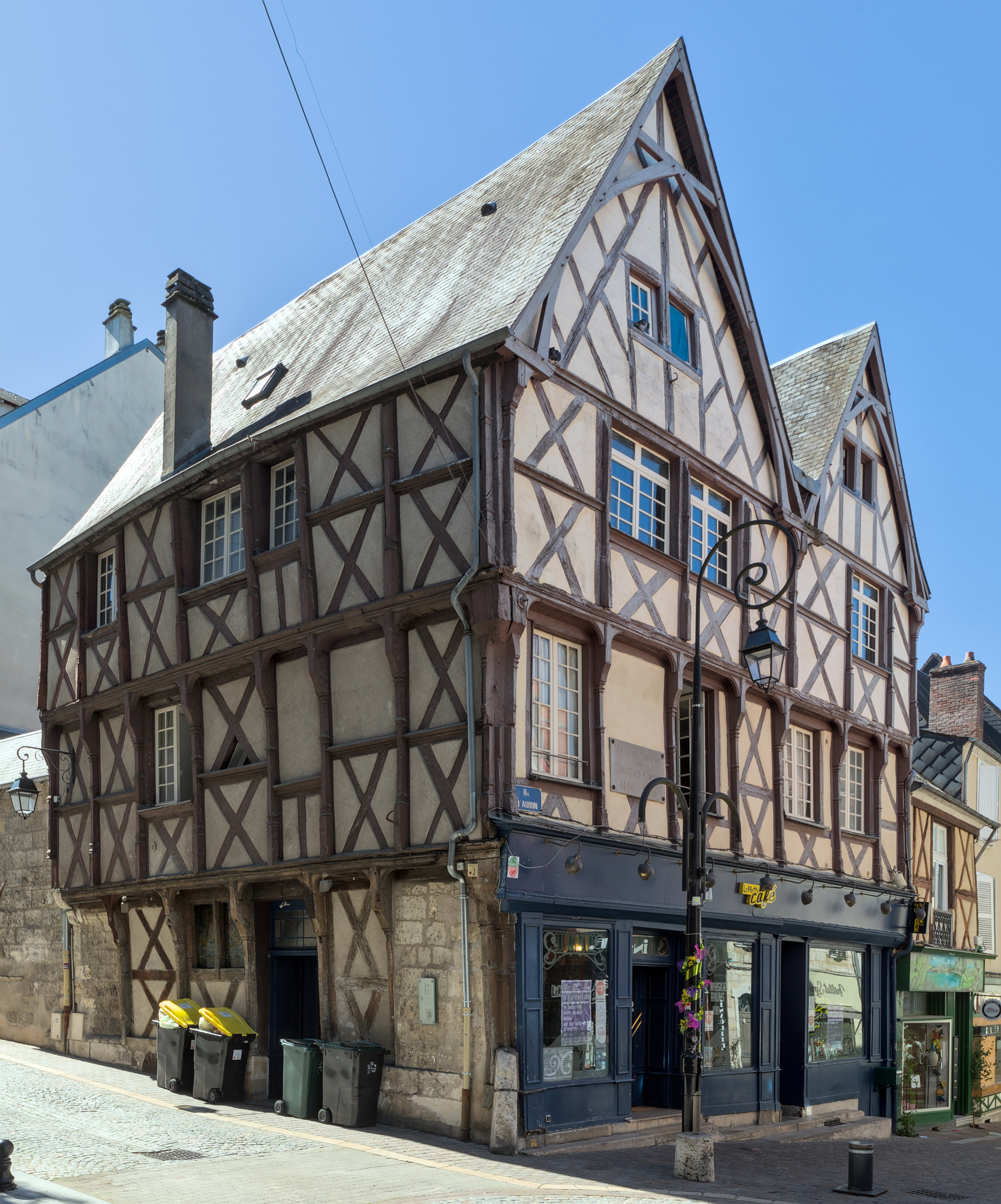
Old house in Bourges that was formerly thought to be Jacques Cœur's birthplace

He was born in Bourges, the city where his father, Pierre Cœur, was a rich merchant. Jacques is first heard of around 1418, when he married Macée de Léodepart, daughter of Lambert de Léodepart, an influential citizen, provost of Bourges and a former valet of John, Duke of Berry.

About 1429 he formed a commercial partnership with two brothers named Godard; and in 1432 he was at Damascus, buying and bartering, and transporting the wares of the Levant—gall-nuts, wools and silks, mohair, brocades and carpets—to the interior of France by way of Narbonne. In the same year he established himself at Montpellier, and there began the gigantic operations which have made him illustrious among financiers. While specific details are lacking, it is certain that in a few years he placed his country in a position to contend fairly well with the great trading republics of Italy, and acquired such a reputation as to be able, despite being a common merchant, to render material assistance to the knights of Rhodes and to Venice itself.

== Rise to prominence ==
Coat of arms adopted by Jacques Cœur, with three St James shells for Jacques and three hearts for Cœur

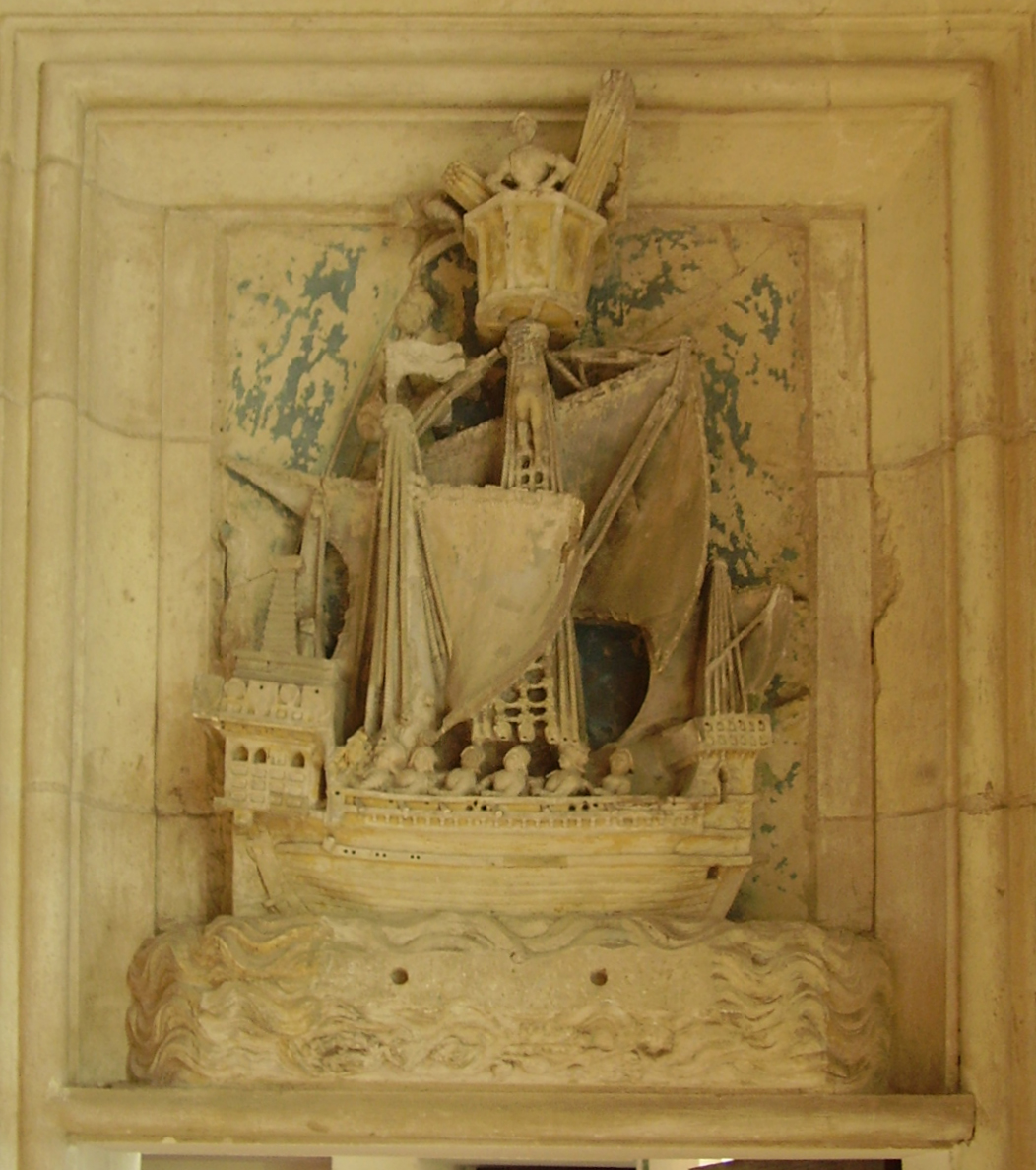
Overdoor sculpture of one of Jacques Cœur's galleys, in his palace in Bourges

In 1436, Cœur was summoned to Paris by Charles VII and made master of the mint. This post was of great importance, and the duties onerous. The country was deluged with base monies from three reigns, charged with superscriptions both in French and English, and Charles was determined to make sweeping reforms. In this design he was ably seconded by the merchant, who, in fact, inspired or prepared all the ordinances concerning the coinage of France issued between 1435 and 1451. In 1438, he was made steward of the royal expenditure; in 1441 he and his family were ennobled by letters patent. He chose the motto A vaillans cuers riens impossible, "To a valiant heart, nothing is impossible". In 1444, he was sent as one of the royal commissioners to preside over the new parliament of Languedoc in Pézenas, where his house can still be seen, a position he held until the day of his disgrace. In 1445, his agents in the East negotiated a treaty between the sultan of Egypt and the knights of Rhodes; and in 1447, at his instance, Jean de Village, his nephew by marriage, was charged with a mission to Egypt. The results were most important; concessions were obtained which greatly improved the position of the French consuls in the Levant, and that influence in the East was thereby founded which, though often interrupted, was for several centuries a chief commercial glory for France. In the same year, Cœur assisted in an embassy to Amadeus VIII, former Duke of Savoy, who had been chosen Pope as Felix V by the council of Basel and in 1448 he represented the French king at the court of Pope Nicholas V where he was able to arrange an agreement between Nicholas and Amadeus, and so end the papal schism. Nicholas treated him with the utmost distinction, lodged him in the papal palace, and gave him special licence to traffic with the infidels. From about this time he made advances to Charles to carry on his wars and in 1449, after fighting at the King's side throughout the campaign, he entered Rouen in Charles' triumphal procession.

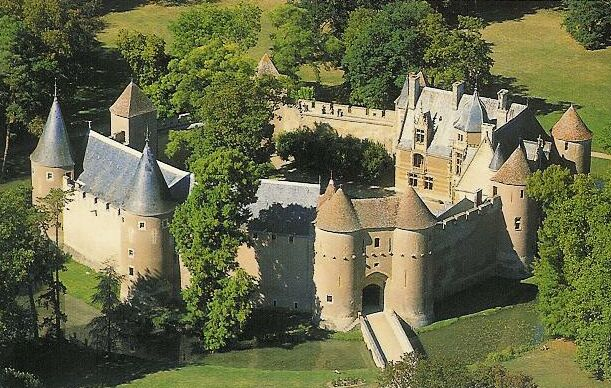
Château d'Ainay-le-Vieil, owned by Jacques Cœur between 1435 and 1451

At this point, Cœur's glory was at its height. He had represented France in three embassies, and had supplied funding for the king's successful reconquest of Normandy. He was invested with various offices of state, and possessed a fortune that was viewed as colossal and unprecedented by his contemporaries. He had 300 managers in his employ, and business houses in many of the chief cities of France. He had built houses and chapels, and had founded colleges in Paris, at Montpellier and at Bourges. The Palais Jacques-Cœur in Bourges was exceptionally magnificent and remains today one of the finest monuments of the Middle Ages in France. He also built a sacristy and a family burial chapel in Bourges Cathedral. His brother Nicolas Cœur was made Bishop of Luçon, his sister married Jean Bochetel, the King's secretary, his daughter married the son of the Viscount of Bourges, and his son Jean Cœur became Archbishop of Bourges.

Cœur also actively acquired titles and properties during his heyday: e.g. the lordship of Ainay-le-Vieil in 1435, the Château de Boisy by Pouilly-les-Nonains in 1447, the Château de Menetou-Salon and the lordship of Barlieu in 1448, the lordship of Puisaye in 1450, the Château de Maubranche in 1451.

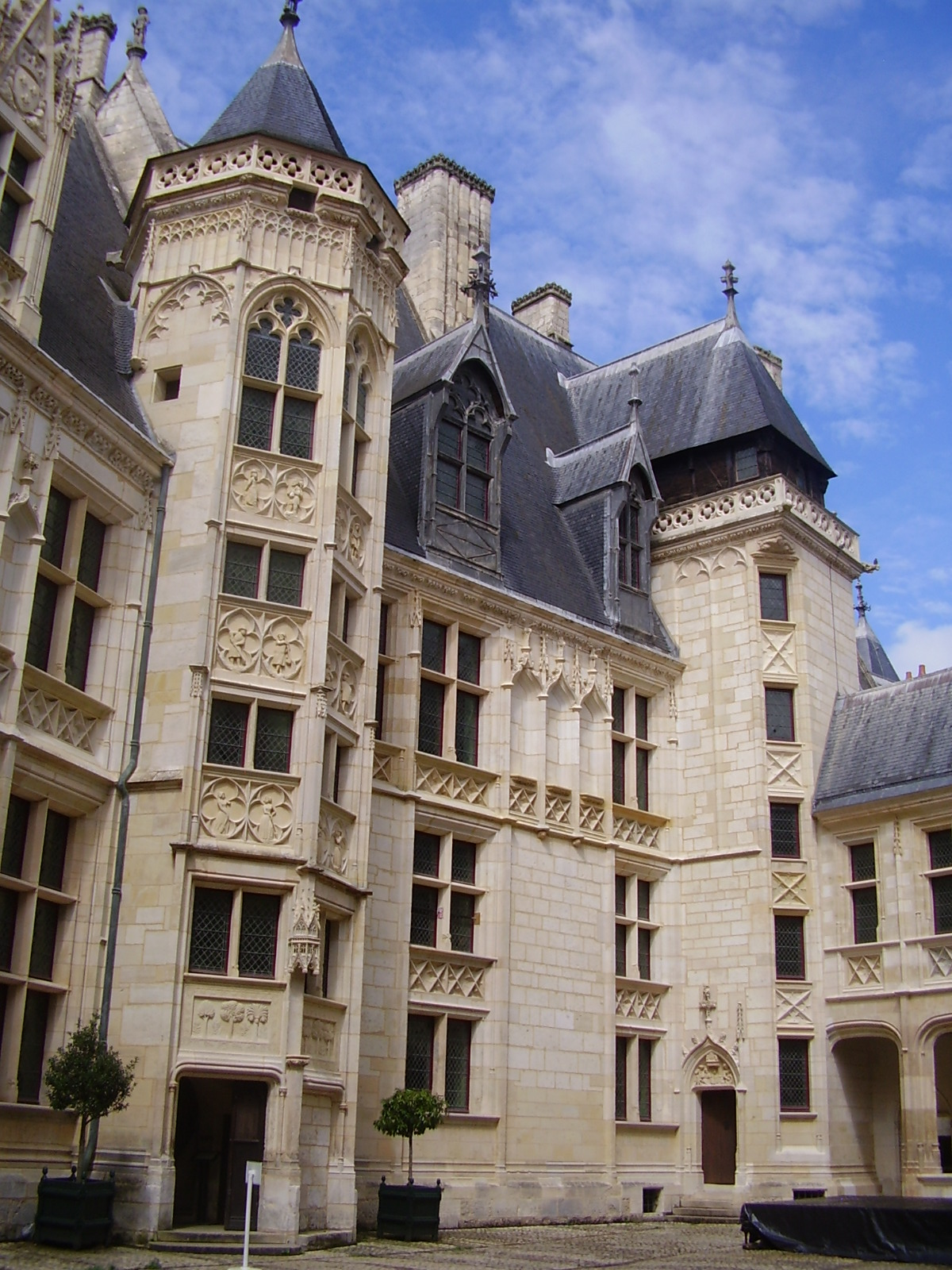
Palace of Jacques Cœur in Bourges, courtyard

== Downfall ==
Cœur's huge monopoly also caused his ruin. Dealing in everything (money and arms, furs and jewels, brocades and wool), and acting as a broker, banker, and farmer, he had absorbed much of the trade of the country, and merchants complained they could make no profit because of him. He had lent money to needy courtiers, to members of the royal family, and to the King himself, and his debtors, jealous of his wealth, were eager for a chance to cause his downfall.

In February 1450 Agnès Sorel, the King's mistress, suddenly died. Eighteen months later it was rumoured that she had been poisoned, and a lady of the court who owed money to Jacques Cœur, Jeanne de Vendôme, wife of François de Montberon, and an Italian, Jacques Colonna, formally accused him of having poisoned her. There was not even a pretext for such a charge, but for this and other alleged crimes, King Charles VII on 31 July 1451 gave orders for his arrest and for the seizure of his goods, reserving for himself a large sum of money for the war in Guienne. Commissioners extraordinary, several of which were among Cœur's enemies at the royal court, were chosen to conduct the trial and an inquiry began, the judges in which were either the prisoner's debtors or the holders of his forfeited estates. He was accused of having paid French gold and ingots to Muslim infidels, of coining light money, of kidnapping oarsmen for his galleys, of sending back a Christian slave who had taken sanctuary on board one of his ships, and of committing frauds and exactions in Languedoc to the King's prejudice. He defended himself with all the energy of his nature. His innocence was manifest but a conviction was necessary, and in spite of strenuous efforts on the part of his friends, after twenty-two months of confinement in five prisons, he was condemned to do public penance for his fault, to pay the king a sum equal to about £1,000,000 in 1911, (about £98.8 MM in June 2024) and to remain a prisoner till full satisfaction had been obtained. His sentence also included confiscation of all his property, and exile during His Majesty's pleasure.

On 5 June 1453 the sentence took effect. At Poitiers, the shame of making honourable amends was accomplished and for nearly three years nothing is known of him. It is probable that he remained in prison. Meanwhile, his vast possessions were distributed among Charles VII's favorite courtiers.

== Escape, papal patronage and death ==
In 1455 Jacques Cœur contrived to escape from France into Provence. He was pursued, but a party headed by Jean de Village and two of his old managers, carried him off to Tarascon, whence, by way of Marseille, Nice and Pisa, he managed to reach Rome. He was honorably and joyfully received by Nicholas V, who was fitting out an expedition against the Turks. On the death of Nicholas, Calixtus III continued his work, and made his guest, Cœur, captain of a fleet of sixteen galleys sent to the relief of Rhodes. Cœur set out on this expedition, but was taken ill on the island of Chios, and died there on 25 November 1456. After his death Charles VII showed himself well disposed to the family, and allowed Jacques Cœur's sons to inherit whatever was left of their father's wealth.

== Aftermath ==
Following Cœur's disgrace and death, his heirs attempted to recover some of his former properties in legal procedures that lasted several decades. They had partial success when Antoine de Chabannes, who had appropriated and bought Cœur's domains in Puisaye, himself lost royal favor upon the accession of King Louis XI in the early 1460s. The reversal, however, was short-lived, and Chabannes recovered all the titles and properties by special provisions of the Treaty of Conflans in 1465. The procedures were finally settled in 1489 between the Cœurs and Jean de Chabannes, Antoine's son and sole male heir.

== Legacy ==
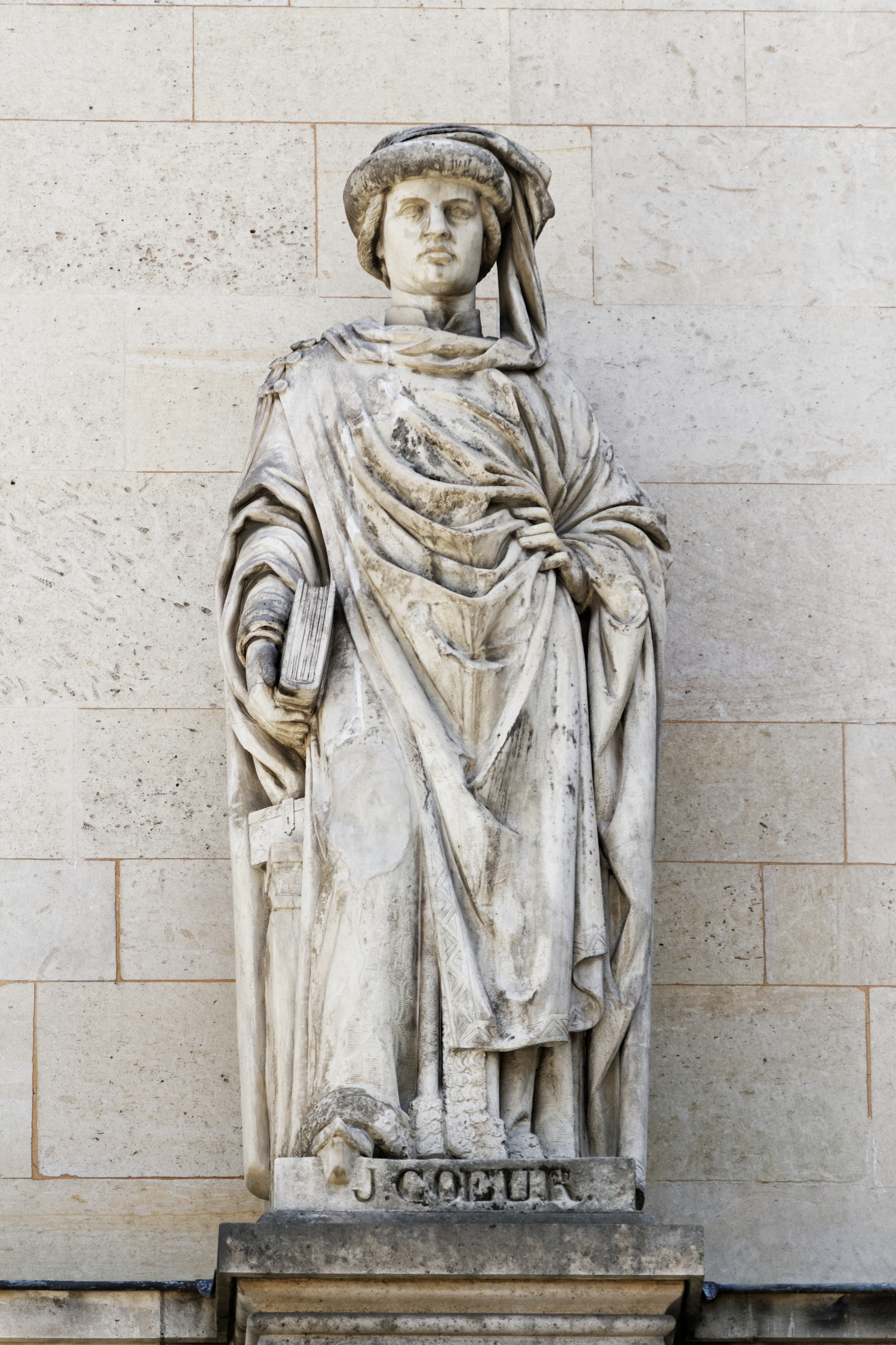
Statue of Jacques Cœur by Élias Robert in the Louvre, early 1850s

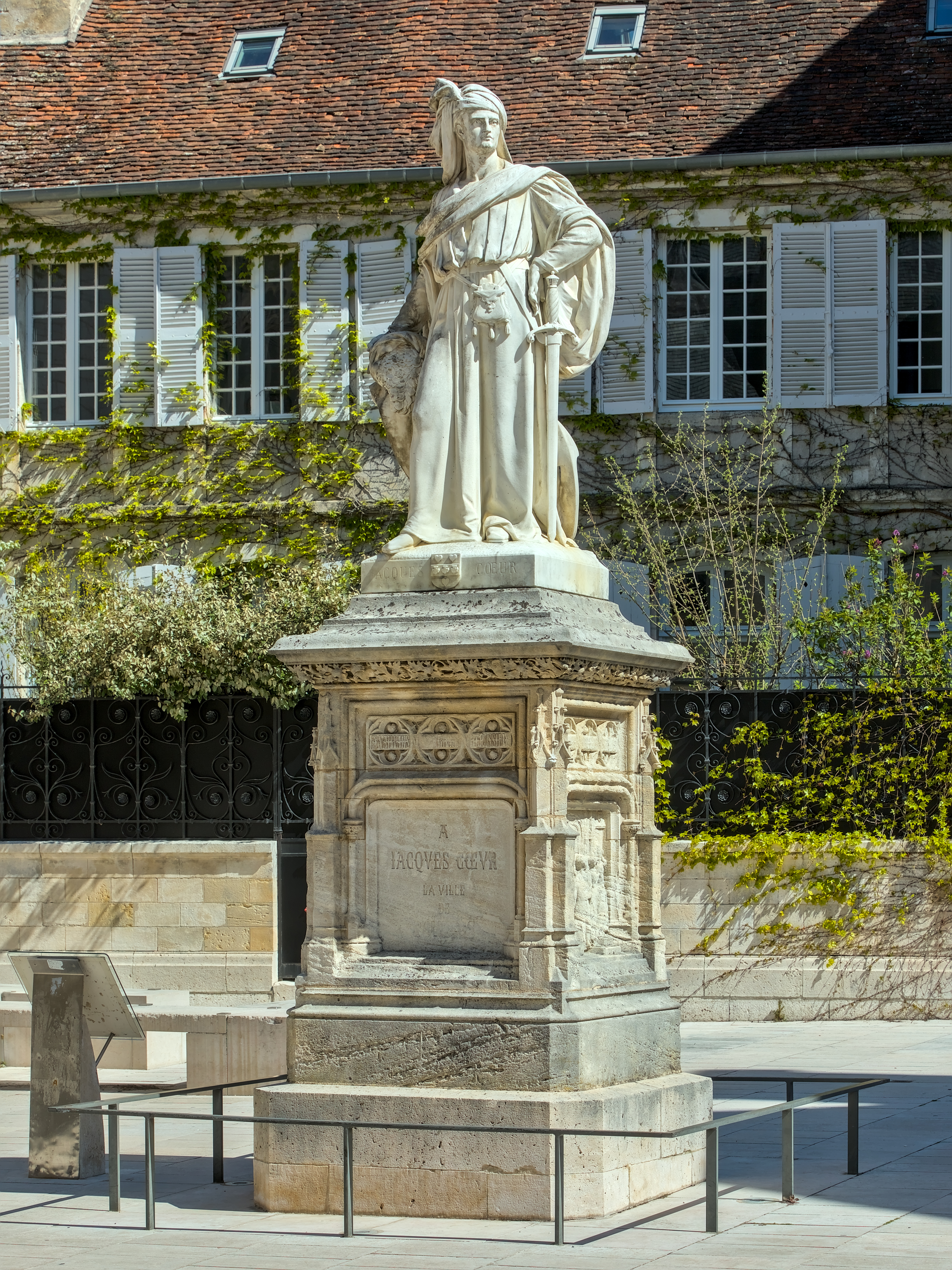
Monument to Jacques Cœur by Auguste Préault in Bourges, late 1870s

The urban palace Jacques Cœur had built for himself in Bourges, or Palais Jacques-Cœur, is a major monument of French 15th-century civil architecture. It was converted into a court house in the 19th century, and carefully restored in the 20th century.

Other buildings are allegedly or inaccurately associated with Jacques Cœur. The maison de Jacques Cœur in Paris is generally viewed as having been built or purchased by Jacques Cœur's son Geoffrey, thus a misnomer. Other ancient houses are known as maison de Jacques Cœur, in Pézenas, Sancerre, and L'Arbresle.

During the Second French Empire, Jacques Cœur was celebrated as a precursor of the policy of economic expansion promoted by Napoleon III. He was portrayed by Élias Robert as one of a series of statues of illustrious Frenchmen in Napoleon III's Louvre expansion. Another public statue of Jacques Cœur, by sculptor Auguste Préault, was erected in 1879 in Bourges in front of the entrance to his palace.

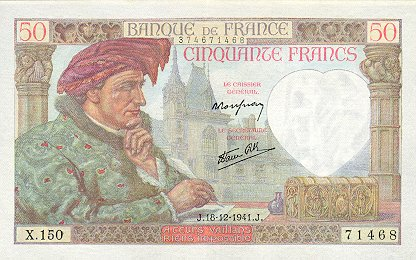
Banknote featuring Jacques Cœur, 1940

He was portrayed on a French banknote, the Billet de 50 francs Jacques Cœur designed at the end of the Third Republic, in use under Vichy France and until June 1945.

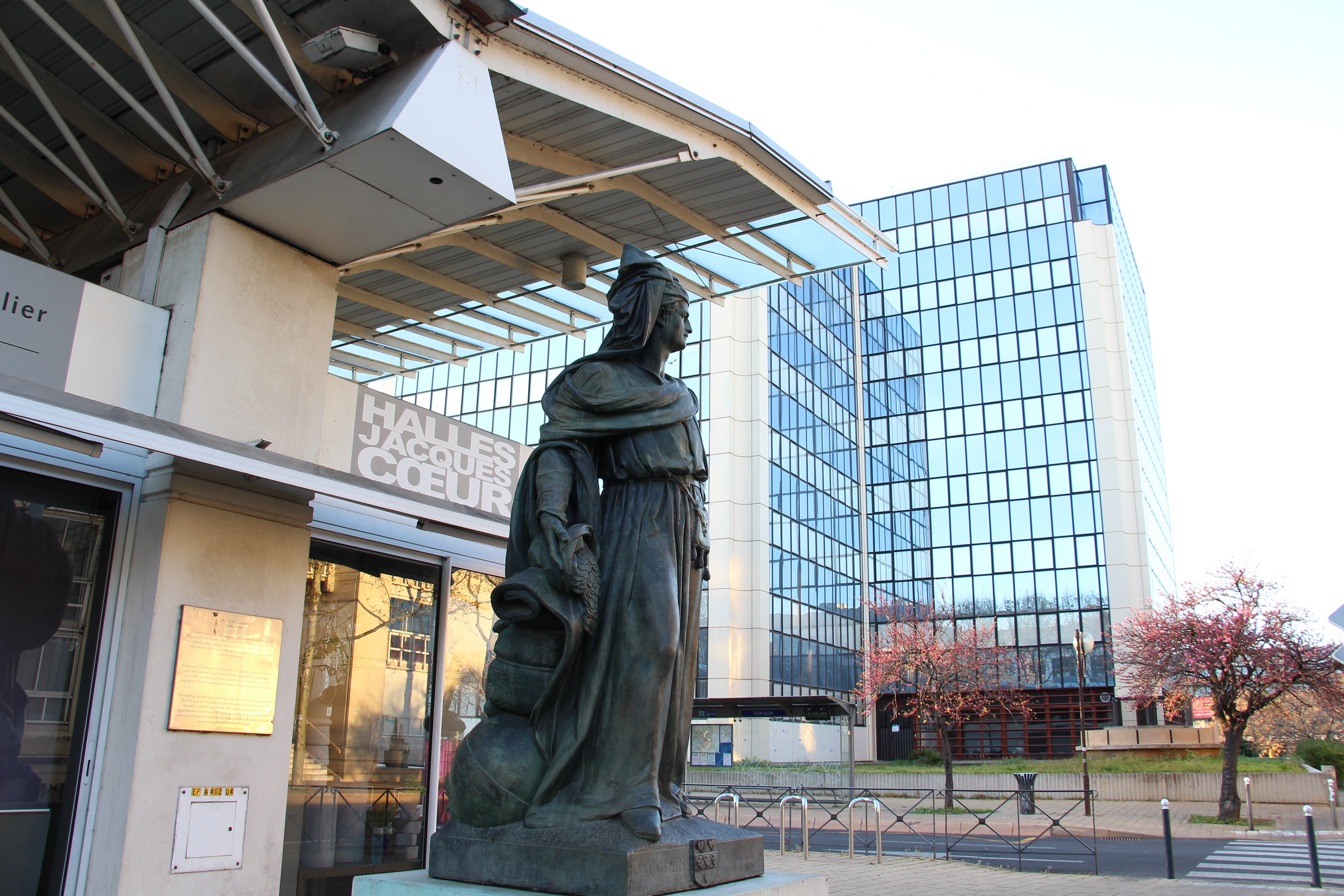
Replica of Préault's statue of Jacques Cœur in Montpellier, in front of a marketplace also named after him (Halles Jacques Cœur)

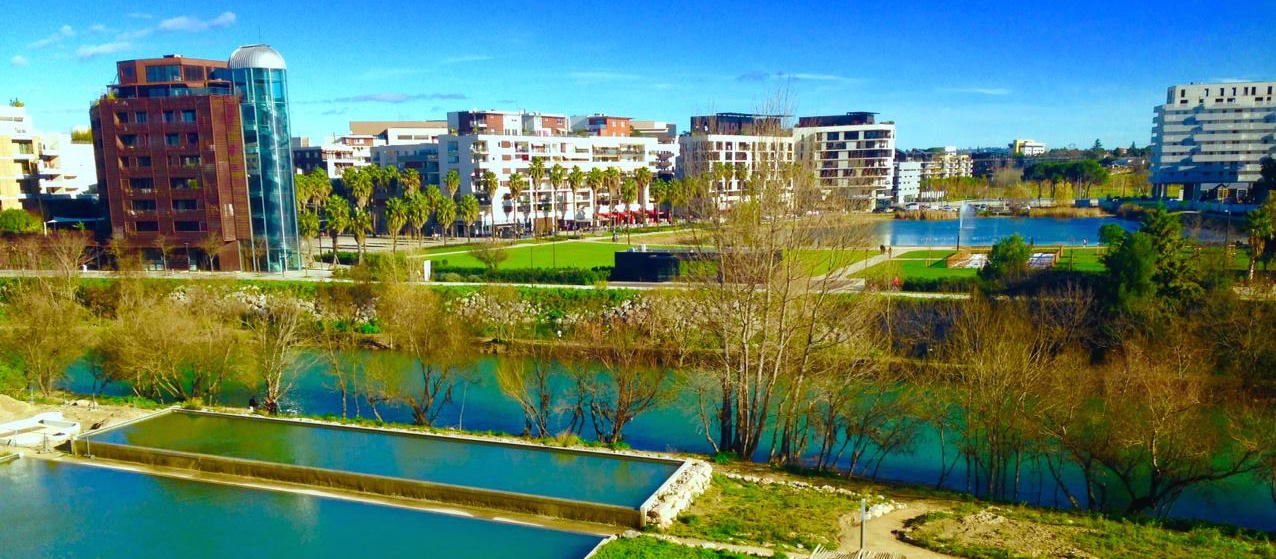
Jacques Cœur neighborhood in Montpellier, around the Bassin Jacques Cœur

Streets and squares named after Jacques Cœur exist in numerous French towns and cities, including Bourges, Montpellier, and Paris. Bourges honored its native son in multiple instances, e.g. the Lycée Jacques-Cœur (Cœur High School) and the Théâtre Jacques Cœur (Cœur Theater). In Montpellier, Jacques Cœur is associated with the development of the local port of Lattes. Several projects were named after him in the late 20th and early 21st centuries, as the city expanded towards the sea along the river Lez. These include a marketplace in the Antigone neighborhood along the Lez; an artificial lake, the Bassin Jacques Cœur in the city's new Port Marianne district; and a theater in Lattes.

The Route Jacques Coeur is a scenic route that links together a number of sights and castles near Bourges, many of which however have no historical associations with Jacques Cœur.

== Assessment ==
In a 1997 biography, French historian Jacques Heers revises the established view in French historiography, according to which Jacques Cœur exhibited outstanding skills and success as a merchant. He notes that there is no evidence that Cœur's ventures, e.g. in mining near Lyon, were particularly profitable, and that the fleet he established for Levantine commerce was modest in size (never more than four galleys) compared with those of prominent Italian or Catalan merchants. Instead, Heers suggests that Cœur's success was overwhelmingly due to his position at the royal court, and that his riches came from leveraging his privileged access to state resources. Thus, Heers implies that, rather than a brilliant merchant, Cœur is best viewed as a skilled technocrat and a predecessor to the likes of Nicolas Fouquet or Jean-Baptiste Colbert.

== Cultural references ==
François Villon, in his poem Épitaphe, refers to Cœur's fabled wealth:

De pauvreté me guermantant,
Souventes fois me dit le cœur :
"Homme, ne te doulouse tant
Et ne démène tel douleur:
Si tu n'as tant qu'eut Jacques Cœur,
Mieux vaux vivre sous gros bureau
Pauvre, qu'avoir été seigneur
Et pourrir sous riche tombeau."

To ease my poverty,
my heart sometimes says to me:
"Don't fret so
and go crazy with pain:
If you haven't as much as Jacques Cœur,
it's better to live in your coarse burrel,
poor, than to have been lord
and rot in your rich tomb."

Jacques Cœur appears in Fulcanelli's Mystère des Cathédrales (1926) where the "master alchemist" speculates that Cœur was a successful alchemist or associated with alchemists and that he was a silversmith in the literal sense, i.e. that he could transmute base metals into small quantities of silver.

Jacques Cœur (referred to simply as “Monsieur Jacques”) appears in Mikhail Bulgakov's novel The Master and Margarita as the first guest at Woland's grand ball. He was the subject of a novel by Thomas Costain, Canadien-American Journalist/Historical Fiction Writer called "The Moneyman" in 1947. He is the titular protagonist of Le Grand Cœur, a 2012 novel by Jean-Christophe Rufin who was also born in Bourges.
