= Claude Vasconi =

French architect (1940–2009)

Claude Vasconi (24 June 1940 – 8 December 2009) was a French architect.

Vasconi was born in Rosheim, and was educated at the Ecole Nationale Supérieure des Arts et de l'Industrie in Strasbourg. In 1964, he set up office in Paris. After designing two key projects as a young architect, Forum des Halles in the centre of Paris and the building of the Préfecture in Cergy-Pontoise, he became one of the most sought-after architects in France, with major projects in Montpellier, Strasbourg and Saint-Nazaire. He died in Paris, aged 69.

Claude Vasconi has been credited as the pioneer proponent of the concept of "Angelina"-style cellular steel beams.

== Selected works ==
- 2008 Library in Genk, Belgium
- 2007 Nouvel Hôpital Civil (hospital) in Strasbourg
- 2002 Palais de Justice (courthouse) in Grenoble
- 2002 L'Onde Cultural Centre in Vélizy-Villacoublay
- 2001 Grand Bateau office building in Düsseldorf, Germany
- 1995-1998 Grand Ballon observatory, on top of the Grand Ballon, the highest point of the Vosges mountains
- 1995 Tower above the Lille Europe train station, Euralille, Lille
- 1994-1999 Refurbishment of the Borsig Halle, a former locomotive factory in Berlin, Germany
- 1990-1994 Congress Centre in Reims
- 1989 Building of the Bas-Rhin département in Strasbourg
- 1989 Thomson factory in Valenciennes
- 1988-1993 Cultural Centre La Filature in Mulhouse
- 1988 The Corum complex in Montpellier
- 1987-1989 Shopping Mall Le Paquebot in Saint-Nazaire
- 1984 TDF Tower in Romainville
- 1979 Renault factory in Boulogne-Billancourt
- 1979 Forum des Halles with Georges Pencreac'h.
