= André Chastagnol =

French epigrapher and historian (1920–1996)

- Born: 21 February 1920; Paris, France
- Died: 2 September 1996 (aged 76); Paris, France
- Occupation: Historian
- Years active: 1950—1986

André Chastagnol (21 February 1920 – 2 September 1996) was a French historian, specializing in Latin epigraphy and literature.

After teaching at the Universities of Algiers, Rennes and Paris-X, he finished his career as a professor at the Paris-Sorbonne University. His two theses were devoted to the Praefectus urbi. He succeeded Hans-Georg Pflaum at the head of the Latin epigraphy seminar of the École pratique des hautes études where Michel Christol, Xavier Loriot, and François Jacques were among his students.

His various works on the Lower Roman Empire and Late Antiquity are authoritative. He was long interested in the Augustan History, of which he provided translation and helped to improve the study. His large personal library, bequeathed to the Sorbonne, is now incorporated into the Bibliothèque Serpente.

André Chastagnol was a member of the Société des Antiquaires de France.

== Selected works of Chastagnol ==
André Chastagnol wrote about 200 books and articles devoted to general history, Gaul and North Africa during Antiquity, including:

- La préfecture urbaine à Rome sous le Bas-Empire (Publications de la Faculté des Lettres d'Alger. Vol. 34). Presses Universitaires de France, Paris 1960.
- Les Fastes de la Préfecture de Rome au Bas-Empire (Études prosopographiques. Band 2). Nouvelles Éditions Latines, Paris 1962.
- Le Sénat romain sous le règne d'Odoacre. Recherches sur l'épigraphie du Colisée au Ve siècle (Antiquitas. Series 3, vol. 3). Rudolf Habelt, Bonn 1966.
- Le Bas-Empire. Armand Colin, Paris 1969. 2. Auflage 1981 Antiquitas. Series 4, vol. 6). Rudolf Habelt, Bonn 1970.
- La fin du monde antique. De Stilicon à Justinien (V siècle et début VI). Recueil de textes présentés et traduits. Nouvelles Éditions Latines, Paris 1976.
- L'Album municipal de Timgad (Antiquitas. Series 3, vol. 22). Rudolf Habelt, Bonn 1978.
- L'évolution politique, sociale et économique du monde romain de Dioclétien à Julien. La mise en place du régime du Bas-Empire (284–363) (= Regards sur l'histoire. vol. 47). Société d'édition d'enseignement supérieur, Paris 1982.
- L'Italie et l'Afrique au Bas-Empire. Études administratives et prosopographiques. Scripta varia. Presses universitaires, Lille 1987, ISBN 2-86531-028-0.
- Le Sénat romain a l'époque impériale. Recherches sur la composition de l'Assemblée et le statut de ses membres. Les Belles Lettres, Paris 1992.
- Histoire auguste. Les empereurs romains des 2. et 3. siècles. Laffont, Paris 1994.
- Aspects de l'antiquité tardive. Scripta varia II. L'Erma di Bretschneider, Roma 1994.
- La Gaule romaine et le droit Latin. Recherches sur l'histoire administrative et sur la romanisation des habitants. Scripta varia III. De Boccard, Lyon 1995.
- Le pouvoir impérial à Rome. Figures et commémorations. Scripta varia IV. published by Stéphane Benoist and Ségolène Demougin. Droz, Geneva 2008.

A bibliography for the years 1950 to 1986 can be found in André Chastagnol: L'Italie et l'Afrique au Bas-Empire. Études administratives et prosopographiques. Scripta varia. Presses universitaires, Lille 1987, ISBN 2-86531-028-0, (p. 11–21).

== Bibliography ==
- Gascou, Jacques (1996). "André Chastagnol (1920-1996)". Antiquités africaines. Vol. 32. pp. 7–8.
- Xavier Loriot, Daniel Nony, André Chastagnol (1920–1996), Revue numismatique, 152-6, 1997, (p. 5–8) Read online.
