= Gilles Clément =

French gardener, garden designer, botanist, entomologist and writer

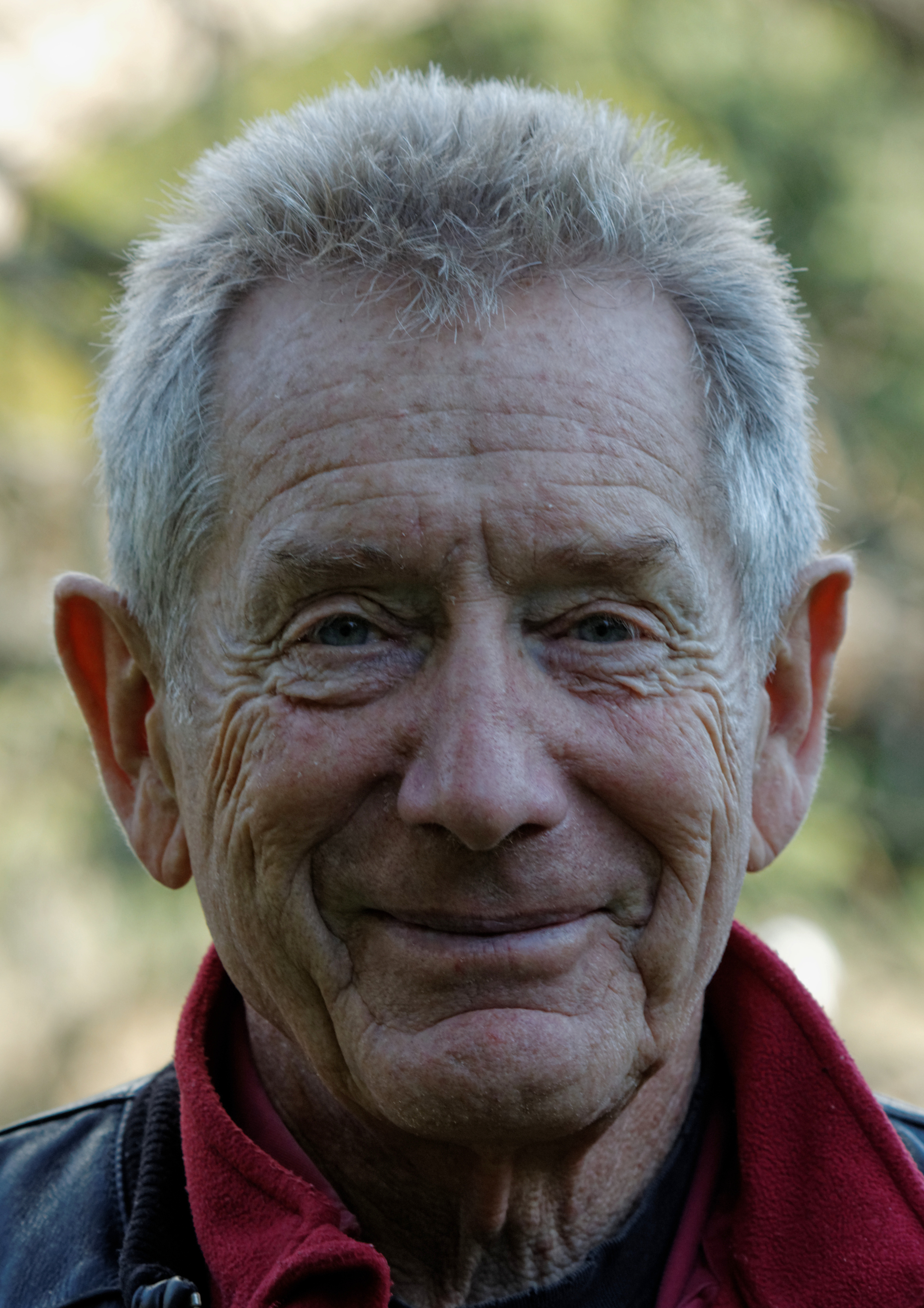
Gilles Clément (2015).

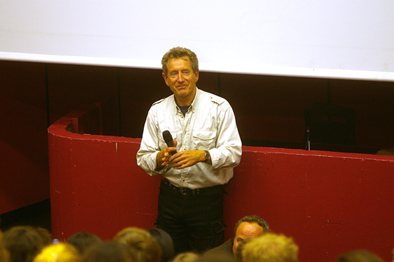
Gilles Clément at a conference at the National School of Architecture and Landscaping of Lille.

Gilles Clément (French pronunciation: [ʒil klemɑ̃]; born at Argenton-sur-Creuse, Indre, France in 1943), is a French gardener, garden designer, botanist, entomologist and writer.

== Biography ==
He is the author of several concepts in the framework of landscaping of the end of the twentieth century or the beginning of the twenty-first century, including in particular, 'moving garden' (jardin en mouvement), 'planetary garden' (jardin planétaire) and 'third landscape' (tiers paysage).

He has gained attention for his design of public parks in France, such as Parc André-Citroën. In 1998, he was the recipient of France's National Landscape Prize. Since 1977 he has developed his own "moving garden" (le jardin en mouvement) at La Vallée, Creuse.

Clément designed the exhibition Environment: Approaches for Tomorrow at the Canadian Centre for Architecture in 2006.

== Main achievements ==
- André-Citroën Park in Paris, with Allain Provost and Patrick Berger
- Jardins de l'Arche in Paris la Défense,
- Parc Henri Matisse in Euralille with Éric Berlin and Sylvain Flipo
- Valloires Garden in Argoules
- Garden of the Château de Blois
- Garden of the domaine du Rayol
- Garden of the Quai Branly museum in Paris, with Jean Nouvel
- Garden of the École normale supérieure de Lyon
- Garden of the Château de Châtenay-en-France
- Garden of the Château de Beauregard, Loire Valley
