= François Jacques =

French classical scholar

- Born: 5 February 1946; Bourges
- Died: 3 May 1992 (aged 46)
- Occupation: Historian

François Jacques (5 February 1946 – 3 May 1992) was a French historian and a specialist on Ancient Rome. His work focused on municipal life of the Roman Empire and profoundly contributed to a renewal of the historical perspectives on this issue.

== Career ==
After he obtained the agrégation of history, he taught at the University of Reims as lecturer and then he was appointed professor at the University of Nantes in 1981 and Lille in 1985.

His State doctoral thesis was defended in 1980 under the direction of André Chastagnol. François Jacques was also a student of Hans-Georg Pflaum. His analyzes on municipal life, especially the book based on his State doctorate, Le privilège de liberté (1984), helped establish the idea of the vitality of the municipal civilization under the Roman Empire. He did this by stressing maintaining the autonomy of the cities and by challenging a historiography which emphasized primarily the interference of the central government.

== Bibliography ==
=== Books ===
- 1983: Les curateurs des cités dans l'Occident romain de Trajan à Gallien, Paris, Nouvelles éditions latines, BnF 34915687f Read online.
- 1984: Le privilège de liberté. Politique impériale et autonomie municipale dans les cités de l'occident romain (161-244), Collection de l'École française de Rome, 916 pages, Read online.
- 1990: Les cités de l'occident romain, Paris
- 1990: in collaboration with John Scheid, Rome et l'intégration de l'empire. Volume I : Les structures de l'Empire romain

=== Articles online ===
- « Quelques problèmes d'histoire municipale à la lumière de la lex Irnitana », L'Afrique dans l'Occident romain (Ier siècle av. J.-C. - IVe siècle ap. J.-C.), Actes du colloque de Rome (3-5 December 1987): École Française de Rome, 1990. pp. 381–401. (Publications de l'École française de Rome, 134) Read online
- « Municipia libera de l'Afrique proconsulaire », Epigrafia. Actes du colloque international d'épigraphie latine en mémoire de Attilio Degrassi pour le centenaire de sa naissance, Actes de colloque de Rome (27-28 mai 1988): École Française de Rome, 1991. pp. 583–606. (Publications de l'École française de Rome, 143) Read online
- « Le schismatique, tyran furieux », Mélanges de l'École française de Rome (MEFRA), 94-2, 1982, pp. 921–949.
- with Bernard Bousquet, « Le raz de marée du 21 juillet 365. Du cataclysme local à la catastrophe cosmique », MEFRA, 96-1, 1984, p. 423-461.
- « Un exemple de concentration foncière en Bétique d'après le témoignage des timbres amphoriques d'une famille clarissime », MEFRA, 102-2, 1990, pp. 865–899.
- « Propriétés impériales et cités en Numidie Méridionale », Cahiers du centre Gustave Glotz, 1992, 3, pp. 123–139.

== Bibliography ==
- André Chastagnol, Ségolène Demougin, Claude Lepelley, Avant-propos, in André Chastagnol, Ségolène Demougin, Claude Lepelley éd., Splendidissima civitas. Études d'histoire romaine en hommage à François Jacques, Paris, 1996. pp. 3–6 (with bibliography by François Jacques at pp. 8–11).
