= Pierre Motin =

French poet and translator

Pierre Motin (c. 1566 – c. 1614) was a French poet and translator.
