= Timeline of Tours =

History of the Tours city of France

The following is a timeline of the history of the city of Tours, France.

== Prior to 18th century ==
- 1st C. – Construction of the Tours Amphitheatre. Population approx. 6,000.
- 2nd C. – Tours amphitheatre expanded
- 3rd C. – Roman Catholic diocese of Tours established.
- 250 – Tours Amphitheatre turned into a fortification
- 4th C. – Cathedral built by Litorius (bishop).
- 327 - Marmoutier Abbey founded.
- 360 – Castrum added to the area around the fortified amphitheatre.
- 371 – Martin of Tours becomes bishop.
- 5th C. – Caesarodunum renamed "Civitas Turonorum."
- 435 – Tours "affiliated to the Armorican confederation." Ecclesiastical province of Tours established.
- 461 – Religious Council of Tours held.
- 473 – Visigoths in power.
- 567 – Second Council of Tours held.
- 573 – Gregory of Tours becomes bishop.
- 732 – Battle of Tours fought nearby.
- 796
  - Marmoutier Abbey scriptorium active (approximate date).
  - Charlemagne put Marmoutier Abbey into the care of Alcuin of York.
- 813 – Third Council of Tours held.
- 10th C. – City walls of Châteauneuf built around basilica of St. Martin.
- 853 & 903 - Normans pilaged.
- 998 – Fire.
- 11th C. – Château de Tours built.
- 11th–12th C. – Church of St Martin built.
- 1034 – Pont d'Eudes (bridge) built (approximate date).
- 1055 – Council of Tours held.
- 1163 – Council of Tours (1163) held.
- 1170 – Tours Cathedral construction begins.
- 1203 – Livre tournois became the official currency of the kingdom.
- 1236 – Council of Tours (1236) held.
- 1308 – Estates General of Tours (1308) held.
- ca.1420 - Jean Fouquet, painter, was born in Tours.
- 1444 – Treaty of Tours. Tours became capital de facto of France.
- 1460 – Touraine customary laws codified.
- 1464 – Louis XI, the "universal spider", created the system of royal postal roads, first roads started from Tours.
- 1468 – Estates General of Tours (1468) held.
- 1484 – Estates General of Tours (1484) held.
- 1506 – Estates General of Tours (1506) held.
- 1542 – Généralité of Tours created (included Touraine, Maine and Anjou).
- 1547 - Tours Cathedral building completed.
- 1562 – Religious unrest.
- 1589 – Treaty of Plessis-les-Tours.
- 1594 – Parliament of Tours returned to Paris. Kings definitely returned to Paris area.

== 18th century ==
- 1761 – Académie des sciences, arts et belles-lettres de Touraine established.
- 1778 – Stone Bridge built.
- 1790 – Tours becomes part of the Indre-et-Loire souveraineté.
- 1798 – Church of St Martin demolished.
- 1799 – 20 May: Birth of Honoré de Balzac.

== 19th century ==
- 1800 – Population: 20,240.
- 1801 – Canton of Tours-Sud, -Centre, and -Nord created.
- 1803 – Chamber of Commerce established.
- 1840 – Société archéologique de Touraine founded.
- 1843 – Jardin botanique de Tours (garden) founded.
- 1846 - Tours station opened.
- 1855 - Tours Amphitheatre rediscovered.
- 1858 – Tours–Le Mans railway begins operating.
- 1861 – Population: 41,061.
- 1867 – Union Libérale newspaper begins publication.
- 1870 – Tours becomes temporary "seat of French government, during siege of Paris."
- 1872 – Tours Municipal Theatre built.
- 1877 – Tours tramway (1877) begins operating.
- 1886 – Population: 59,585.
- 1889 – Tours Municipal Theatre reopened after fire.
- 1898 – Gare de Tours (rail station) built.

== 20th century ==
- 1904 – Hôtel de Ville completed.
- 1906 – Population: 67,601.
- 1911 – Population: 73,398.
- 1917 – American Expeditionary Forces' "chief supply base" set up at Tours (approximate date), during World War I.
- 1924 – Basilica of St. Martin, Tours rebuilt.
- 1949 – Tours trolleybus begins operating.
- 1957 – Bibliothèque municipale de Tours (library) built.
- 1962 – Population: 92,944.
- 1968 – Musée du Compagnonnage established.
- 1969 – François Rabelais University founded.
- 1978
  - April: Collapse of Wilson Bridge (Tours).^{(fr)}
  - Stade de la Vallée du Cher (stadium) opens.
  - Musée des Equipages Militaires et du Train (museum) established.
- 1982 – Tours becomes part of the Centre-Val de Loire region.
- 1999 – Population: 132,820.

== 21st century ==
- 2011 – Population: 134,633.
- 2013 – Tours tramway begins operating.
- 2014
  - March: Tours municipal election, 2014 held.
  - Serge Babary becomes mayor.

== See also ==
- Tours history
- Caesarodunum (Roman-era settlement)
- List of mayors of Tours
- List of heritage sites in Tours
- History of Centre-Val de Loire region

Other cities in the Centre-Val de Loire region:

- Timeline of Bourges
- Timeline of Orléans

== Bibliography ==
=== in English ===
- "Tours", Handbook for Travellers in France, London: John Murray, 1861
- "Tours", Northern France, Leipsic: Karl Baedeker, 1899, OCLC 2229516
- "Tours". Chambers's Encyclopaedia. London. 1901. hdl:2027/uc2.ark:/13960/t56d64f6t.
- "Tours" . Encyclopædia Britannica. Vol. 27 (11th ed.). 1910. pp. 107–108.
- Barral i Altet, Xavier (2001). The Romanesque: Towns, Cathedrals and Monasteries. Cologne: Taschen. p. 67. ISBN 3-8228-1237-4.
- Black, CB (1876), "Tours", Guide to the North of France, Edinburgh: Adam and Charles Black
- Caswell, Jean; Sipkov, Ivan (1977). "Touraine". Coutumes of France in the Library of Congress: an Annotated Bibliography. USA: Library of Congress. hdl:2027/mdp.39015034753866. ISBN 978-0-8444-0232-1.
- Hourihane, Colum, ed. (2012). "Tours". Grove Encyclopedia of Medieval Art and Architecture. Oxford University Press. ISBN 978-0-19-539536-5.
- Vincent, Benjamin (1910), "Tours", Haydn's Dictionary of Dates (25th ed.), London: Ward, Lock & Co., hdl:2027/uc2.ark:/13960/t41r6xh8t

=== in French ===
- Jean-Baptiste-Joseph Champagnac [in French] (1839). "Tours". Manuel des dates, en forme de dictionnaire. Perisse frères.
- Alexandre Giraudet (1844). Tours; ses monuments, son industrie, ses grands hommes. Guide de l'étranger dans cette ville (in French). O. Lecesne.
- "Tours". Basse-Loire. À la France: sites et monuments (in French). Paris: Touring-Club de France. 1901. OCLC 457600236.
- Tours. Guides Joanne (in French). 1905.
- Paul Vitry (1907). Tours et les châteaux de Touraine. Les villes d'art célèbres (in French). Librairie Renouard.
