= Timeline of Bourges =

The following is a timeline of the history of the city of Bourges, France.

== Prior to 20th century ==
- ca.250 CE – Roman Catholic diocese of Bourges established.
- 475 CE – Visigoths in power (until ca.507).
- 762 – Siege and conquest by the Franks under King Pepin the Short.
- 1195 – Bourges Cathedral construction begins (approximate date).
- 1225 – Religious Council of Bourges held.
- 1312 – Coutume de Berry (law) written (approximate date).
- 1380 – Public clock installed (approximate date).
- 1412 - Siege of Bourges (1412) during the Armagnac–Burgundian Civil War.
- 1424 - Bourges astronomical clock installed in the cathedral.
- 1438 – Religious council held, resulting in the Pragmatic Sanction of Bourges issued by Charles VII of France.
- 1453 - Palais Jacques Coeur completed.
- 1463 – University of Bourges founded by Louis XI.
- 1487 – Bourges fire of 1487.
- 1492 – Hôtel des Échevins (town hall) built.
- 1510 – Hôtel Lallemant built.
- 1528 – Religious council held.
- 1573 – Collège des jésuites de Bourges founded.
- 1584 – Religious council held.
- 1645 – Hôtel de Bourbon built.
- 1790 – Bourges becomes part of the Cher souveraineté.
- 1793 – Population: 15,964.
- 1796 – Archives départementales du Cher established.
- 1831 – Canal de Berry constructed.
- 1834 – Musée du Berry (museum) founded.
- 1866 – Société des antiquaires du Centre founded.
- 1875 – Société de géographie de Bourges formed.
- 1886 – Population: 42,829.
- 1893 – Dépêche du Berry newspaper begins publication.
- 1898 – Tramway de Bourges begins operating.

== 20th century ==
- 1911 – Population: 45,735.
- 1927 – Muséum d'histoire naturelle de Bourges opens.
- 1928 – Bourges Airport opens.
- 1940 – The 5th Fighter Group was formed.
- 1944 – 36 Jews are taken from Bourges by the Milice in a rafle under the command of Joseph Lécussan and buried alive in the countryside.
- 1961 – Comédie de Bourges (theatre group) formed.
- 1963 – Maison de la culture de Bourges opens.
- 1964 – Société d'archéologie et d'histoire du Berry founded.
- 1966 – Bourges 18 football club formed.
- 1975 – Population: 77,300.
- 1977 – Printemps de Bourges music festival begins.
- 1986 – Conservatoire national du Pélargonium (garden) established.
- 1989 – Transports en commun de Bourges (transit entity) established.
- 1991 – Stade des Grosses Plantes (stadium) opens.
- 1992 – Hôtel de Ville (city hall) opens.
- 1995 – Serge Lepeltier becomes mayor.

== 21st century ==
- 2006 – Auditorium de Bourges opens.
- 2014 – Pascal Blanc becomes mayor.

== See also ==
- Bourges history (fr)
- List of mayors of Bourges
- List of bishops of Bourges
- List of heritage sites in Bourges

Other cities in the Centre-Val de Loire region:

- Timeline of Orléans
- Timeline of Tours

== Bibliography ==
- Eugène-Oscar Lami (1881). "Bourges". Dictionnaire encyclopédique et biographique de l'industrie et des arts industriels (in French). Vol. 1. Paris. OCLC 26948816.
- Alphonse Buhot de Kersers [in French] (1883). Histoire et statistique monumentale du Cher (in French). Pigelet & Tardy.
- Edmond Charlemagne (1889). Les anciennes institutions municipales de Bourges (in French). Tardy-Pigelet.
- "Bourges". Chambers's Encyclopaedia. London. 1901. hdl:2027/hvd.hn52jk.
- "Bourges", Northern France (4th ed.), Leipzig: Karl Baedeker, 1905, hdl:2027/mdp.39015031863452, OCLC 01820283
- "Bourges" . Encyclopædia Britannica. Vol. 4 (11th ed.). 1910. pp. 330–331.
- Caswell, Jean; Sipkov, Ivan (1977). "Berry". Coutumes of France in the Library of Congress: an Annotated Bibliography. USA: Library of Congress. hdl:2027/mdp.39015034753866. ISBN 978-0-8444-0232-1. (+ Bourges)
- Colum Hourihane, ed. (2012). "Bourges". Grove Encyclopedia of Medieval Art and Architecture. Oxford University Press. ISBN 978-0-19-539536-5.
- Jean-Pierre Thiollet (2017). "B comme Bourges". Improvisation so piano (in French). Neva Editions. ISBN 978-2-35055-228-6.
