= Timeline of Orléans =

The following is a timeline of the history of the city of Orléans, France.

== Prior to 20th century ==
- 2nd century – Roman Catholic Diocese of Orléans established.
- 463 – Battle of Orleans (463).
- 511 – First Council of Orléans held.
- 548 – Fifth Council of Orléans held.
- 1278 – Orléans Cathedral construction begins.
- 1429 – Siege of Orléans.
- 1439 – Estates-General of 1439 held.
- 1490 – Printing press in operation.
- 1508 – Hôtel des Créneaux built.
- 1549 – Hôtel Groslot d'Orléans built.
- 1560 – Estates-General of 1560 held.
- 1714 – Bibliothèque communale d'Orléans (library) founded.
- 1763 – George V Bridge, Orléans opens.
- 1790 – Orléans becomes part of the Loiret souveraineté.
- 1797 – Musée des Beaux-Arts d'Orléans established.
- 1800 – Population: 41,937.
- 1809 – Société des Sciences Physiques et Médicales d'Orléans active.
- 1843 – Gare d'Orléans opens.
- 1870 – December: Battle of Orléans.
- 1872 – Chartres-Orléans line begins operating.
- 1873 – Orléans-Gien line begins operating.
- 1877 – Tramway begins operating.
- 1886 – Population: 60,826.

== 20th century ==
- 1905 – Maréchal-Joffre Bridge (1905) built.
- 1911 – Population: 72,096.
- 1958 – Maréchal-Joffre Bridge (1958) built.
- 1966 – University of Orléans active.
- 1975
  - Orléans Theatre opens.
  - Population: 106,246.
- 1977 – Halles Châtelet opens.
- 1981 – Hôtel de Ville completed.
- 1982 – Orleans becomes part of the Centre-Val de Loire region.
- 1988 – Place d'Arc opens.
- 1989 – March: 1989 French municipal elections held.
- 1996 – Zénith d'Orléans arena opens.
- 2000 – Orléans tramway begins operating.

== 21st century ==
- 2005 – Open d'Orléans tennis tournament begins.
- 2008 – Gare d'Orléans rebuilt.
- 2012 – Population: 114,286.
- 2014 – March: Orléans municipal election, 2014 held.
- 2015 – Olivier Carré becomes mayor.

== See also ==
- Orléans#History
  - Histoire d'Orléans, standalone article at fr.wiki
- List of mayors of Orléans
- Duke of Orléans, including a list of the dukes
- List of heritage sites in Orléans
- History of Loiret

Other cities in the Centre-Val de Loire region:

- Timeline of Bourges
- Timeline of Tours

== Bibliography ==
=== in English ===
- Clement Cruttwell (1793). "Orleans". Gazetteer of France. London: G.G.J. and J. Robinson. hdl:2027/njp.32101072026816.
- Abraham Rees (1819), "Orleans", The Cyclopaedia, London: Longman, Hurst, Rees, Orme & Brown, hdl:2027/njp.32101065312926
- "Orleans", Handbook for travellers in France, London: John Murray, 1861
- C.B. Black (1876), "Orleans", Guide to the north of France, Edinburgh: Adam and Charles Black
- "Orleans", Northern France, Leipsic: Karl Baedeker, 1899, OCLC 2229516
- "Orleans" . Encyclopædia Britannica. Vol. 20 (11th ed.). 1910. pp. 286–292.
- Benjamin Vincent (1910), "Orleans", Haydn's Dictionary of Dates (25th ed.), London: Ward, Lock & Co., hdl:2027/loc.ark:/13960/t89g6g776

=== in French ===
- Jean-Baptiste-Joseph Champagnac [in French] (1839). "Orleans". Manuel des dates, en forme de dictionnaire (in French). Perisse frères.
- Eusèbe Girault de Saint-Fargeau [in French] (1850). "Orleans". Guide pittoresque: portatif et complet, du voyageur en France (in French) (3rd ed.). Paris: Firmin Didot frères. p. 168. hdl:2027/uiug.30112081968700.
- Charles Cuissard (1894). La Bibliothèque d'Orléans: son origine, sa formation, son développement (in French). Herluison.
