= Wilson Bridge (Tours) =

Historic stone bridge in Tours, France, spanning the Loire River

Pont Wilson
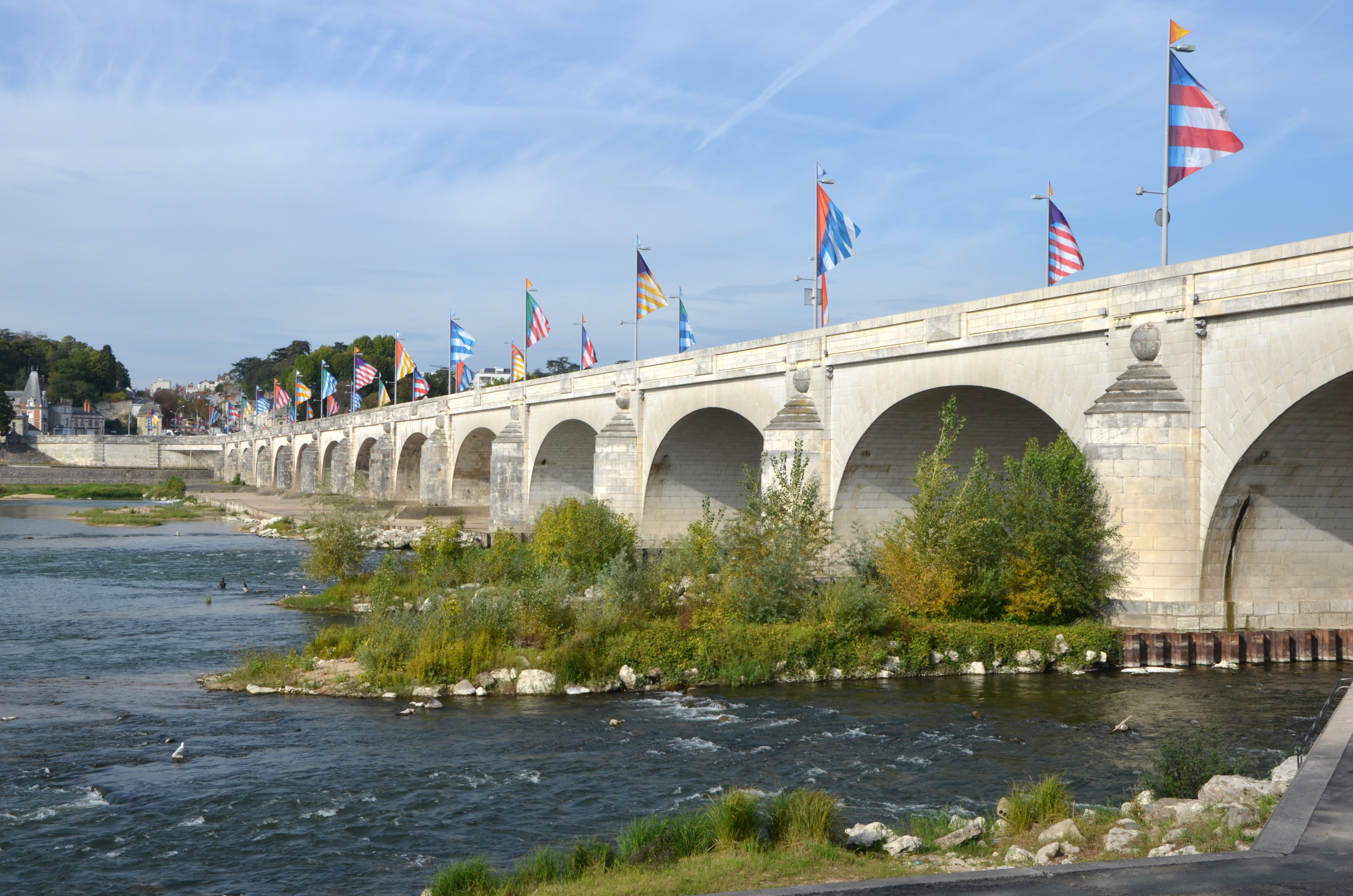
- The bridge in 2011
- Coordinates: 47.399221°N 0.685579°E
- Crosses: Loire
- Locale: Tours

Characteristics
- Total length: 434
- Width: 21

History
- Construction start: 1765
- Construction end: 1778

Location
- Interactive map of Pont Wilson

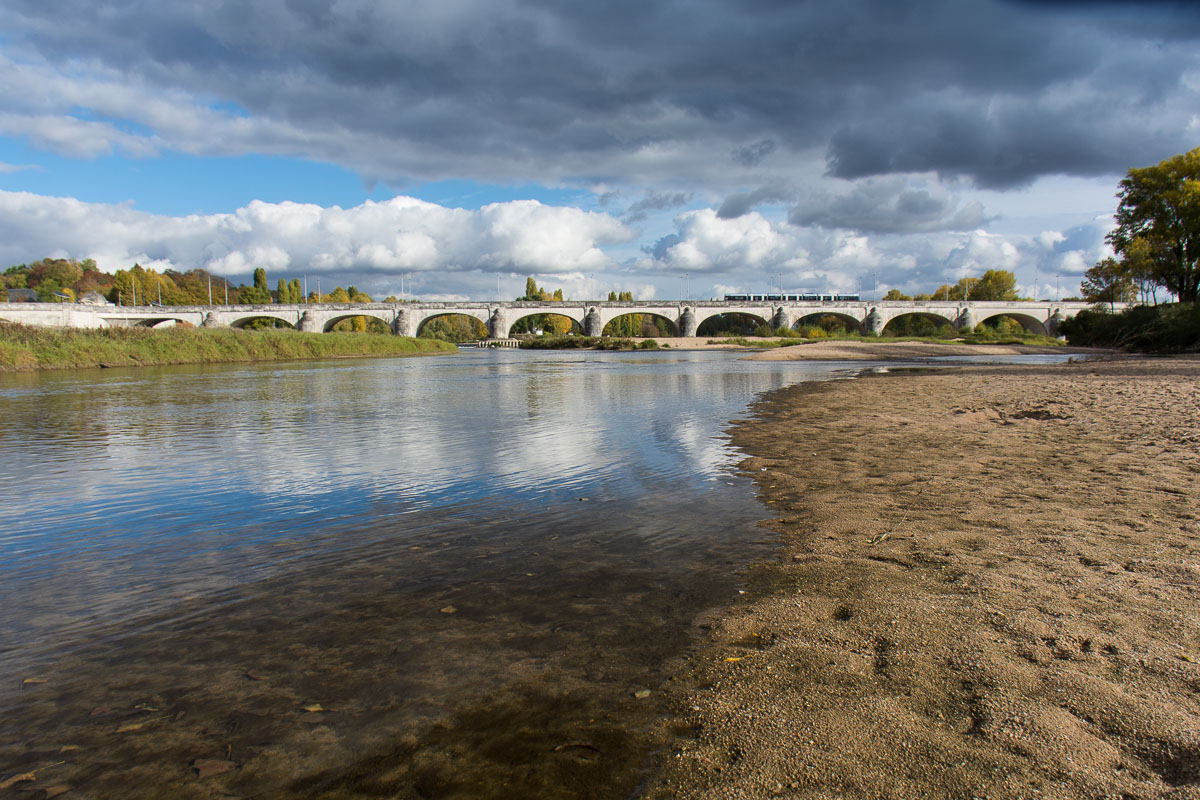
Wilson Bridge in Tours, viewed from the Loire.

The Wilson Bridge, built between 1765 and 1778, is the oldest bridge in Tours. It features 15 arches and extends 434 meters (1,424 feet) across the Loire. Officially named the Wilson Bridge, it is commonly referred to by locals as the Pont de Pierre (Stone Bridge). It connects the south end of the Place Choiseul at the foot of the Avenue de la Tranchée to the north end of Place Anatole-France in front of Rue Nationale.

The bridge is listed as a historic monument. It replaced the deteriorating Pont d'Eudes from the 11th century located further east, (Note: This bridge was situated 500 metres (1,600 ft) eastward, near the château de Tours, roughly where the Saint-Symphorien footbridge now stands.) allowing its decommissioning and eventual replacement by the Passerelle Saint-Symphorien.

== Location and access ==
The Wilson Bridge spans the Loire in Tours. It links the northern avenue de la Tranchée via place Choiseul with Rue Nationale via Place Anatole-France to the south. It forms an integral part of the north-south axis that traverses Tours, starting at the top of the avenue de la Tranchée and ending at the base of the pont de l'Alouette. This axis intersects Place Jean-Jaurès, Avenue de Grammont, and crosses the Cher via the pont du Sanitas.

Once a vital segment of the Route nationale 10 (declassified in 2005), its traffic diminished with the introduction of the tramway in 2013 and was fully closed to vehicles in the summer of 2020, becoming exclusive to pedestrians and cyclists.

The southern quay serves as a lively center for social activities, tourism, and recreation. The guinguette de Tours, located at the bridge’s base, hosts festive events from May to October.

== Dimensions ==
The Wilson Bridge measures 434 metres (1,424 ft) in length and 21.30 m in width, including the upstream and downstream starlings. It comprises fifteen arches, each 24.30 metres (79.7 ft) long with a rise of 8.12 metres (26.6 ft). Supported by fourteen piers, the bridge faced criticism during construction from the engineer Jean-Rodolphe Perronet, who noted that the overly wide piers caused excessive water turbulence.

== Origin of the name ==
The bridge is named after Woodrow Wilson (1856–1924), the 28th President of the United States, recognized for his role as a French ally during World War I. It was officially renamed in his honor in 1918.

In late 1917, American troops arrived in Tours, establishing a major military airbase in Tours-Nord by autumn 1918, one of the largest in France at the time. The American presence ended in autumn 1919. According to Jean-Luc Porhel, (Note: Jean-Luc Porhel is the director of the Indre-et-Loire departmental archives.) General John Pershing, commander of the American Expeditionary Forces, wrote in his memoirs that "the United States had two capitals: the political capital, Washington, and the economic and material capital, Tours". Pershing selected Tours for its extensive railway infrastructure, particularly the Paris-Orléans railway workshops, which he had noted during a prior family visit. In 1917, he identified the city’s rail network as optimal for rapid troop and supply transport to the front.

== History ==
=== Construction ===
By the 17th century, the 600-year-old Pont d'Eudes exhibited significant structural weaknesses due to poor design and repeated repairs following numerous incidents. It required falsework for King Louis XIII’s visit to Tours in 1626, underscoring the need for a replacement.

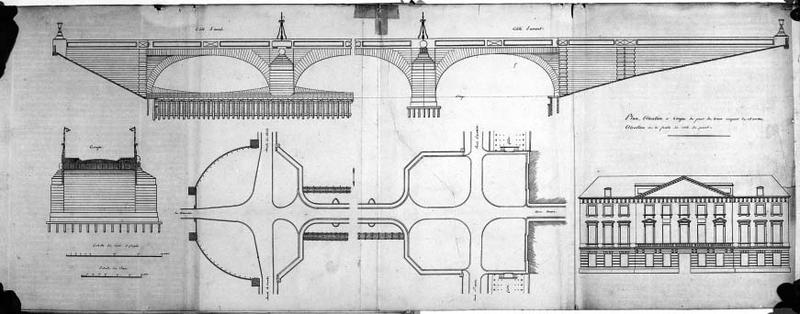
Old Tours, rue royale, pont royale, archives collection palustre, year 1810, C.N.M.H.

In the 18th century, major urban developments shaped Tours’ north-south meridian. By 1750, the bridge over the Cher and the embankment later known as Avenue de Grammont were completed. In 1758, Mathieu Bayeux, inspector general of the Ponts et Chaussées, designed a bridge project approved by the mayor and aldermen. Construction began with the laying of the cornerstone at the northern abutment in 1758. The project eliminated the Île Saint-Jacques on the Loire, elevating the southern bank and displacing approximately 900 families of washerwomen and fishermen. This earthwork altered the elevation of the Saint-Julien Church porch relative to rues Colbert and Nationale. The bridge, constructed with rubble stone from La Membrolle-sur-Choisille and dressed stone from Bléré and Athée-sur-Cher, was completed in 1778 under Jean-Baptiste de Voglie, following Bayeux’s retirement and death in 1777. Initially, it was named "Pont Royal".

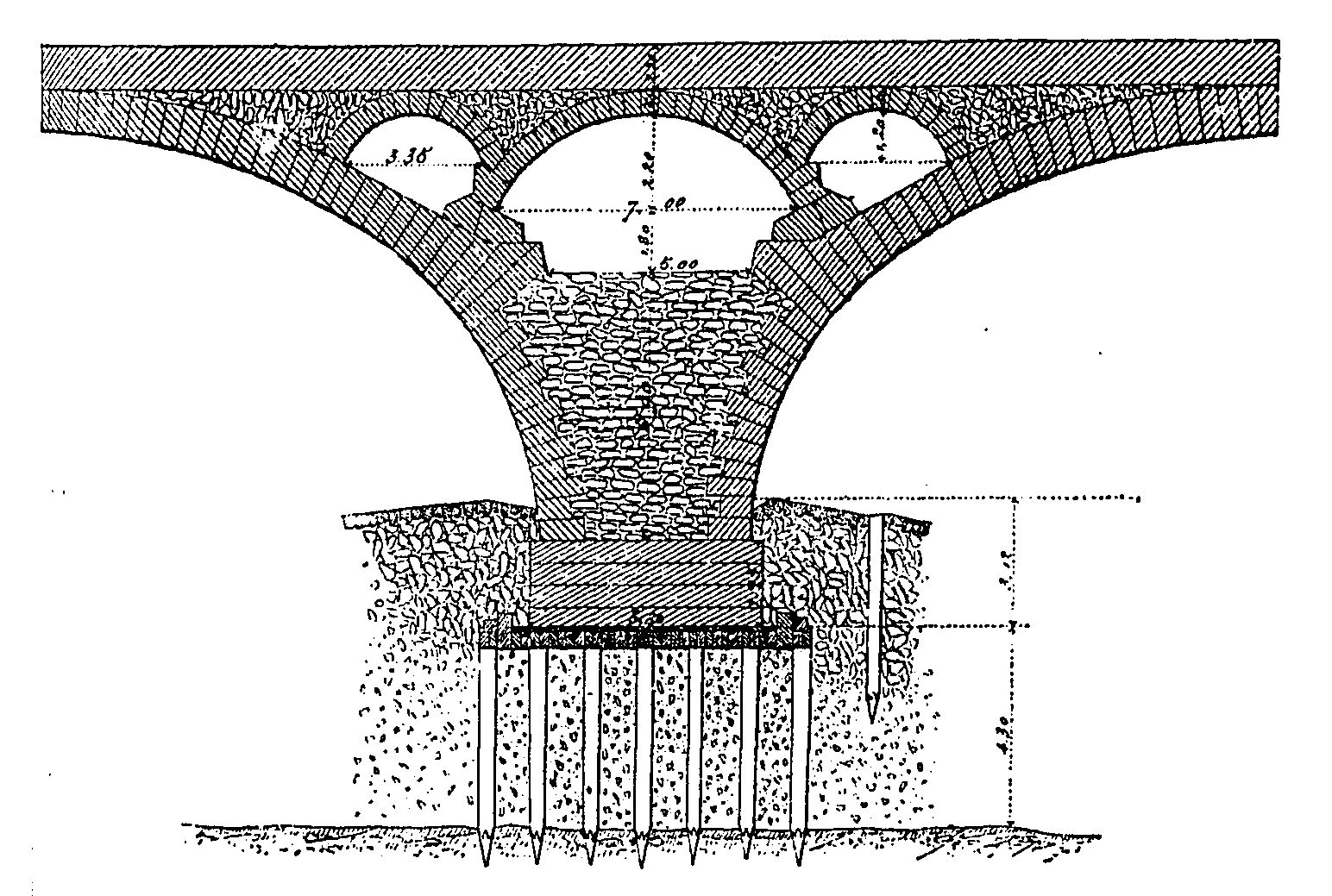
Cross-section of a pier showing the élégissements (Ernest Degrand, Ponts en maçonnerie, tome II - 1888).

=== The octroi ===
The Wilson Bridge served as the northern gateway to Tours across the Loire. In the 18th century, the four octroi pavilions at Place Choiseul controlled city access and levied the octroi tax on entrants.

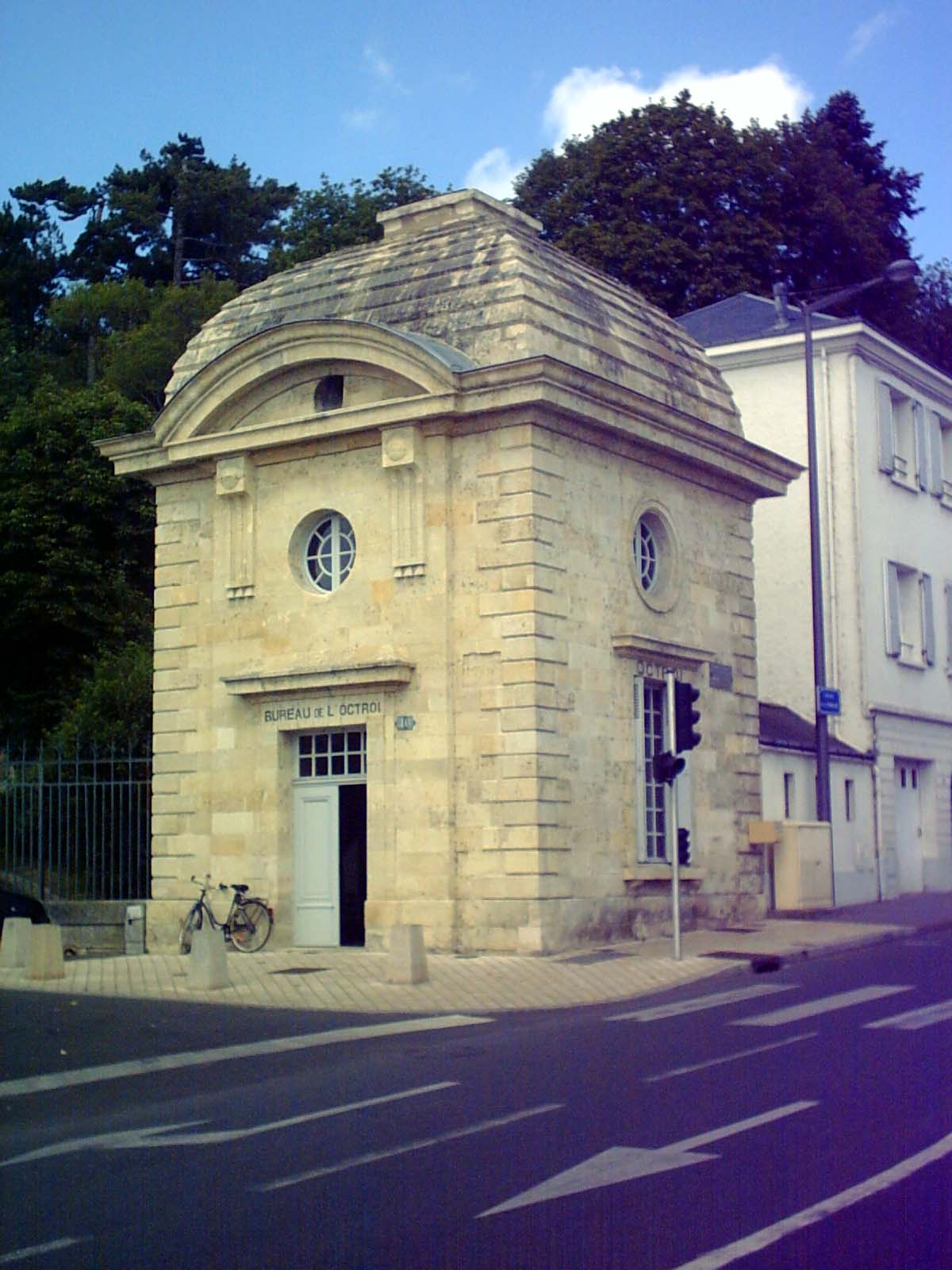
A surviving octroi pavilion at place Choiseul, north of the bridge.

=== The old tramway ===
The Ancient Tours tramway, launched in 1877, crossed the Wilson Bridge, connecting Tours to Vouvray. Initially horse-drawn, it evolved through steam, compressed air, and electric (1905) phases.

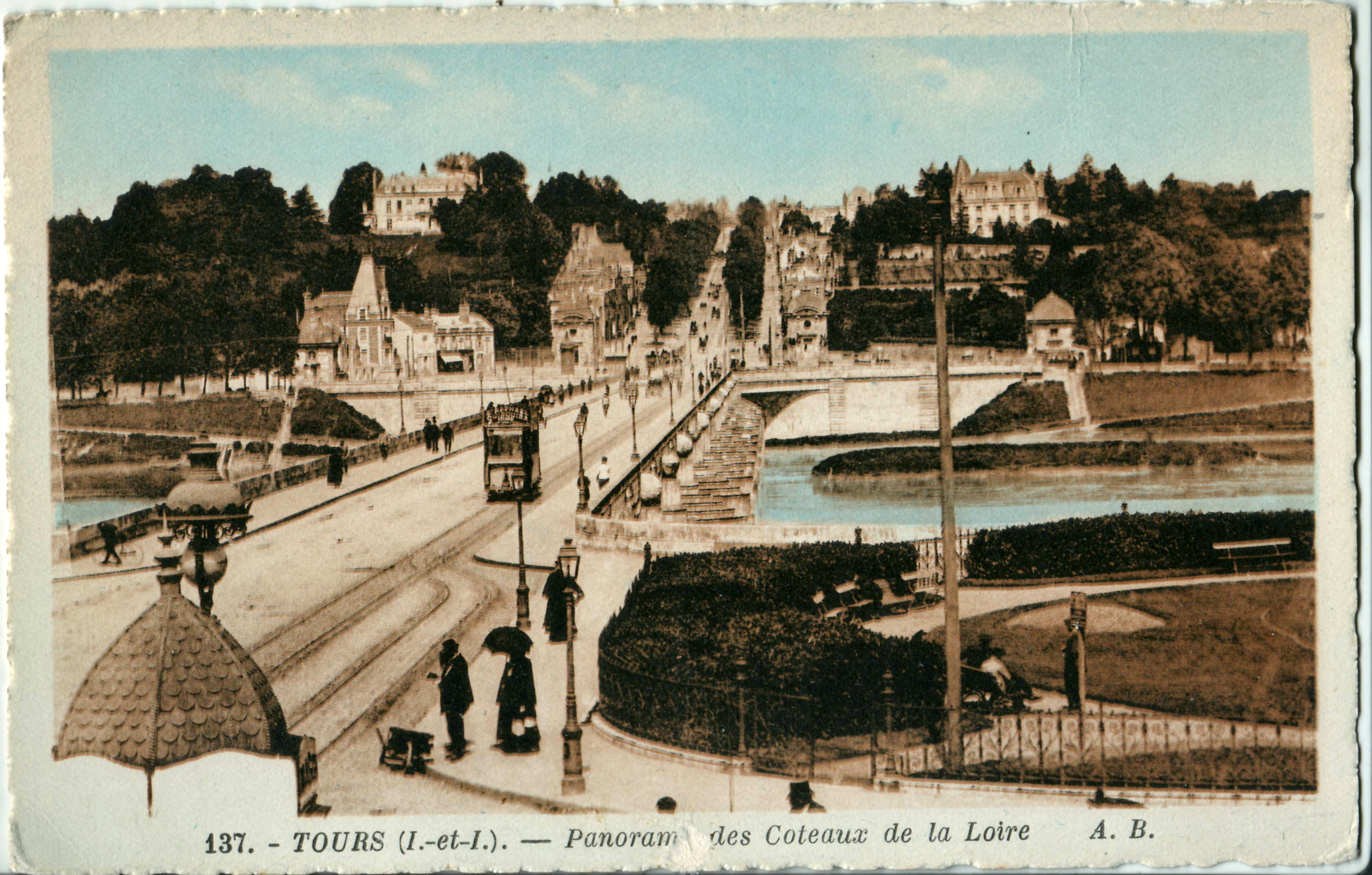
The bridge accommodated the old Tours tramway in the 1900s.

After World War II, the bridge and its tram lines sustained damage. The tram ceased operations in September, and the tracks were removed.

=== The World Wars ===
Renamed “Wilson” in 1918 after Woodrow Wilson, U.S. President from 1913 to 1921, the bridge commemorated America’s role in World War I, during which Tours hosted a major U.S. base.

It was classified as a historic monument in 1926.

On June 18, 1940, the retreating French Army demolished an arch on the southern side, disrupting water mains. The following day, a fire sparked by German artillery in central Tours caused extensive damage. On June 22, the retreating Wehrmacht destroyed three northern arches. Temporary spans were installed until full reconstruction was completed.

=== Present day ===
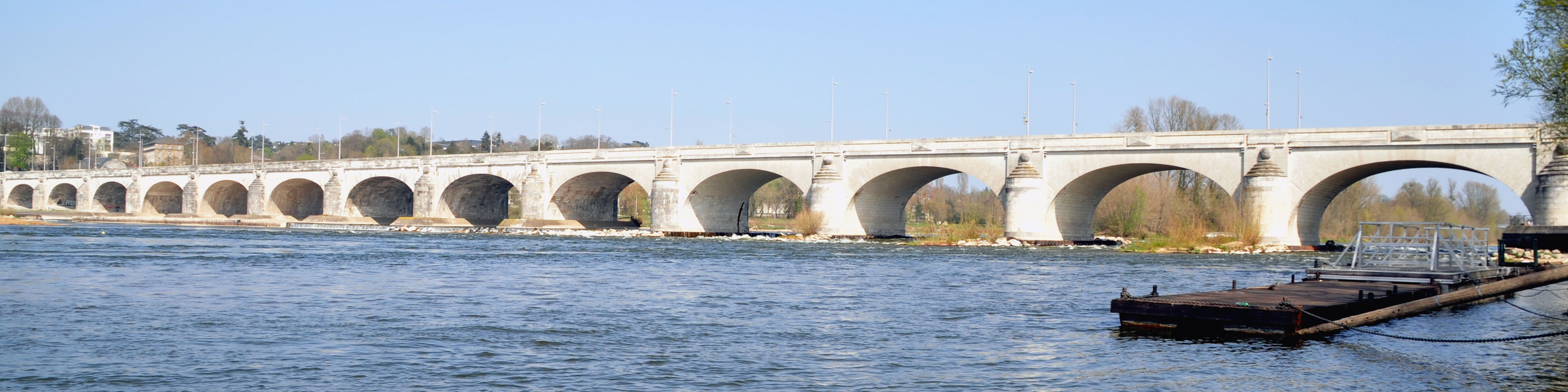
Thirteen of the fifteen arches of Wilson Bridge in 2012, viewed from the southern Loire quay.

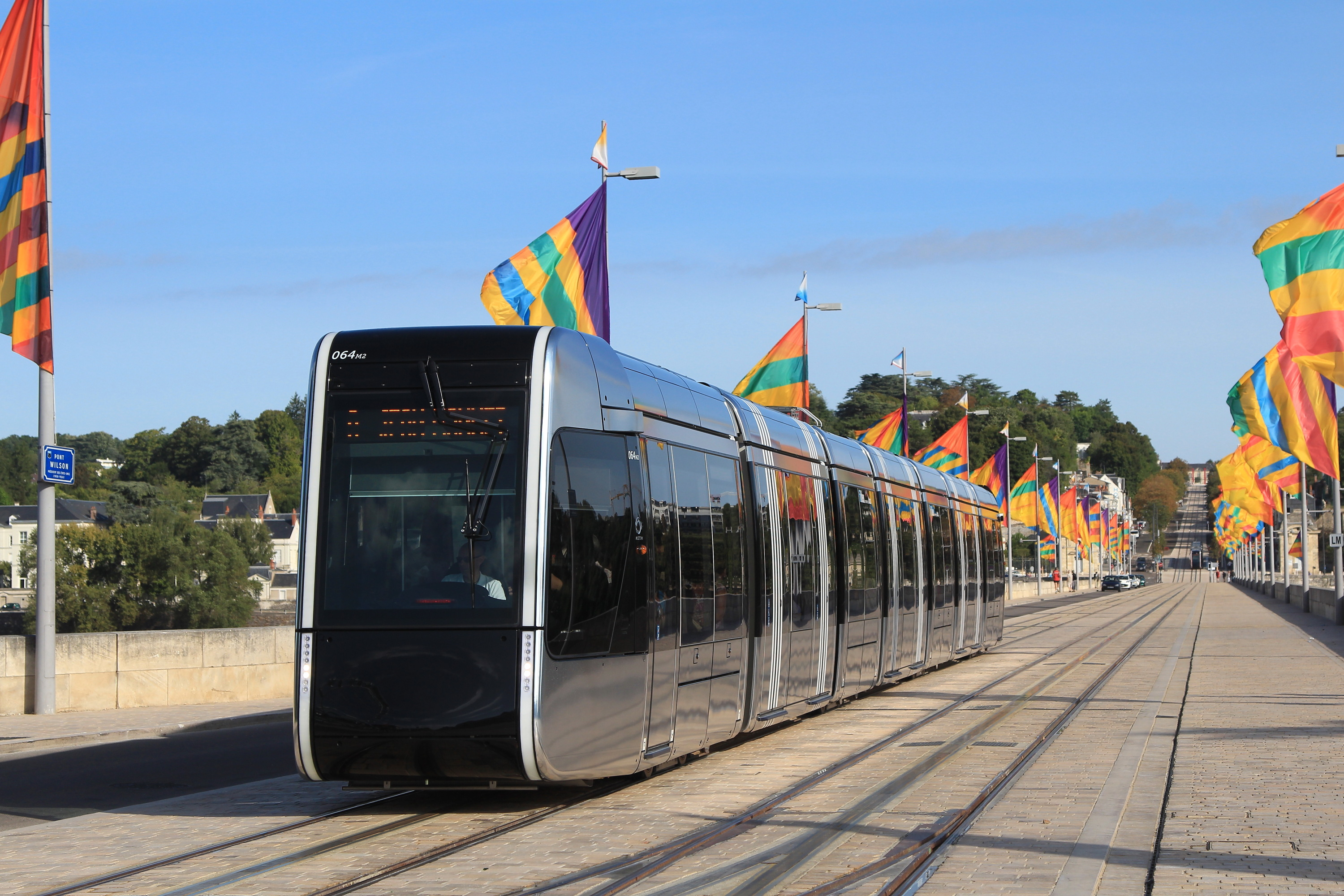
Citadis No. 64 on Pont Wilson, September.

Two of the bridge’s four lanes were designated for bus use in a dedicated corridor.

The first tramway line, opened on August 31, 2013, utilizes the bridge. From that date, car traffic was limited to north-south travel, with south-north lanes repurposed for mixed pedestrian and cyclist use. On July 13, 2020, under new EELV mayor Emmanuel Denis, who aimed to extend a cycle path to gare de Tours, the bridge closed to cars entirely. Vehicles now use the Pont Napoléon or Pont Mirabeau to reach the city center from the north. The bridge now serves pedestrians (eastern side), cyclists (western side, formerly north-south traffic), and the tramway. In summer 2023, urban furniture was installed in the pedestrian zone.

The bridge site, encompassing 66 hectares (160 acres) from Passerelle Saint-Symphorien upstream to Pont Napoléon downstream, is protected under a decree of May 15, 1996.

== Incidents ==
Various accidents plagued the bridge from its 18th century construction into the early 19th century. In 1789, four northern arches collapsed, necessitating ferry use after the Pont d'Eudes demolition began in 1784.

Reconstruction of these arches lasted until 1810, with a sill plate connecting the piers for stability. Periodic repairs continued until 1840. This prompted Godeau d'Entraigues, mayor of Indre-et-Loire in the 1830s, to humorously remark to the Interior Minister after another repair: "Sir, I think it will go far. It might even reach Nantes!" After 1840, the bridge remained incident-free for a century.

Original sections 28 August 1777 28 August 1777 and 22 June 1944 25 January 1789 18 June 1940 and 3 May 1978 22 June 1944 9 April 1978 10 April 1978 3 May 1978

=== The 1978 collapse ===
On April 9 and 10, 1978, four southern arches collapsed, followed by the southern abutment on May 3. Approximately one-third of the bridge—five piers and six arches—was destroyed.

On April 9 at 9:27 PM, a single vehicle, a Peugeot 404, (Note: Traffic was light that morning, a Sunday during the spring break (1 to 17) in the Orléans-Tours academy.) was on the bridge when it began to collapse. The driver accelerated, safely reaching the bank as an arch sank into the flooded Loire. By that afternoon, three arches fully collapsed under the gaze of photographers and cameramen. Two more followed the next day, and the first arch and southern abutment fell on 3. Over 30% of the stone bridge was destroyed.

A major pipeline rupture in the deck left 110,000 Tours residents without running water. Tanker trucks were deployed to serve residents. On the closed passerelle Saint-Symphorien, a temporary water line was installed across the Loire around the clock despite freezing conditions. Connections tapped into suburban networks.

Telephone and electricity services were cut: provisional setups on the passerelle Saint-Symphorien and a radio relay on Rue Nationale were established. Northern France phone service resumed within hours, but northern Indre-et-Loire took eight days to normalize.

The collapse disrupted traffic, as the Route nationale 10 crossed the bridge at the time. Traffic diverted to the overburdened Pont Napoléon and Pont Mirabeau, or the A10 motorway bridge, where tolls were waived at the request of Tours mayor Jean Royer. Two 1,300 tonnes (1,400 short tons) Bailey bridges from army reserves were erected in July and March, one reserved for public transport and emergencies, though traffic remained limited.

The collapse prompted inspections of other Loire bridges, including Saumur, Blois, Amboise, Muides-sur-Loire, and Beaugency, where significant foundation work followed a September 1978 inspection. Some bridges faced closures or partial restrictions.

On July 16, 1978, a distracted driver from Orléans entered the bridge, bypassed Bailey bridge construction, and crashed onto rubble, escaping with minor injuries.

In 1980, the AMAT (Touraine musicians and artists association) released a 45 RPM record about the event: Side A, La Complainte du pont de pierre by Cristal (vocals Bernard Campan, guitars Jean-François Buron and Marc Rubert), Side B, Vieux pont d’amour by Elyane Mathiaud (accordion Gilles Lambert, guitar Éric Lange-Berteaux, piano Jean-Marie Ribis), musical direction Pierre Uga, Barrière 111.111.

==== Causes of the collapse ====
The 1978 collapse resulted from multiple factors. The DDE director, Moscow, attributed it to underwater scouring in the sandy riverbed and the southward shift of the Loire’s main channel. Subsequent studies identified state-authorized gravel extractions, which deepened the riverbed by nearly 3 meters, causing regressive erosion that destabilized the bridge’s foundations and radiers.

The wooden radiers deteriorated when exposed during the 1976 drought, as wood preserves best when submerged. Cost-saving measures during construction also compromised the radiers and foundations.

The removal of Île Saint-Jacques during construction may have contributed to instability.

==== Reconstruction ====
Two weeks after the collapse, Mayor Jean Royer announced a referendum on reconstruction. Four options were presented to residents from November 25 to December 26, 1978, receiving 6,322 votes.

The four reconstruction proposals
Proposal	Estimated cost (1978 francs)	Estimated duration	Votes in November–December 1978 referendum
1) Full reconstruction “as original” (stone cladding, concrete core)	60 million	24 months	881
2) Reinforce intact northern section, rebuild collapsed portion “as original” (per Proposal 1)	35 million	18 months	3,324
3) Concrete bridge	48 million	24 months	1,873
4) Metal bridge	48 million	24 months	244

The “reinforce and rebuild” option, the most cost-effective, was selected. The state, responsible for this national route bridge, and an ad hoc commission endorsed the choice, prioritizing cost and speed.

Debris clearance occurred from August to November 1978. The ten remaining arches were reinforced from October to December 1978. The collapsed arches were rebuilt from August 1979 to July 1981. Utilities and paving were restored from June to September 1981, followed by a facelift from July to September 1982.

The reconstructed bridge reopened on September 18, 1982, at a cost of 81 million francs, fully funded by the state.

Post-collapse inspections prompted foundation reinforcements at the Pont de Beaugency.

== See also ==
- Tramway de Tours

== Bibliography ==
- Boyer, Marjorie Nice (1976). Medieval French bridges: a history. The Medieval Academy of America. Publication. American Council of Learned Societies. Cambridge, Mass: Medieval Academy of America. ISBN 978-0-910956-58-1.
- Chevalier, Bernard (1985). Histoire de Tours. Univers de la France et des pays francophones. Toulouse: Privat. ISBN 978-2-7089-8224-6.
- Forest, Jean-Louis; de Sarran, Patrice; Favre, Pierre; Maillard, Pierre; Leveel, Pierre (1979). Le Pont de Tours, Deux siècles d'histoire. éditions CLD and La Nouvelle République.
- Grattesat, Guy (June 1980). "L'effondrement partiel du pont Wilson à Tours. Ses causes et ses enseignements". Travaux (544).
- Grattesat, Guy (1983). Ponts de France. FeniXX réédition numérique (Presses de l'École nationale des ponts et chaussées). ISBN 978-2402414753.
- Montens, Serge (2001). Les plus beaux ponts de France. Paris: Bonneton. ISBN 978-2-86253-275-2.
- Pérouse de Montclos, Jean-Marie, ed. (1995). Centre, Val de Loire. Le guide du patrimoine. Paris: Hachette. ISBN 978-2-01-018538-0.
- Robert, Jean (1974). Histoire des transports dans les villes de France. Paris: Presses Universitaires de France.
