= Palace of the Countess of Lebrija =

Spanish house museum

Coordinates: 37°23′32″N 5°59′37″W

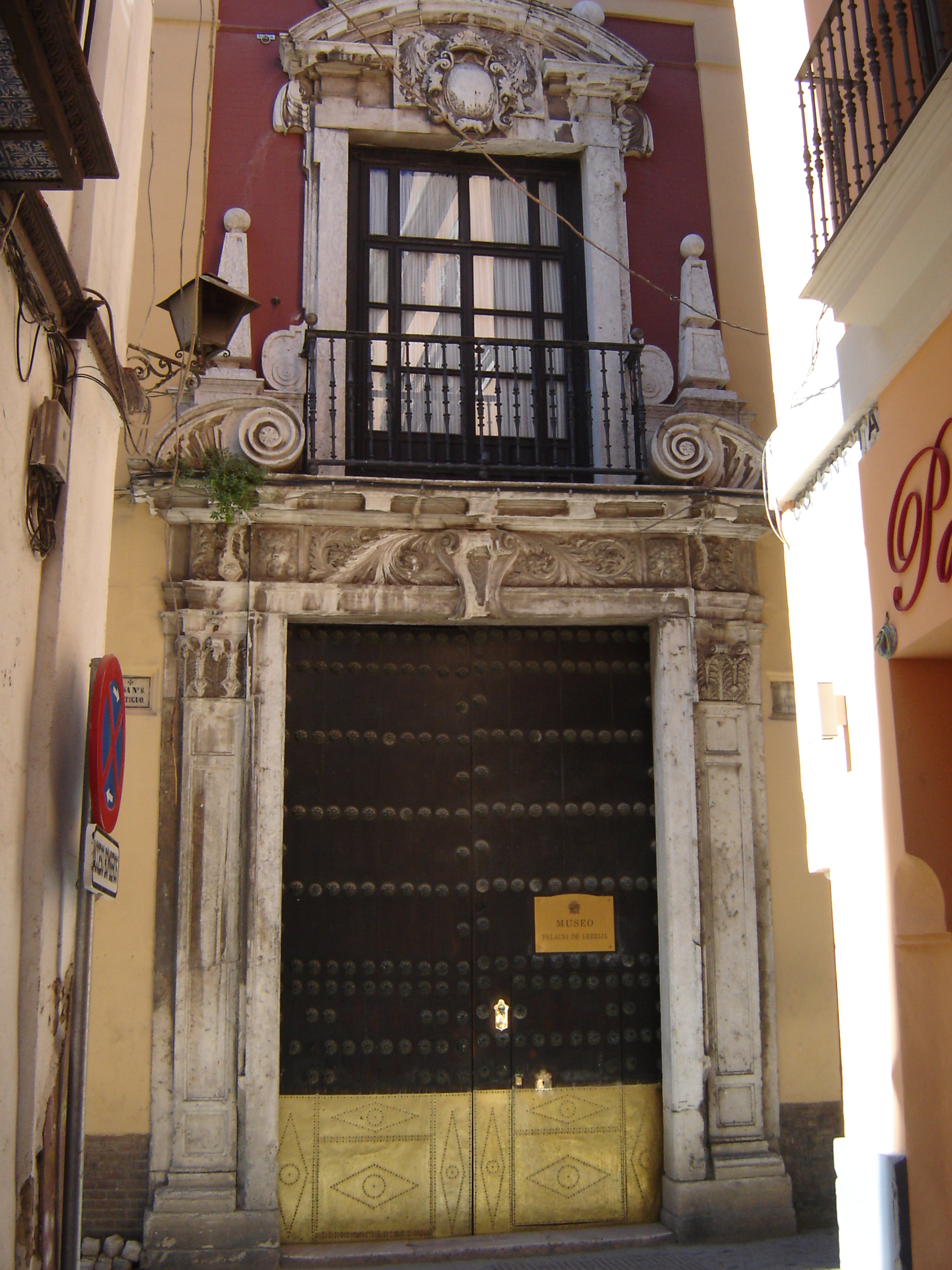

The Lebrija Palace or Palacio de la Condesa de Lebrija is a house museum in central Seville, Spain. Dating to the 16th century and remodeled between the 18th and 20th centuries, the palace is characterised by its collection of art, including Roman mosaics and other antiquities as well as Asian art, paintings by European masters and European decorative arts.

The interior of the palace is decorated in a palette of architectural styles, with elements such as Moorish arches, Plateresque decoration, tilework retrieved from ruined convent, a coffered ceiling from a 16th-century palace and a Renaissance frieze, while its façade and layout reflect typical Andalusian style.

== History ==
Construction of the palace as a noble house began in the 15th century, and its façade was built in the 16th century. The palace went on to be remodelled and extended between the 18th and 20th centuries. When built it belonged to the Paiba family. The palace was then owned by various nobles over the years, including the Count of Corbos and Counts of Miraflores. In 1901 it was bought by Regla Manjón Mergelina, Countess of Lebrija, who restored and reconstructed the palace to house her valuable collection of antiquities. She had a passion for archaeology and adorned the palace with artefacts found during her excavations, as well as those bought from other archaeologists, friends of the countess. The palace covers 2500 m^{2} across two floors; the ground floor was used during the summer and the upper floor during winter.

== Collection ==
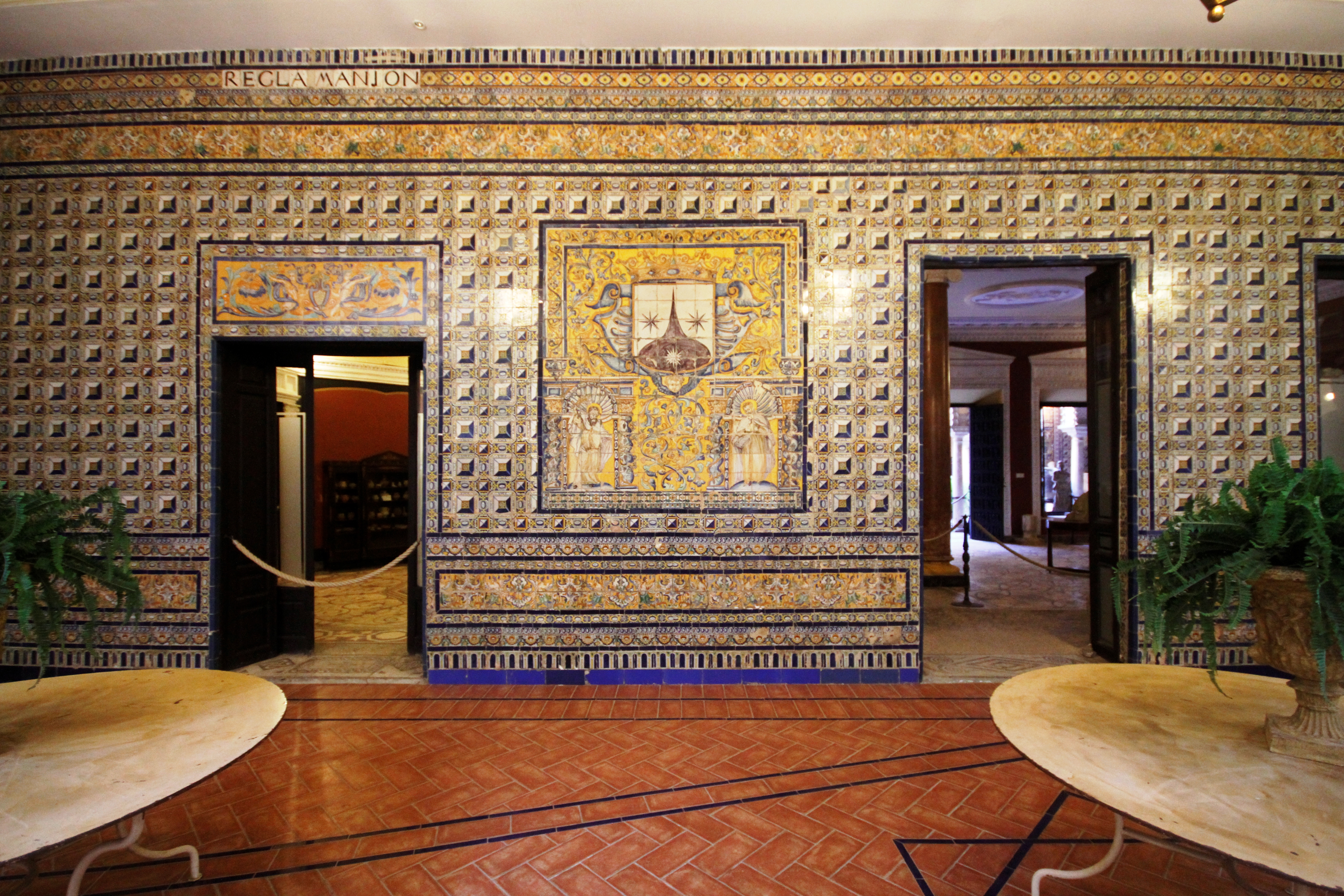
The azulejos of its walls are of the year 1585.

The collection includes Roman mosaics, taken from the historical site of Italica, that pave almost the entire ground floor. Spanish historian Juan de Contreras y López de Ayala called the building the 'best paved house-palace in Europe'. Of particular note is the mosaic depicting the god Pan that was discovered on land owned by the countess and can be found in the palace's central courtyard. The mosaic's central medallion represents Pan, who is serenading Galatea on his flute, while the other medallions show the love stories of Zeus and the corners contain representations of the four seasons.

Also noteworthy is the opus sectile work, made up of multi-coloured marbles, that paves the entrance hall. The house is filled with Greco-Roman busts, mythological depictions in various forms, and pieces from the Moorish era, China and Persia. There is a fine collection of well curbs, amphoras, columns and sculptures. Paintings of particular importance include original oils by Van Dyke, Brueghel the Elder, and the school of Murillo. On the upper floor there is also a library containing over 4000 books and essays.

== The Palace Museum ==
In 1999, descendants of the Countess and current owners opened the house to the public as a museum. Visitors may explore the ground floor at will. There are also guided tours of the upper floor throughout the day. The richly appointed rooms on this floor have been left as the family lived in them; they include sitting rooms, a private chapel, dining room and library, all of which contain a multitude of ornaments and major works of art.
