= Santiponce =

- Municipality
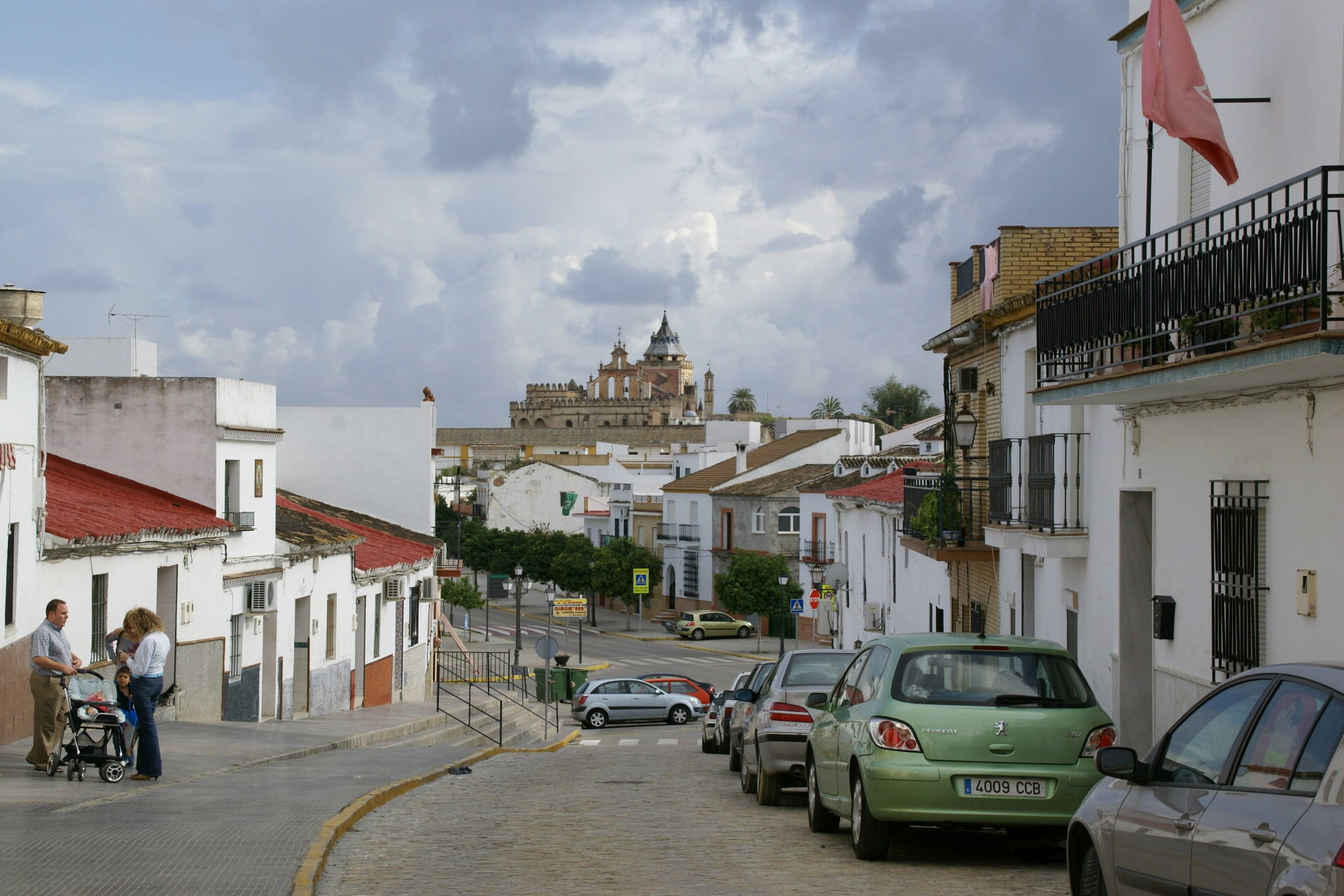

- Flag Coat of arms

- Location within Province of Seville Location within Andalusia Location within Spain
- Coordinates: 37°26′7″N 6°2′36″W
- Country: Spain
- Autonomous community: Andalusia
- Province: Seville
- Comarca: Aljarafe
- Judicial district: Santiponce

Government
  - Mayor: Carolina Casanova Román (PSOE-A)

Area
  - Total: 8.38 km^{2} (3.24 sq mi)
- Elevation: 18 m (59 ft)

Population (2025-01-01)
  - Total: 8,634
  - Density: 1,030/km^{2} (2,670/sq mi)
- Demonym: Poncino
- Time zone: UTC+1 (CET)
  - Summer (DST): UTC+2 (CEST)
- Postal code: 41970
- Official language(s): Spanish

Santiponce is a town located in the province of Seville, Spain. According to the 2006 census (INE), the town has a population of 7742 inhabitants.

The town contains the ruins of the Roman city Italica.

== See also ==
- List of municipalities in Seville
