= Italica =

Ancient Roman city, now in Spain

- Itálica (Spanish)
- Location within Spain
- 37°26′38″N 6°02′48″W
- Type: Settlement
- Cultures: Roman
- Location: Santiponce (Seville), Spain
- Region: Hispania Baetica

History
- Built: 206 BC

Site notes
- Condition: Ruins

Spanish Cultural Heritage
- Type: Non-movable
- Criteria: Archaeological site
- Designated: 13 December 1912
- Reference no.: RI-55-0000002

Italica (Spanish: Itálica) was an ancient Roman city in Hispania; its site is close to the town of Santiponce in the province of Seville, Spain. It was founded in 206 BC by Roman general Scipio as a colonia for his Italic veterans and named after them. Italica later grew attracting new migrants from the Italian peninsula and also with the children of Roman soldiers and native women. Among the Italic settlers were a branch of the gens Ulpia from the Umbrian city of Tuder and a branch of the gens Aelia from the city of Hadria, either co-founders of the town or later migrants who arrived at an unknown time; the Ulpi Traiani and the Aelii Hadriani were the respective stirpes of the Roman emperors Trajan and Hadrian, both born in Italica.

According to some authors, Italica was also the birthplace of Theodosius.

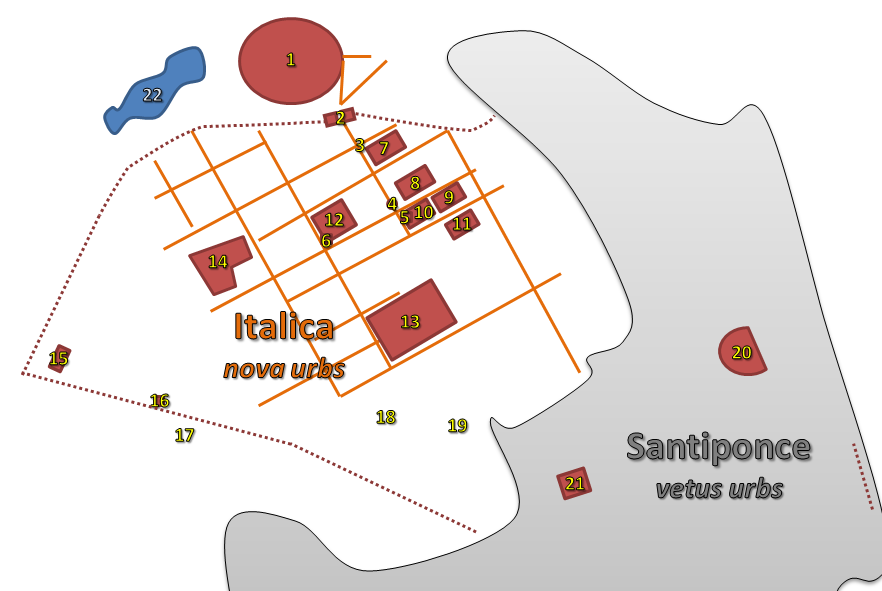
Map of the site

== History ==
=== Foundation ===
From this time, which was a little before the 144th Olympiad [206 BC], the Romans began to send prætors to Spain yearly to the conquered nations as governors or superintendents to keep the peace. Scipio left them a small force suitable for a peace establishment, and settled his sick and wounded soldiers in a town which he named Italica after Italy: this was the native place of Trajan and Hadrian, who afterwards became emperors of Rome.

— Appian, Iberian Wars, Book VII, Chapter 38

Italica was the first Roman settlement in Spain. It was founded in 206 BC by Publius Cornelius Scipio during the Second Punic War close to a native Iberian town of the Turdetani (dating back at least to the 4th c. BC) as a settlement for his Italic veterans, a mixture of socii and Roman citizens, and therefore named Italica after its inhabitants. The nearby native and Roman city of Hispalis (Seville) was and would remain a larger city, but Italica's importance derived from its illustrious origin and from the fact that it was close enough to the Guadalquivir to control the area.

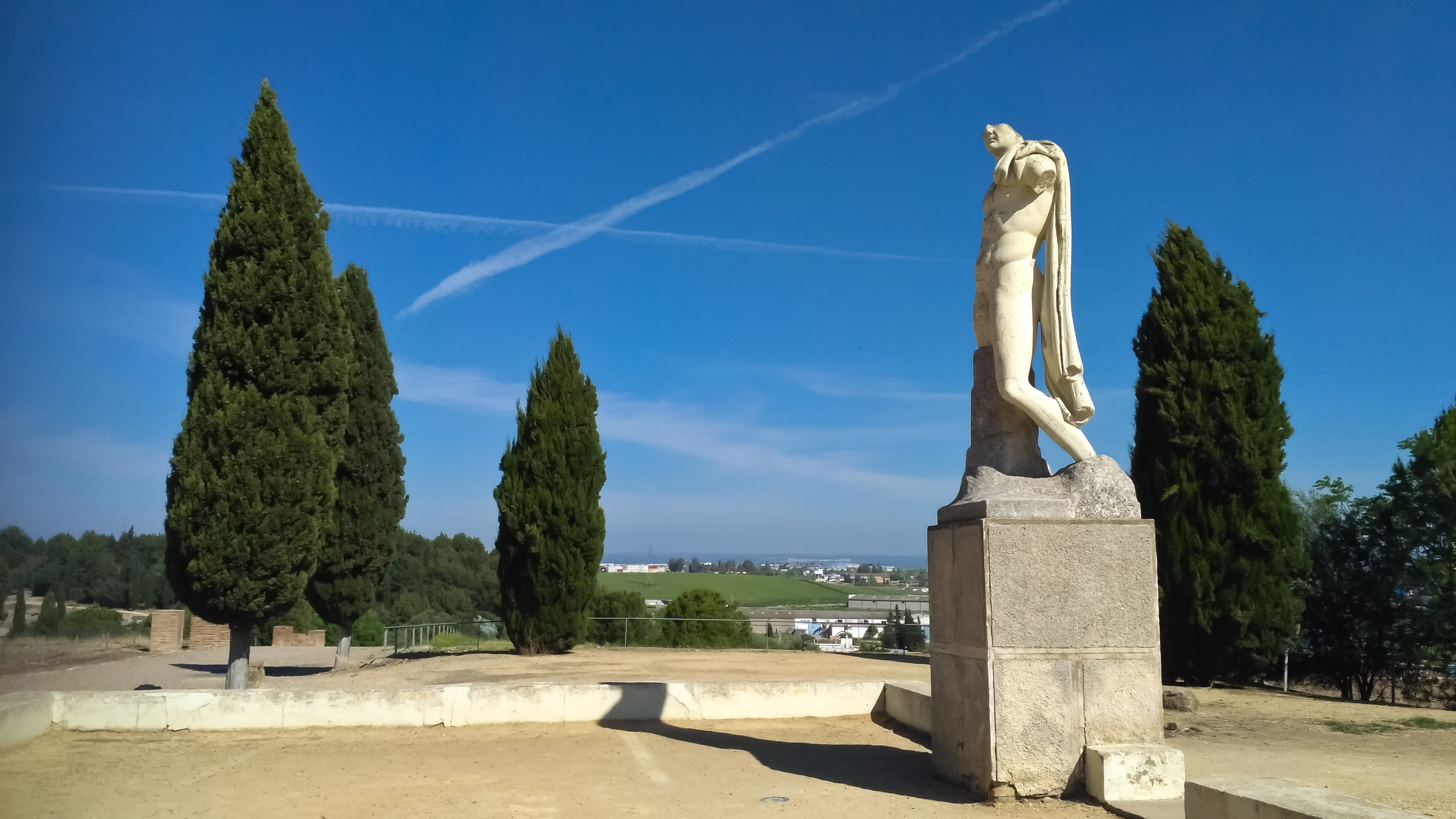
Statue of Trajan

The vetus urbs (original or "old" city) developed into a prosperous city and was built on a Hippodamian street plan with public buildings and a forum at the centre, linked to a busy river port. Italica thrived especially under the patronage of Hadrian, like many other cities in the empire under his influence at this time, but it was especially favoured as his birthplace. He expanded the city northwards as the nova urbs (new city) and, upon its request, elevated it to the status of colonia as Colonia Aelia Augusta Italica even though Hadrian expressed his surprise as it already enjoyed the rights of "Municipium". He also added temples, including the enormous and unique Traianeum in the centre of the city to venerate his predecessor and adopted father, and rebuilt public buildings.

Italica started to dwindle as early as the 3rd century, when a shift of the Guadalquivir River bed left its river port high and dry, while Hispalis continued to grow nearby. The river's shift was probably due to siltation, a widespread problem in antiquity that followed removal of the forest cover.

=== Late Antiquity ===
The city may have been the birthplace of the emperor Theodosius I and of his eldest son Arcadius (born in Spain in 377 A.D., during his father's exile).

Italica was important enough in late Antiquity to have a bishop of its own, and had a garrison during the Visigothic age. The walls were restored by Leovigildo in 583 AD during his struggles against Hermenegildo.

== Rediscovery and excavations ==
In recent centuries, the ruins became the subject of visits, admiration and despair by many foreign travellers who wrote about and sometimes illustrated their impressions. Italica's prestige, history and fame were not enough, however, to save it from being the subject of continued looting, and a permanent quarry for materials from Ancient times to modern ones. In 1740 the city of Seville ordered demolition of the walls of the amphitheatre to build a dam on the Guadalquivir, and in 1796 the vetus urbs was used to build the new Camino Real of Extremadura. The first law of protection for the site took effect in 1810 under the Napoleonic occupation, reinstating its old name of Italica, and allocating an annual budget for regular excavation.

One of the first excavators was the British textile merchant and Seville resident Nathan Wetherell, who uncovered nearly ten Roman inscriptions in the vicinity of Italica in the 1820s that were later donated to the British Museum. Regular excavation, however, did not materialise until 1839–1840. When excavations intensified towards the end of the 19th century, some of the mosaic floors have been acquired by the Countess of Lebrija. They are conserved in the palace the countess had built for this purpose, the Palace of the Countess of Lebrija. The archeologist responsible for the excavations at the time Rodrigo Amador de los Ríos tried to revert what he considered to be robbery rather than conservation by the countess, but she did not indulge in his complaints. By Royal Order of 1912 Italica was declared a National Monument, but it was not until 2001 that the archaeological site of Italica and the areas of protection were clearly defined.

== The site ==
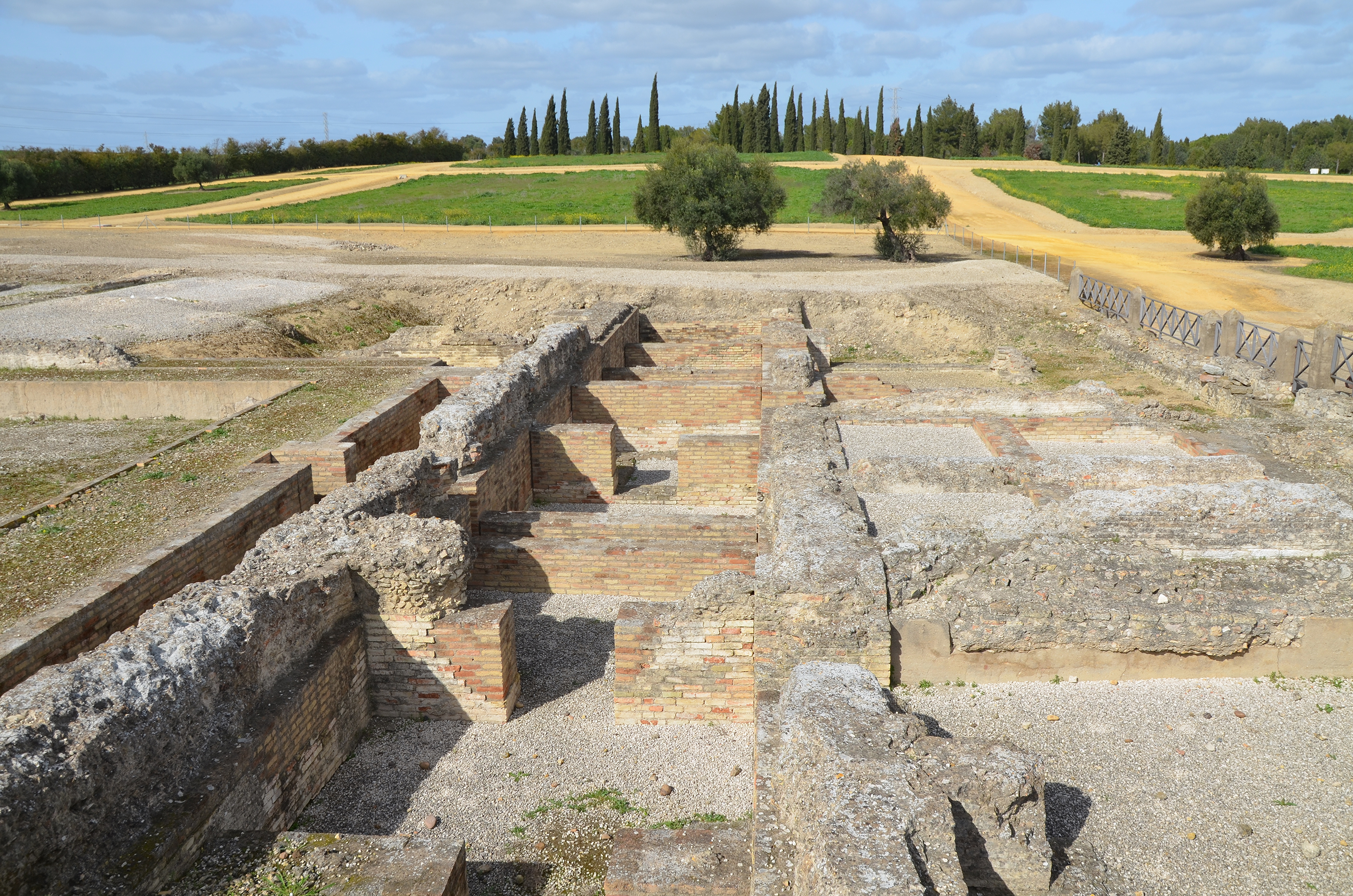
Major baths of Itálica: the Hadrianic Baths

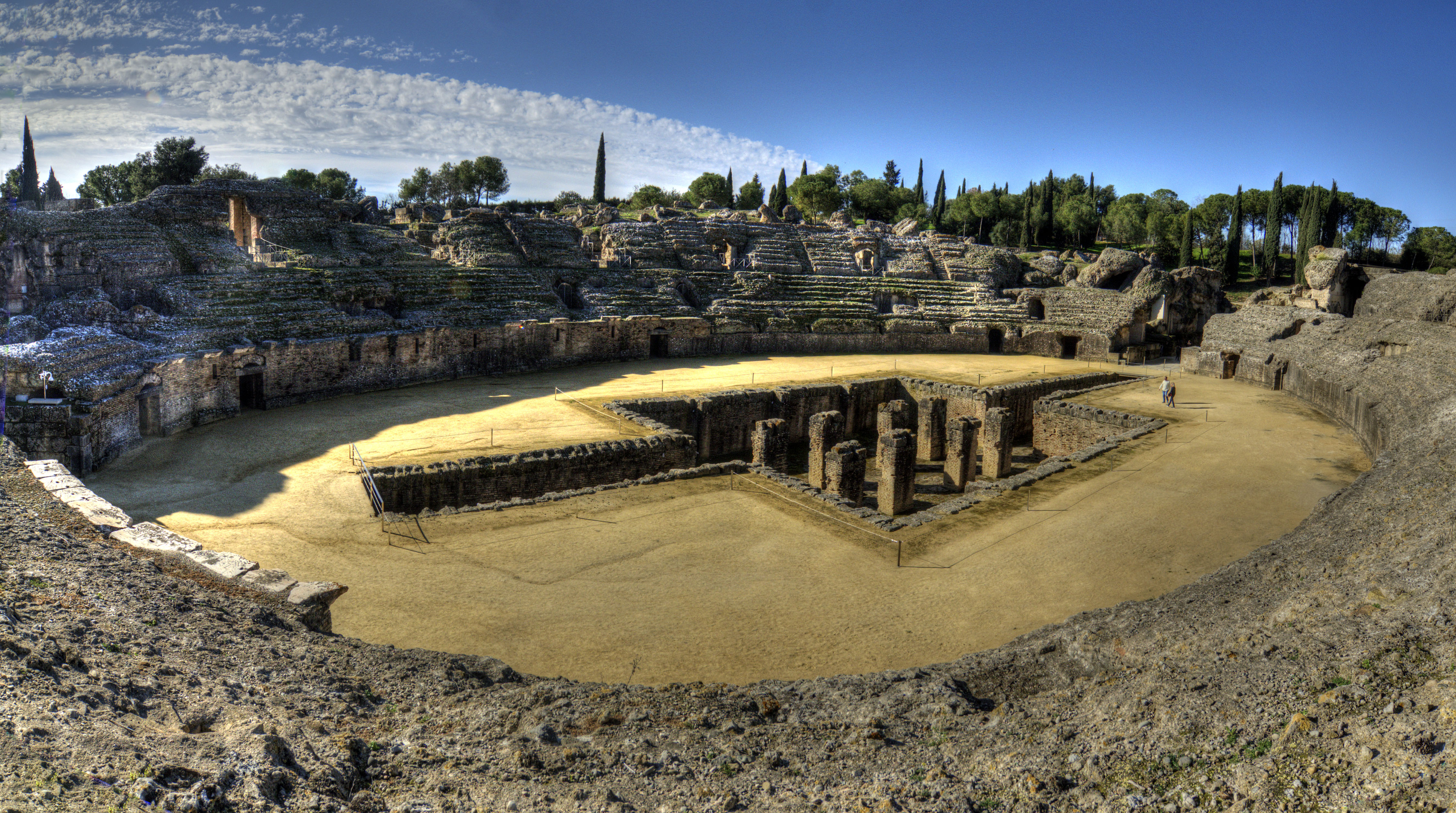
The Roman amphitheatre of Italica

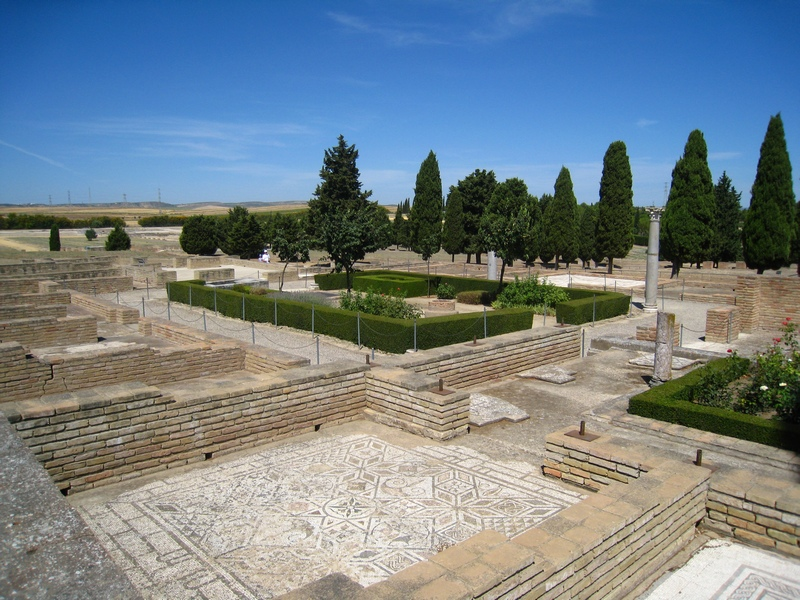
Mosaics in Italica

As no modern city covered many of Italica's buildings of the nova urbs, the result is an unusually well-preserved Roman city with cobbled Roman streets and mosaic floors still in situ. Many rich finds can also be seen in the Seville Archaeological Museum, with its famous marble statue of Trajan.

The archaeological site of Italica encompasses mainly the nova urbs with its many fine buildings from the Hadrianic period. The original vetus urbs (old town) lies under the present town of Santiponce.

Extensive excavation and renovation of the site has been done recently and is continuing.

The small baths and the Theatre are some of the oldest visible remains, both built before Hadrian.

Italica’s amphitheatre was the third largest in the Roman Empire at the time, being slightly larger than the Tours Amphitheatre in France. It seated 25,000 spectators, about half as many as the Colosseum in Rome. The size is surprising given that the city's population at the time is estimated to have been only 8,000, and shows that the local elite demonstrated status that extended far beyond Italica itself through the games and theatrical performances they funded as magistrates and public officials.

From the same period is the elite quarter with several beautiful (and expensive) houses decorated with splendid mosaics visible today, particularly the:

- House of the Exedra
- House of the Neptune Mosaic
- House of the Birds Mosaic
- House of the Planetarium Mosaic
- House of Hylas
- House of the Rhodian Patio.

=== The Traianeum ===
The Traianeum was a large, imposing temple in honour of the Emperor Trajan, built by his adopted son and successor, Hadrian. It occupies a central double insula at the highest point of nova urbs. It measures 108 x 80 m and is surrounded by a large porticoed square with alternating rectangular and semicircular exedra around its exterior housing sculptures. The temple precinct was decorated with over a hundred columns of expensive Cipollino marble from Euboea, and various fountains.

=== Aqueduct ===
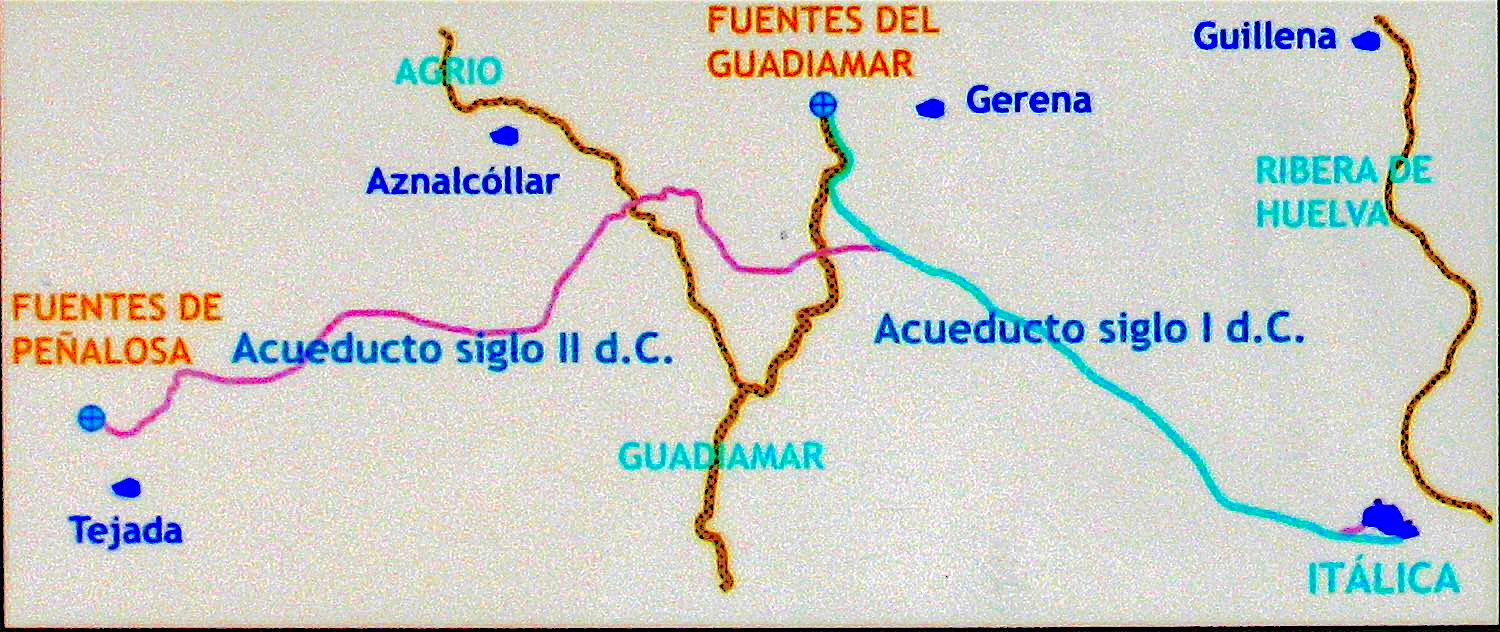
Route of aqueduct

The aqueduct of 37 km total length was first built in the 1st c. AD and extended under Hadrian to add a more distant source for supplying the expanded city. It fed a huge cistern at the edge of the city which remains intact. Some of the piers of the arches are still visible near the city.

== Gallery ==
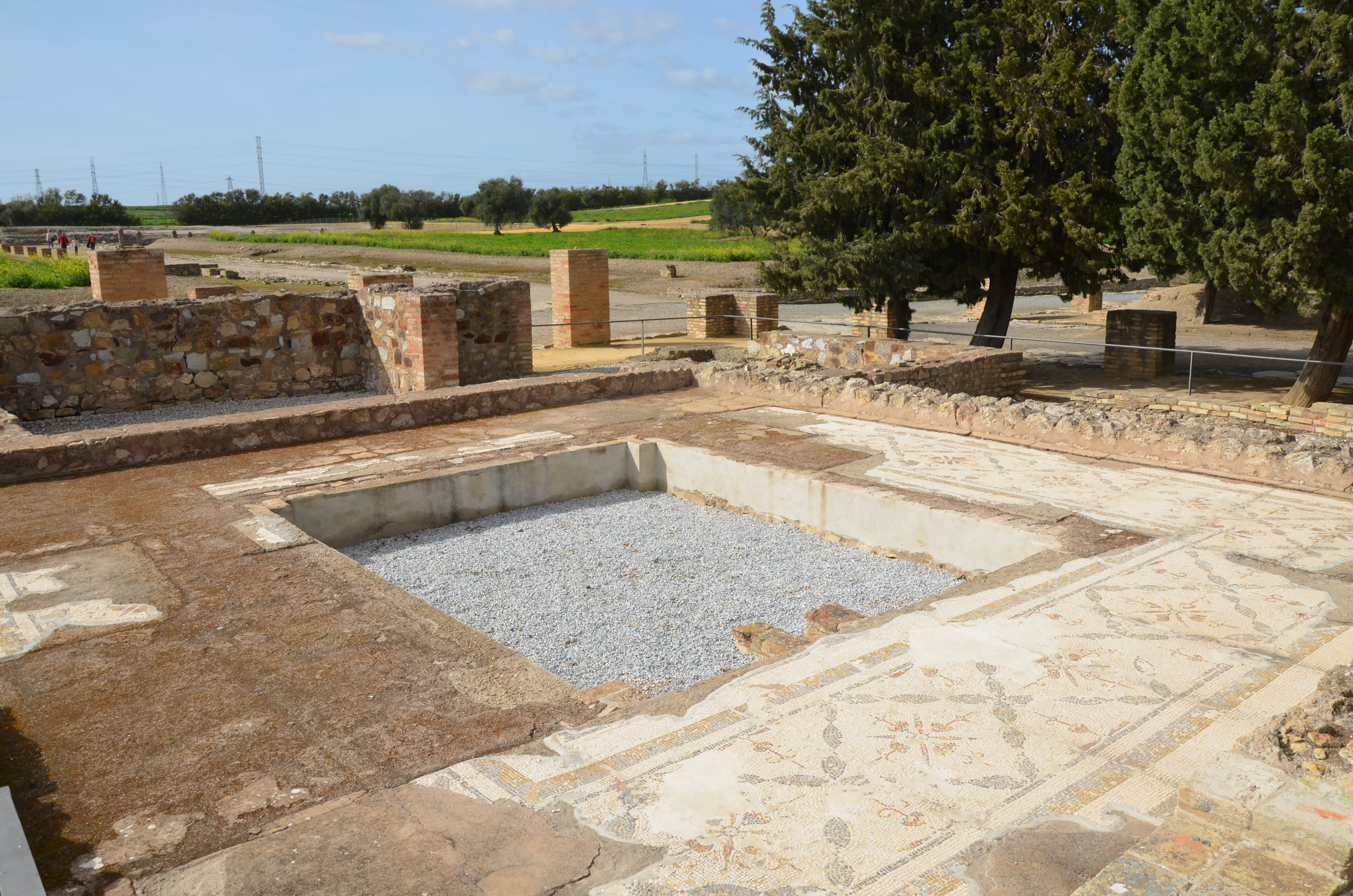
House of the Planetarium

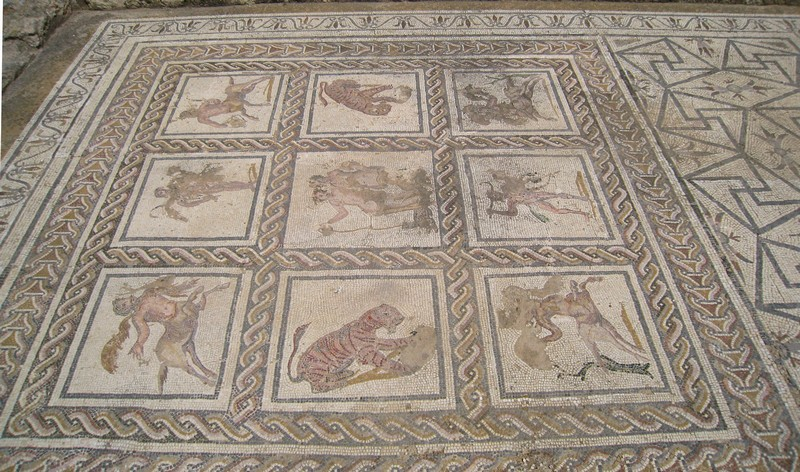
Detail of the Mosaic Floor of the House of the Planetarium

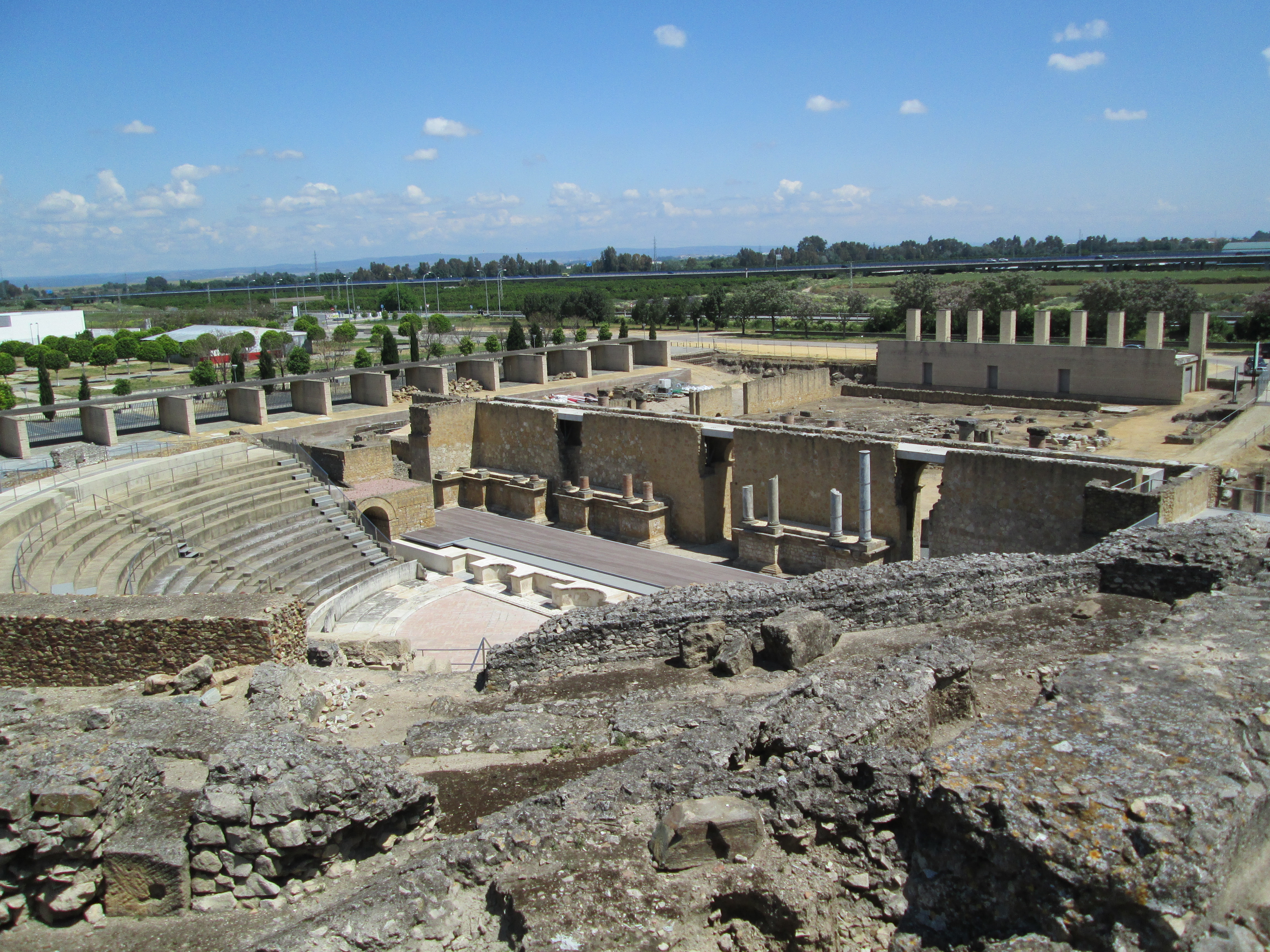
Ancient Roman Theater

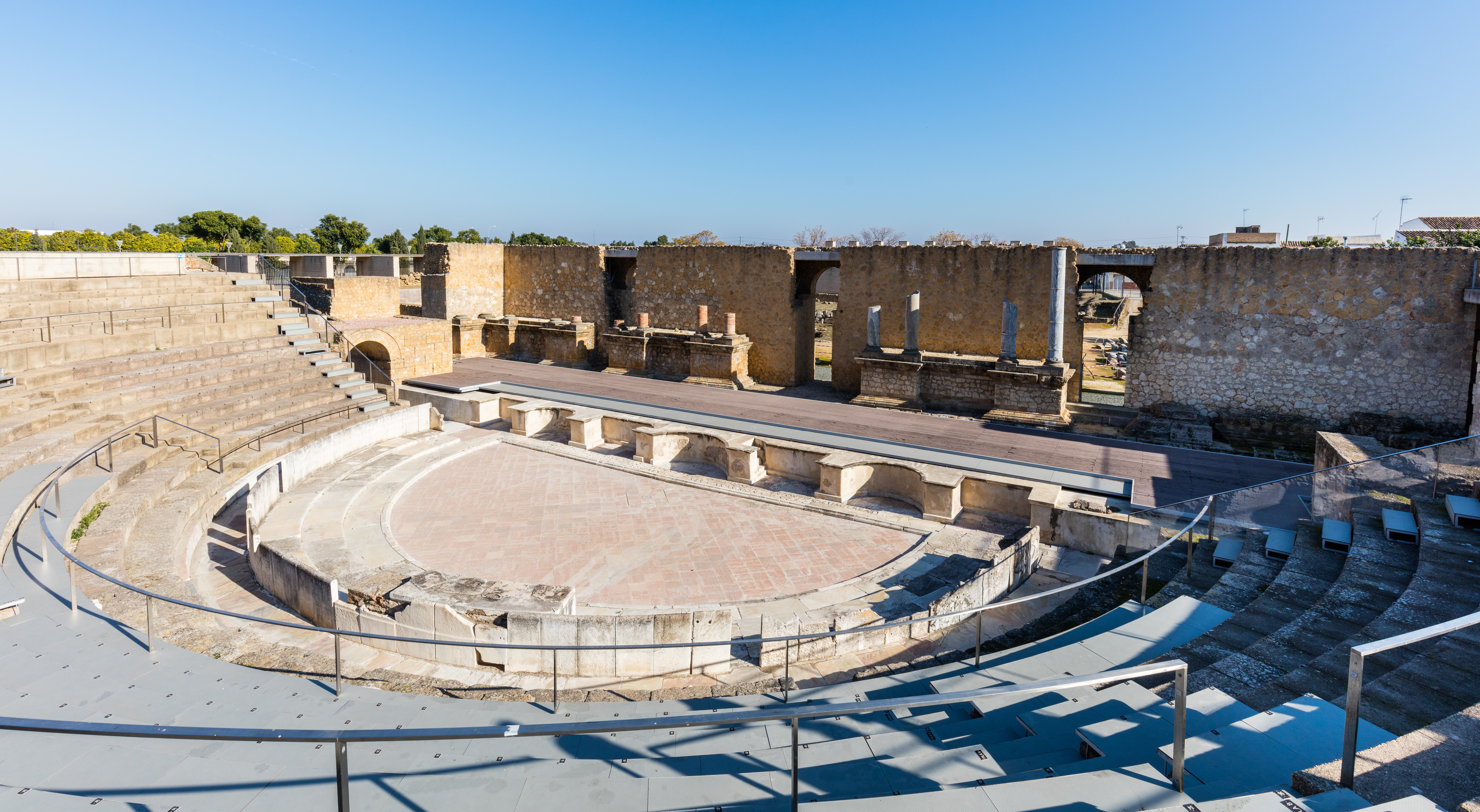
Detail of Roman Theater

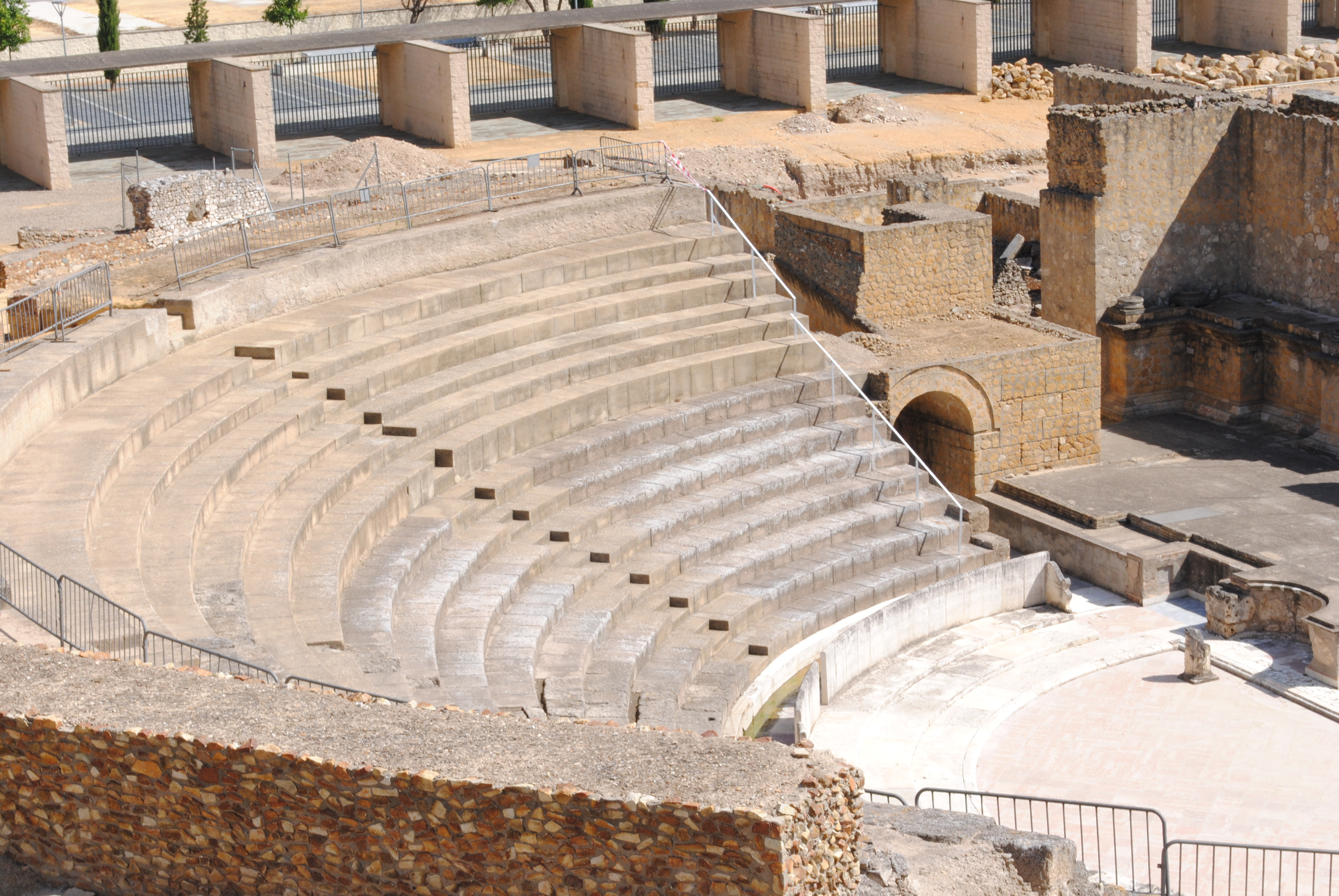
Detail of Roman Theater seating

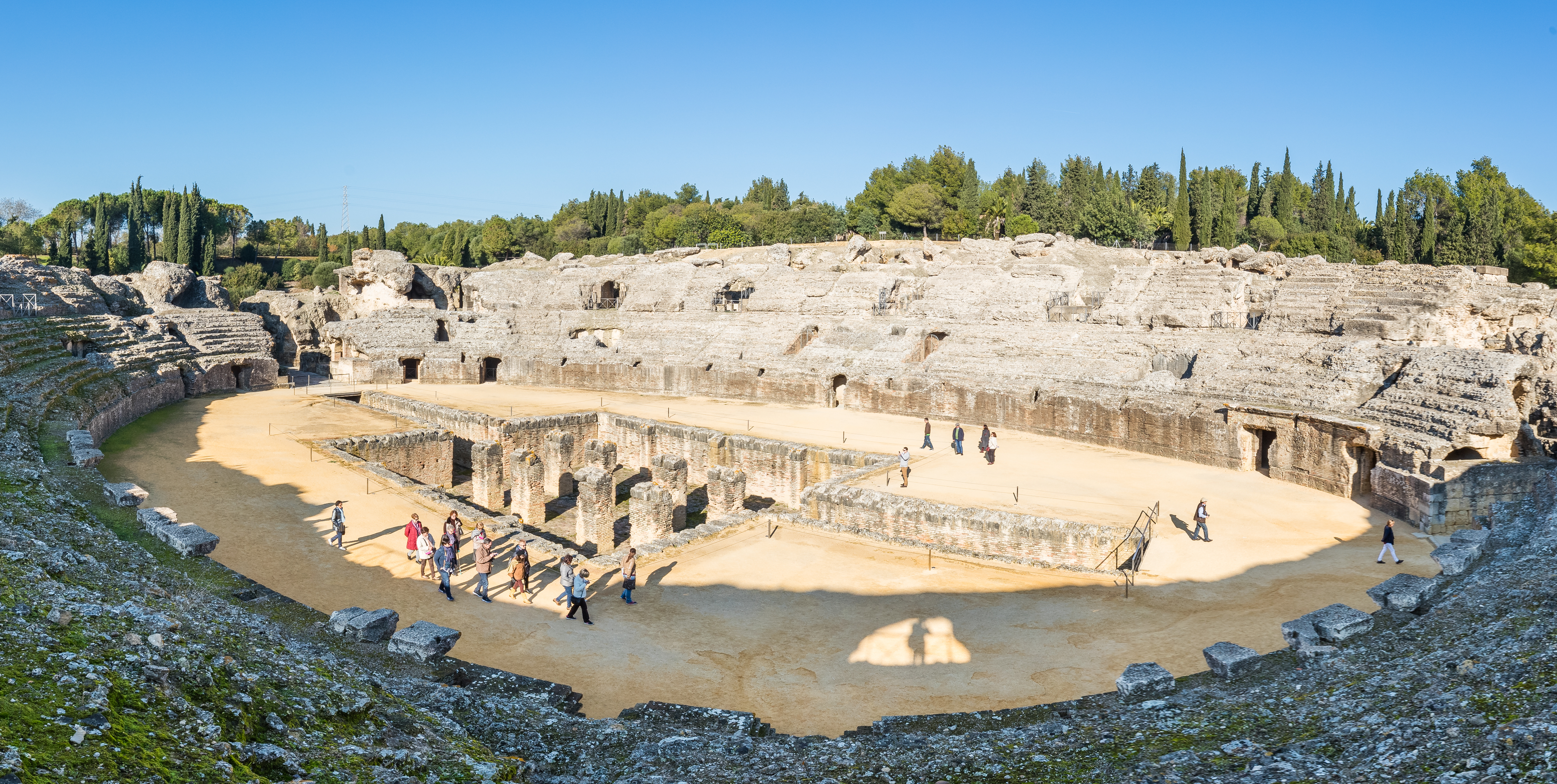
Ruins of Roman Amphitheater

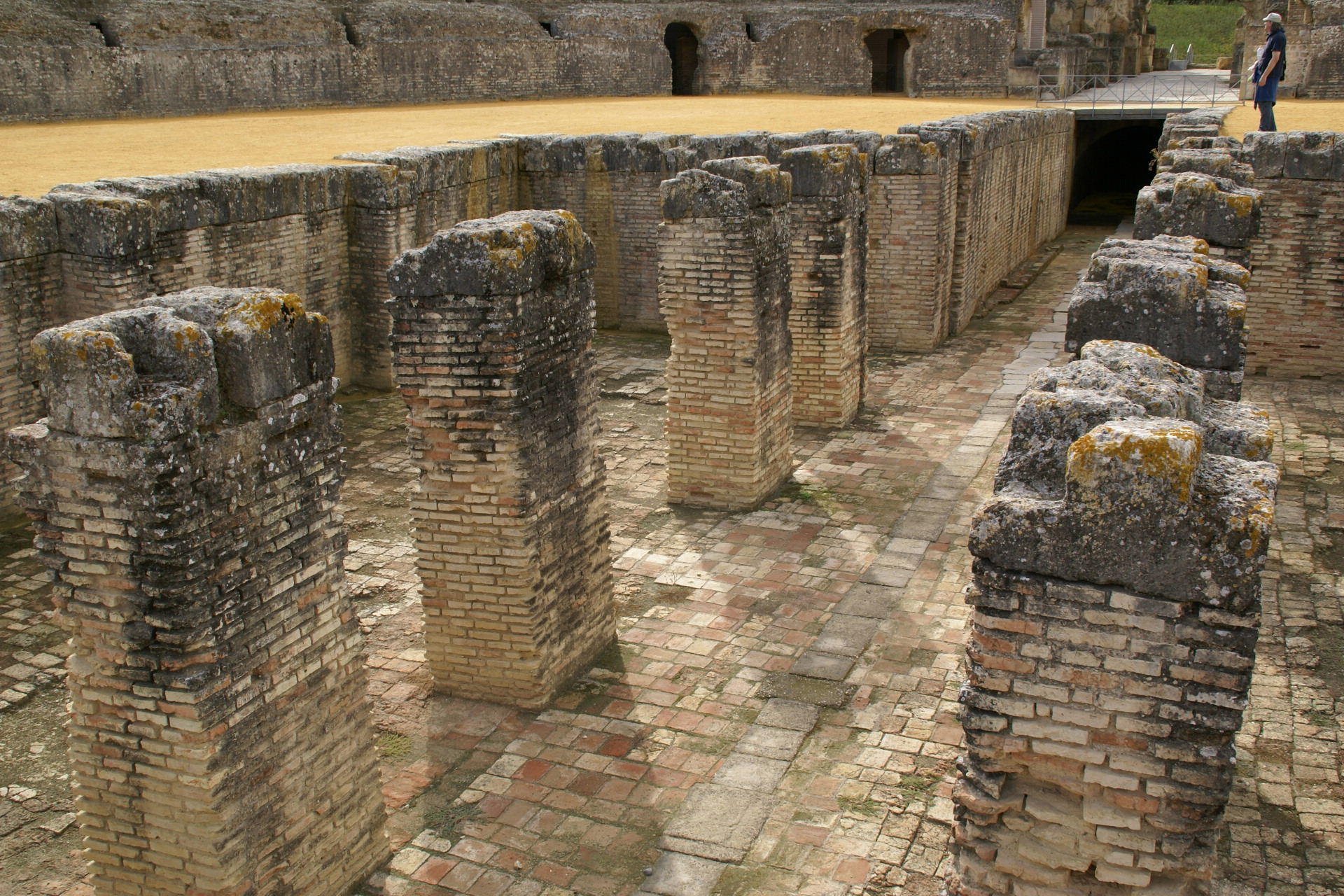
The Fossa Bestiaria in the center of the Roman amphitheater's arena

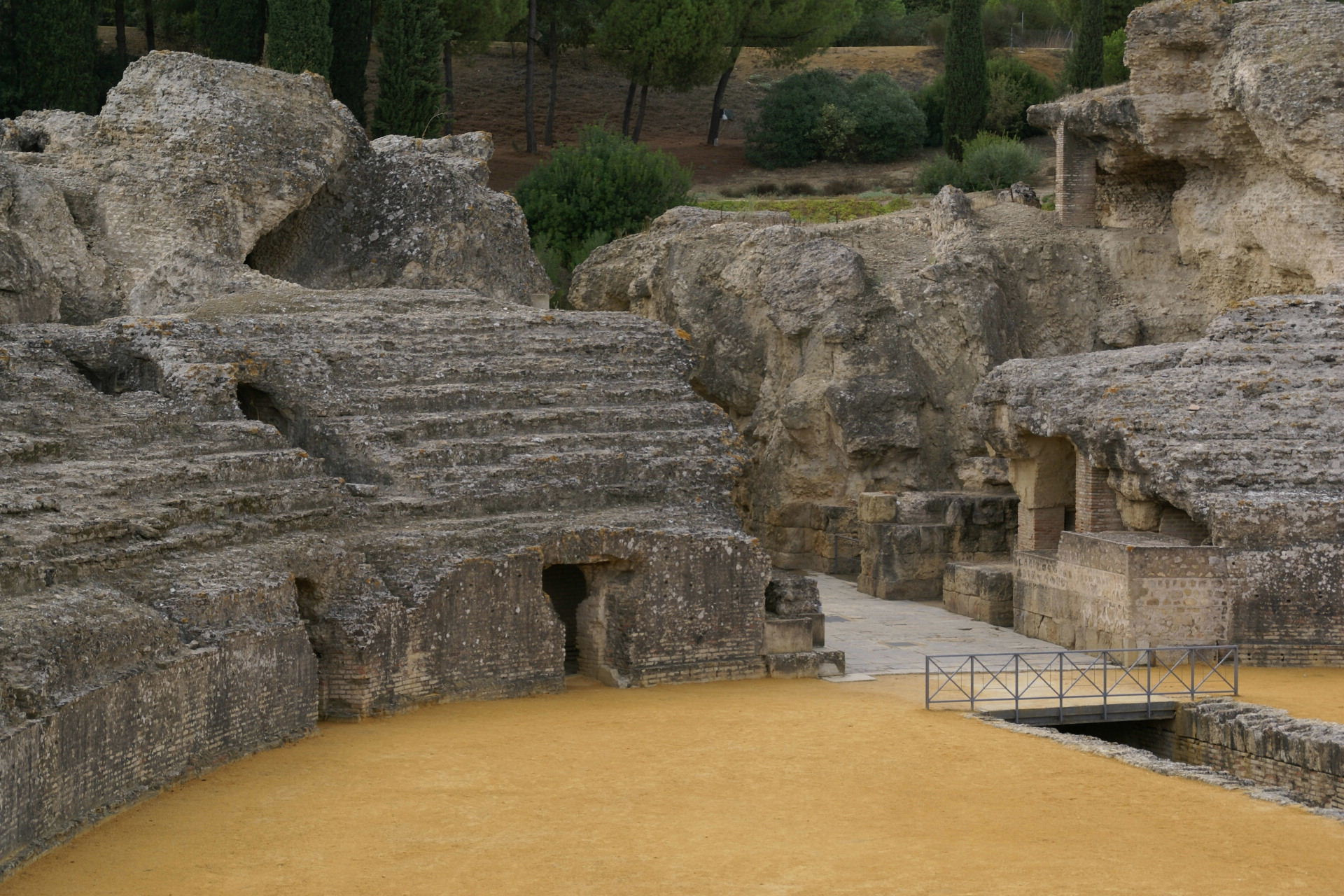
Ruins of seating area in Roman Amphitheater

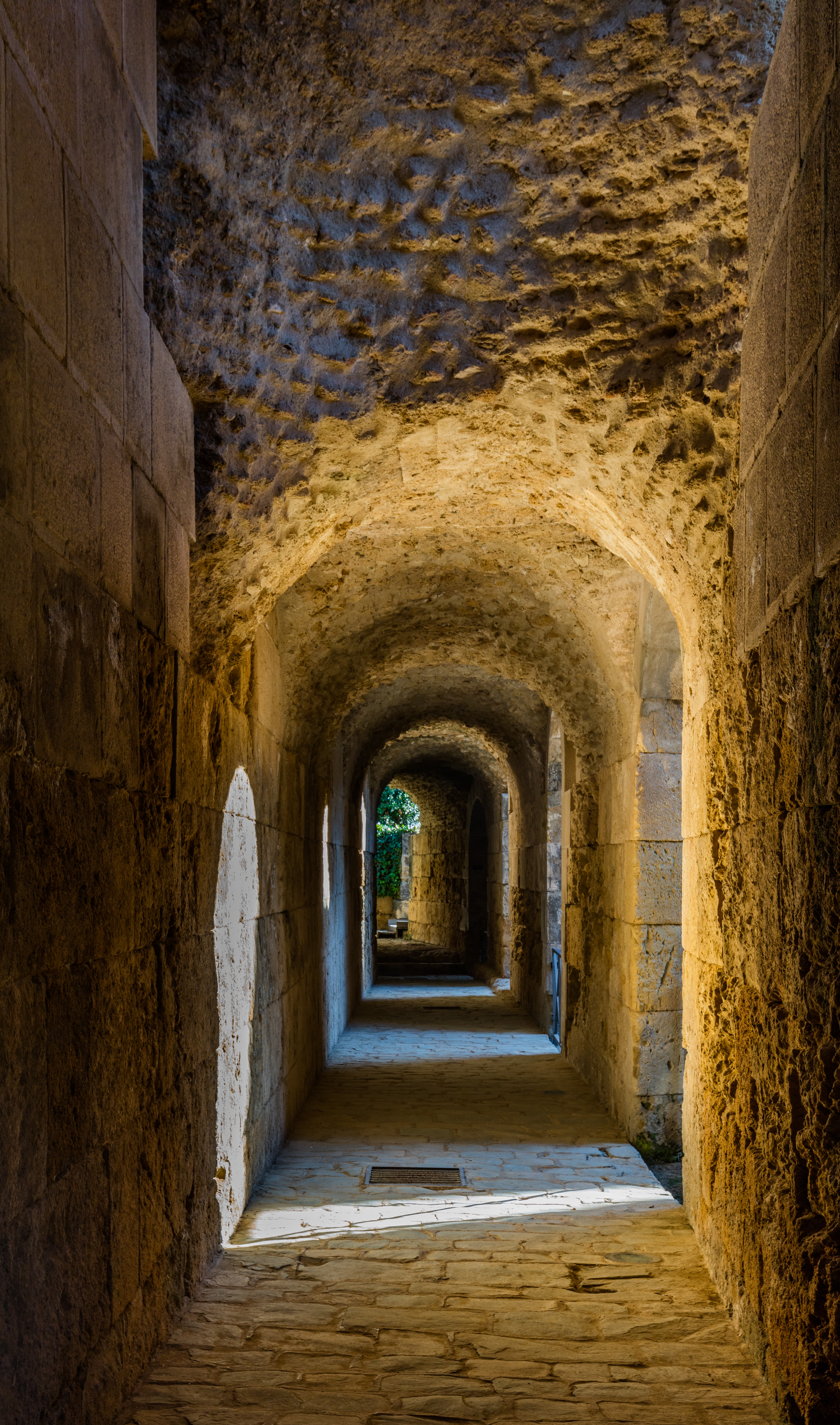
A vault in the amphitheatre

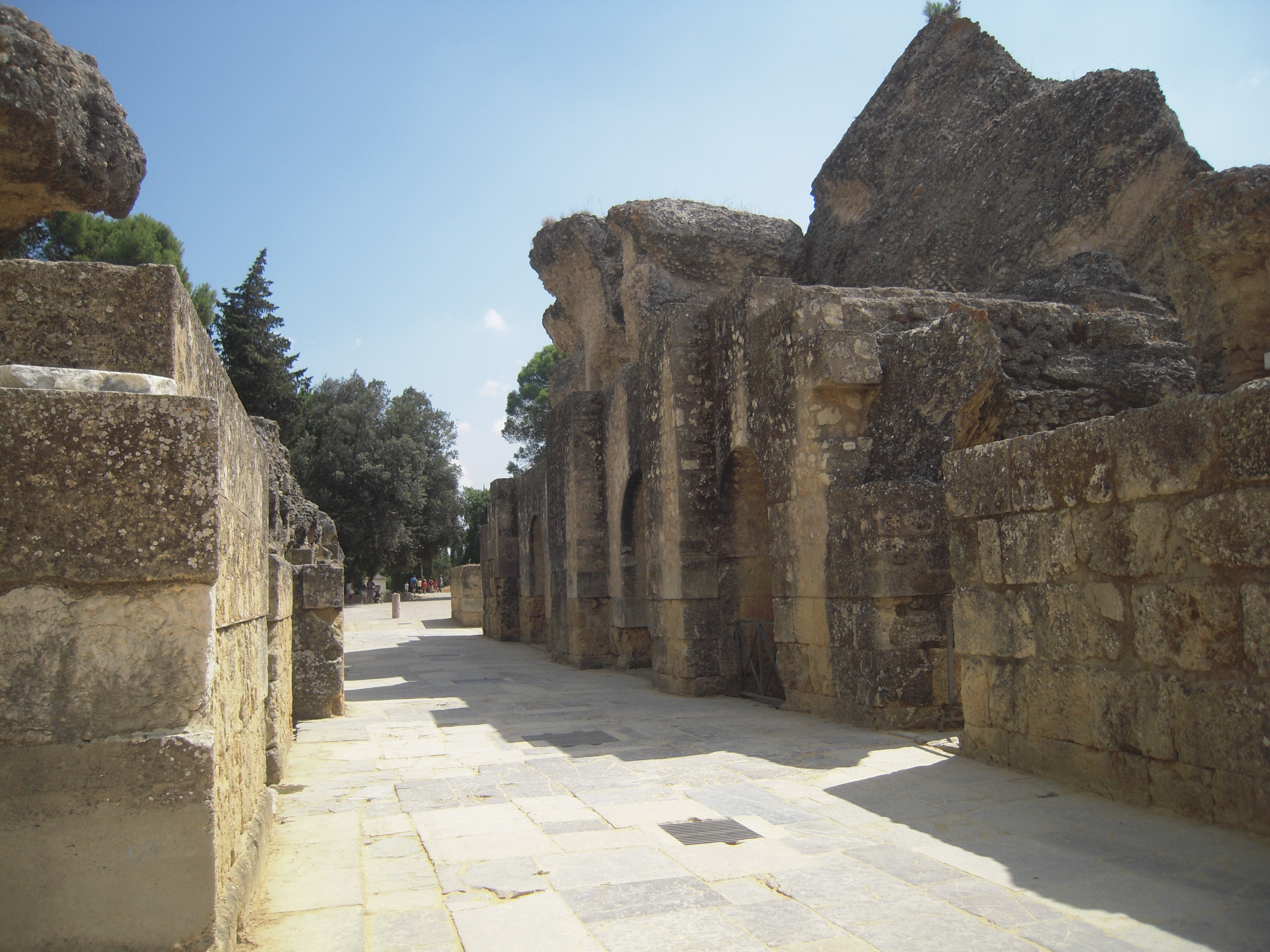
Roman Amphitheater

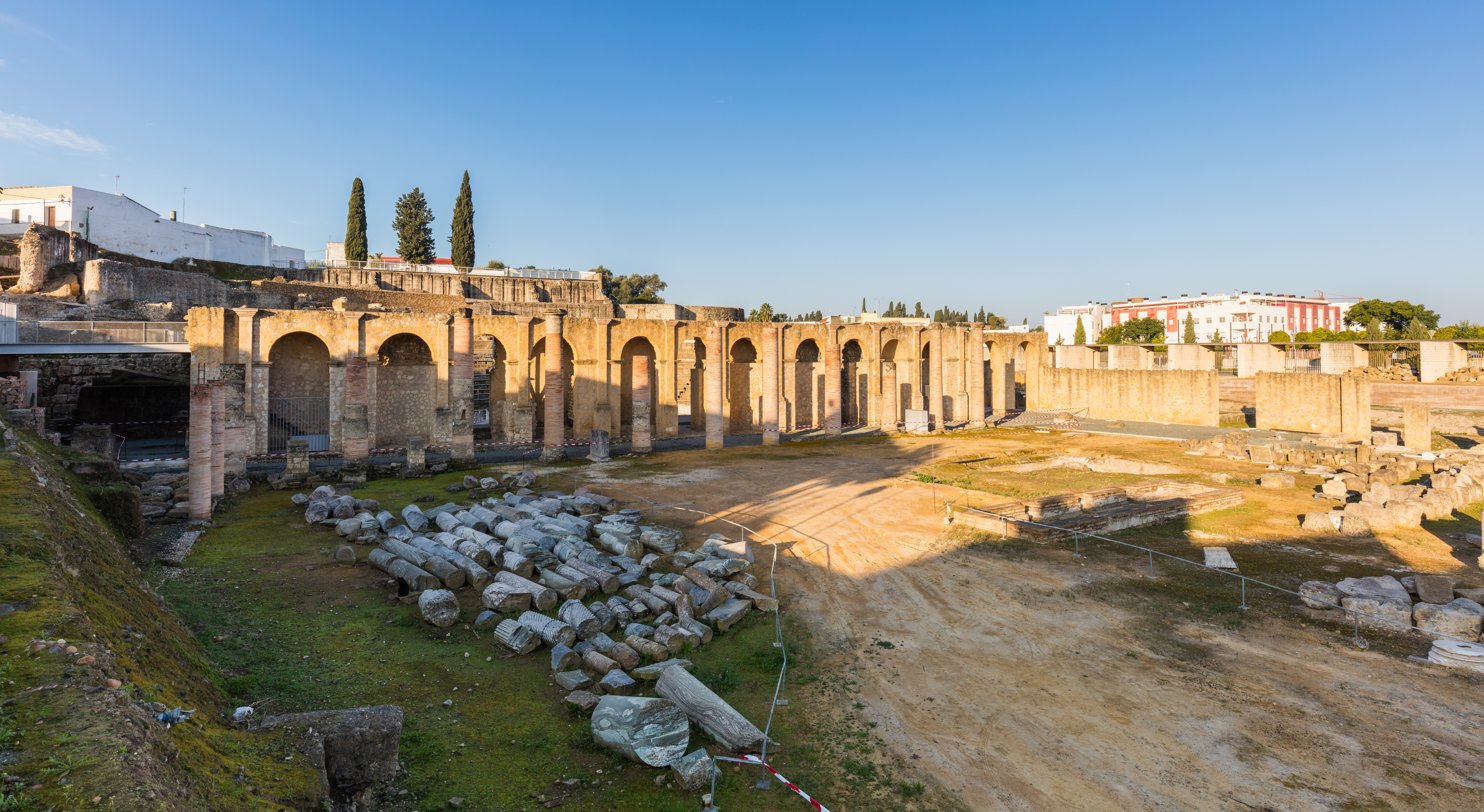
Panorama of exterior of Roman Theater

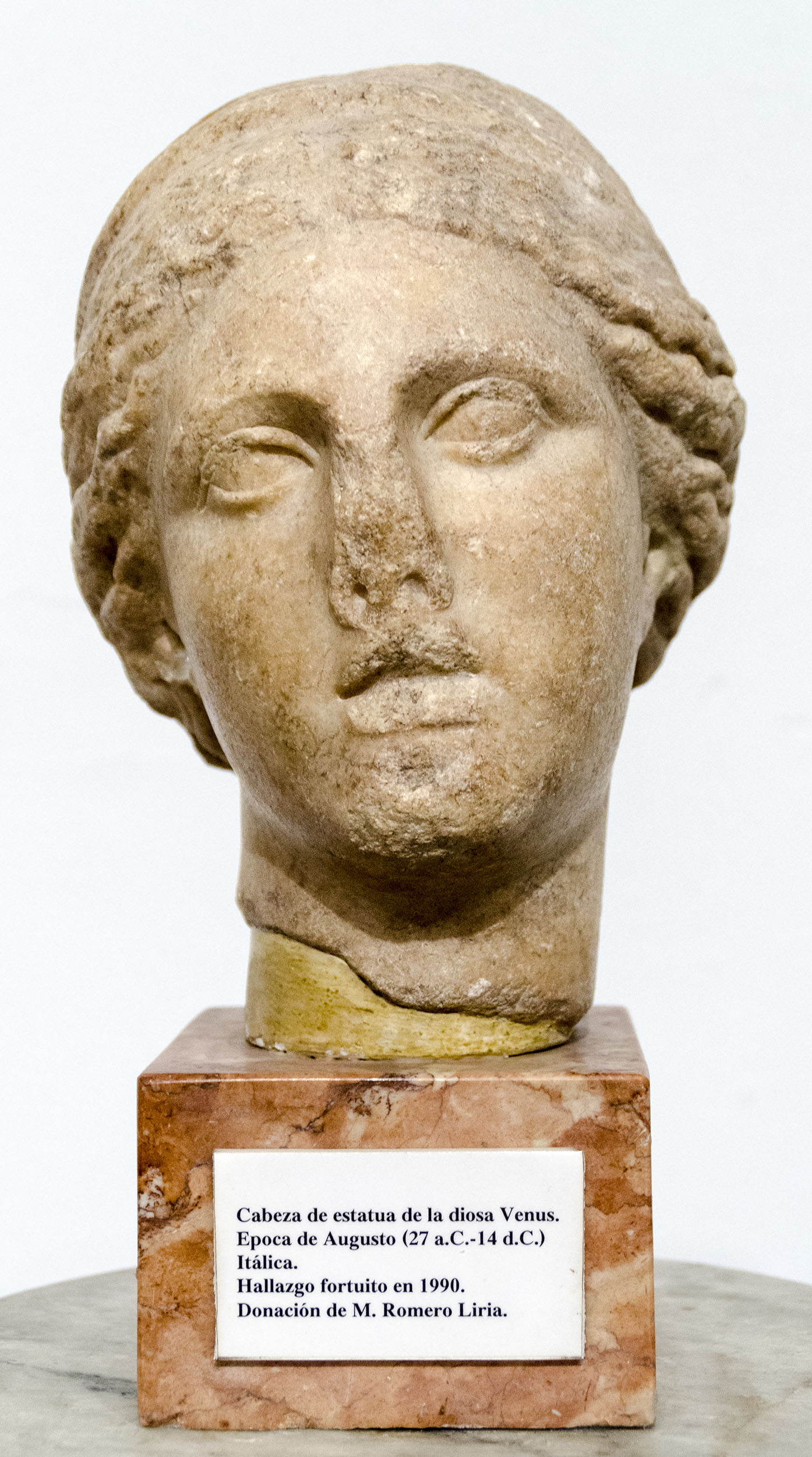
Venus head, found at Italica, Italica Archeological Museum

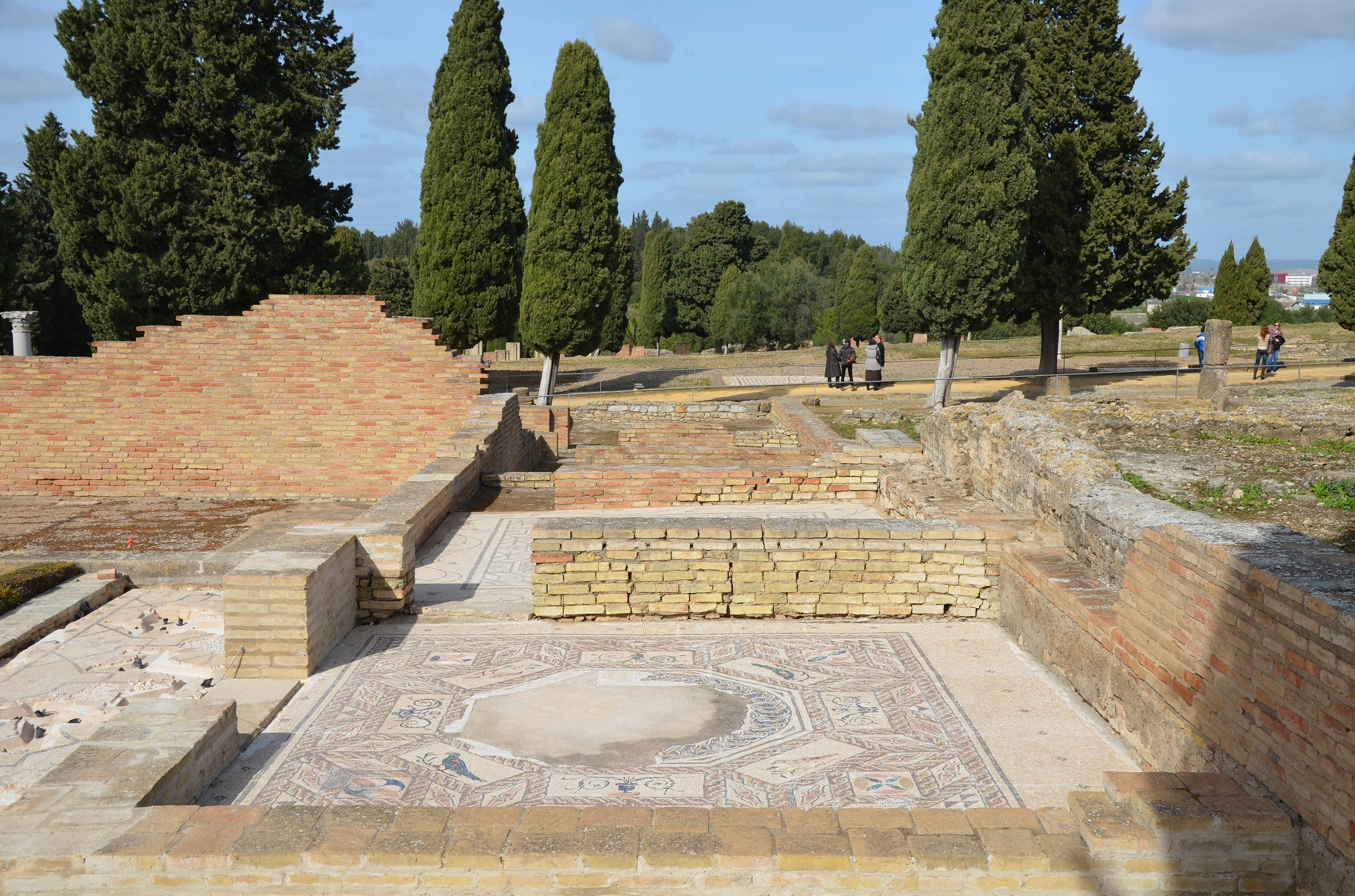
The House of the Birds, Italica, Spain

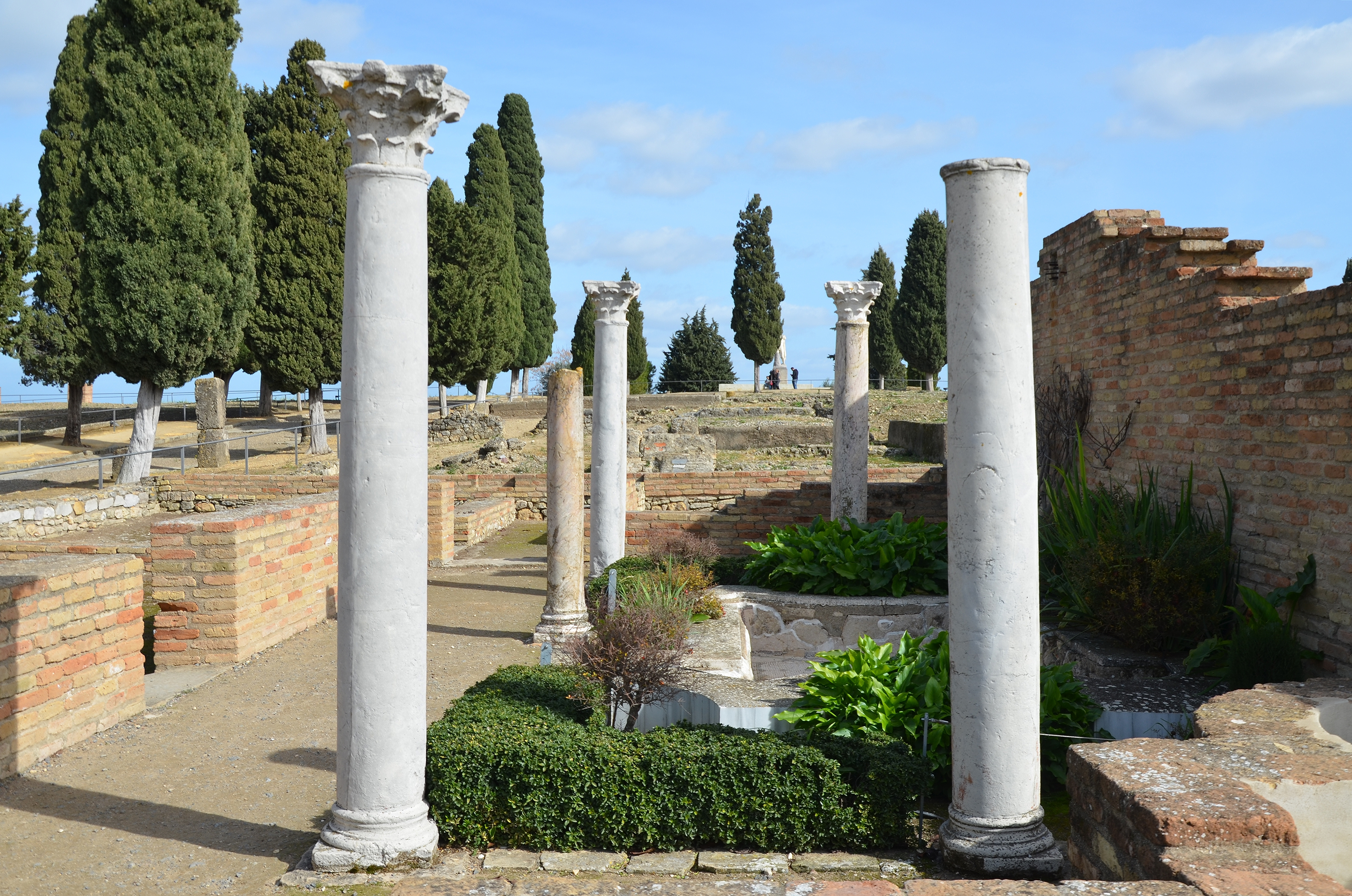
House of the Birds, Italica, Spain

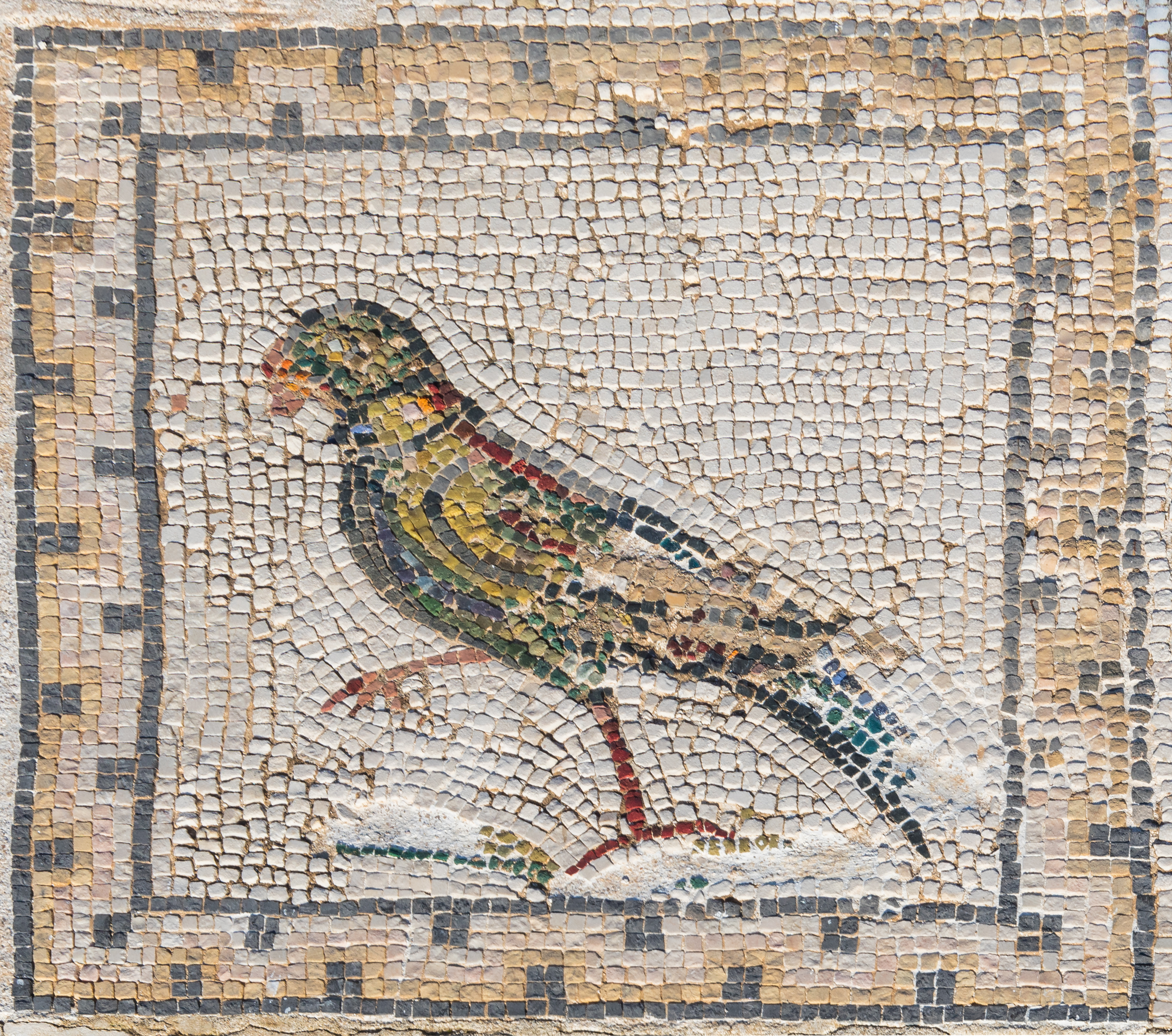
Bird mosaic floor

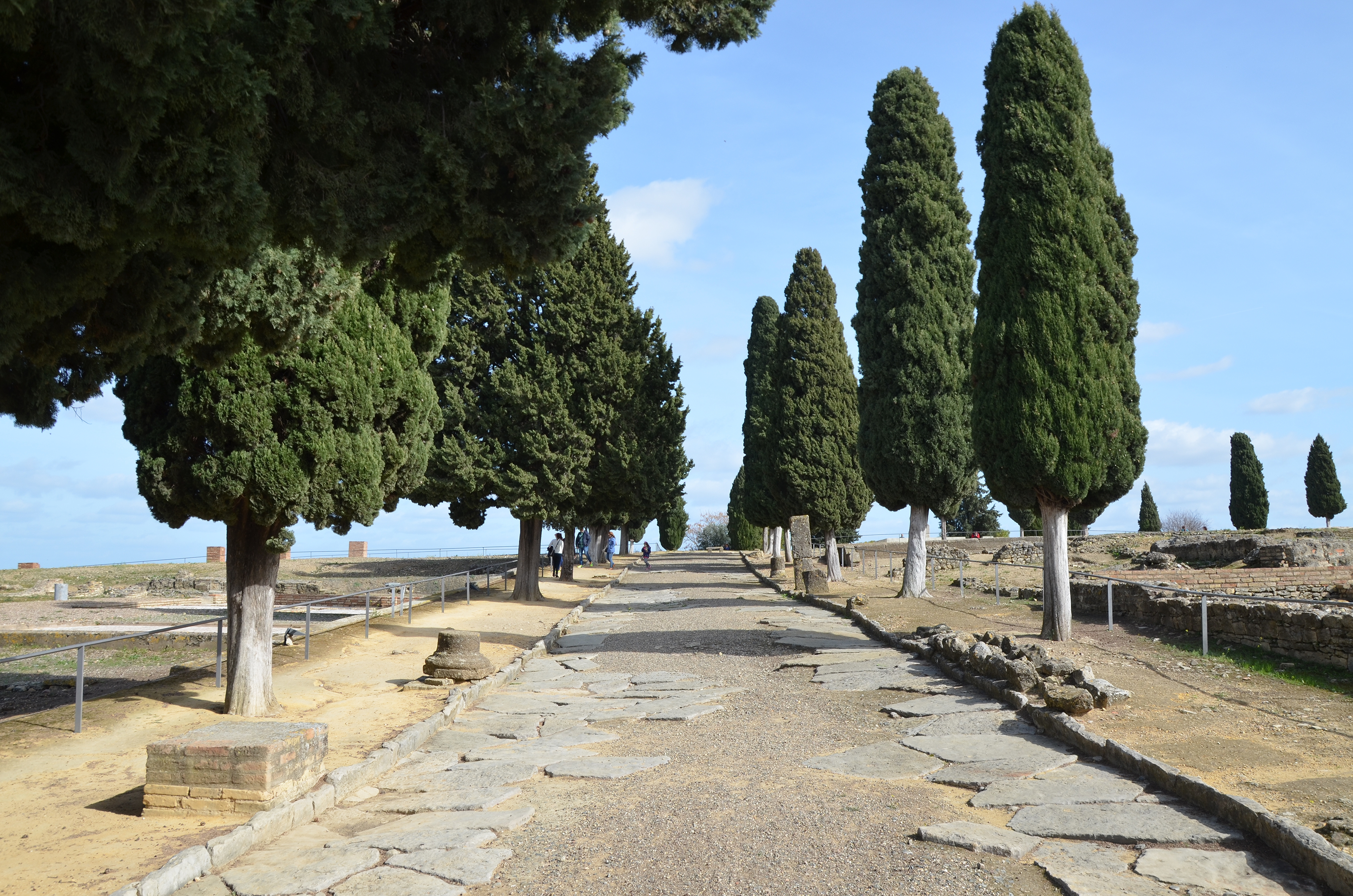
One of the minor Decumani betwen the house of the birds and the house of neptune

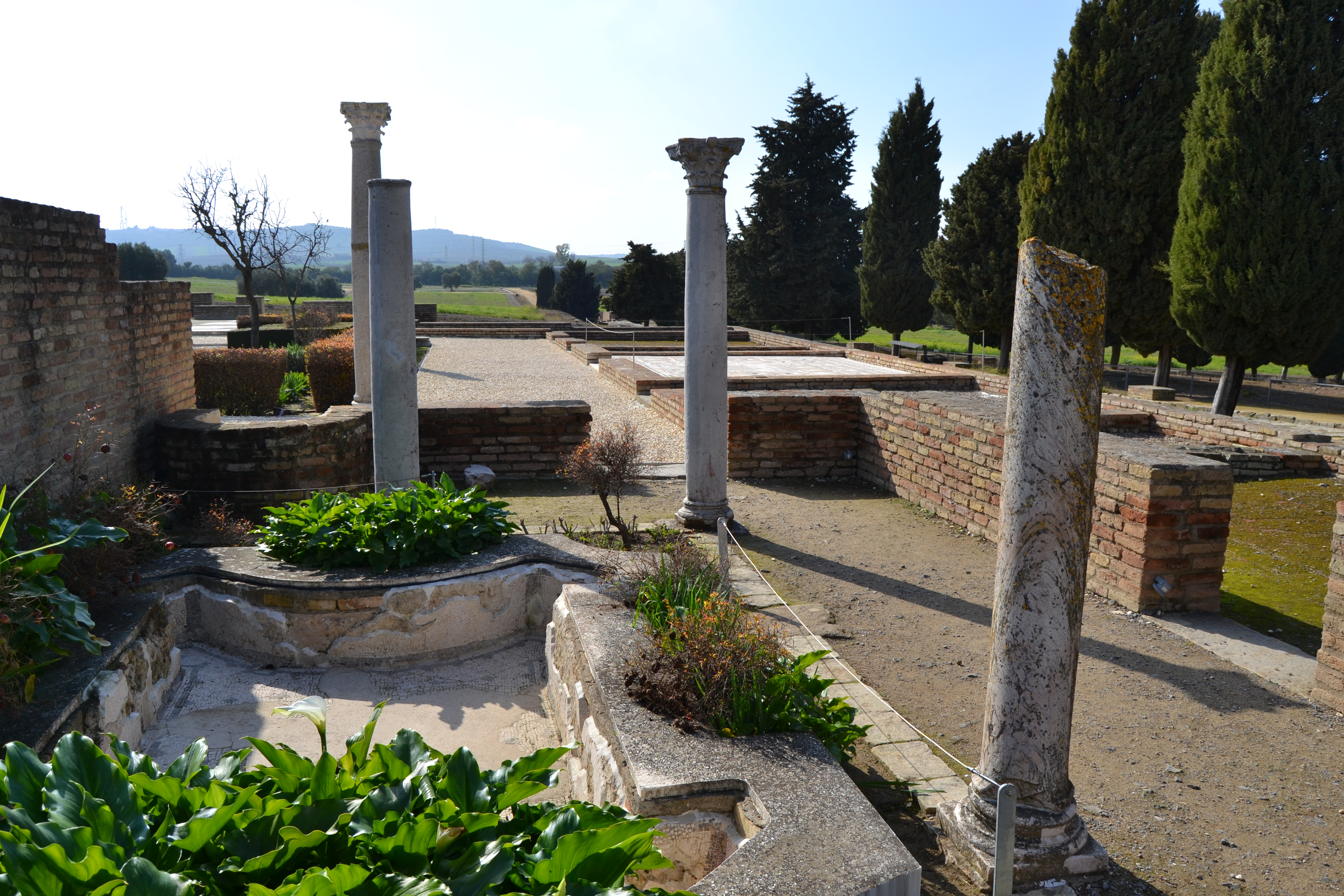
Roman columns

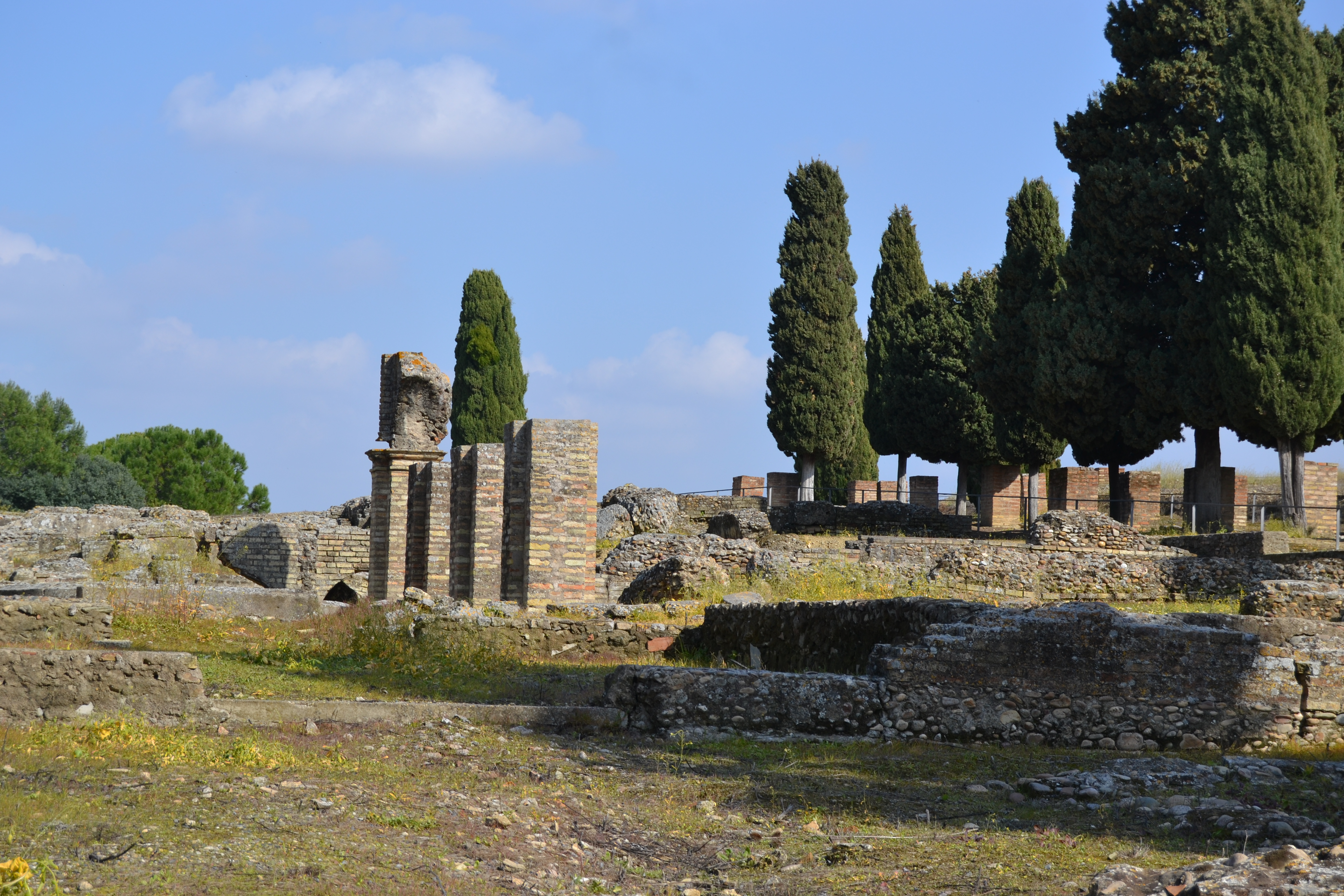
The Exedra building

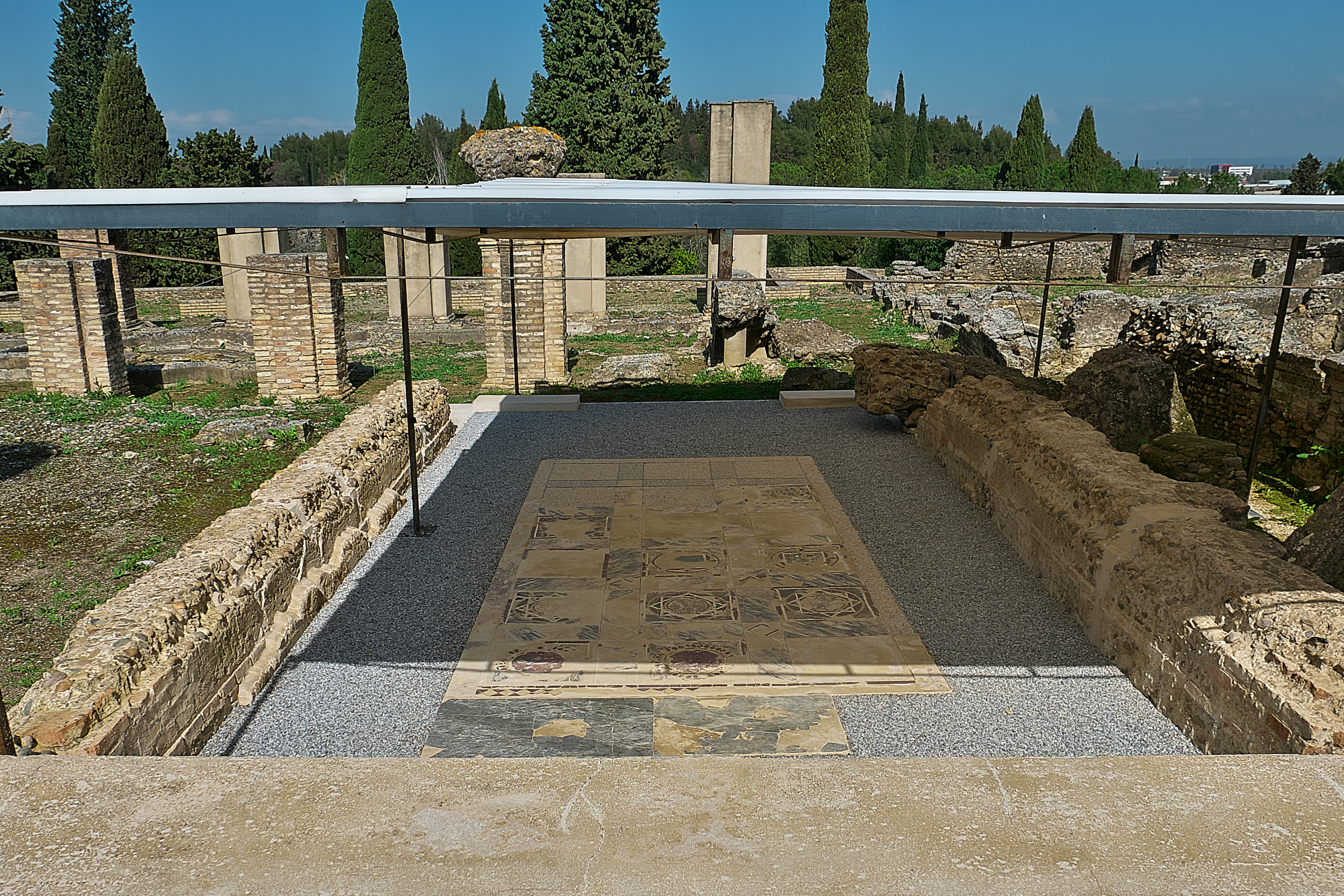
Mosaic in the Exedra

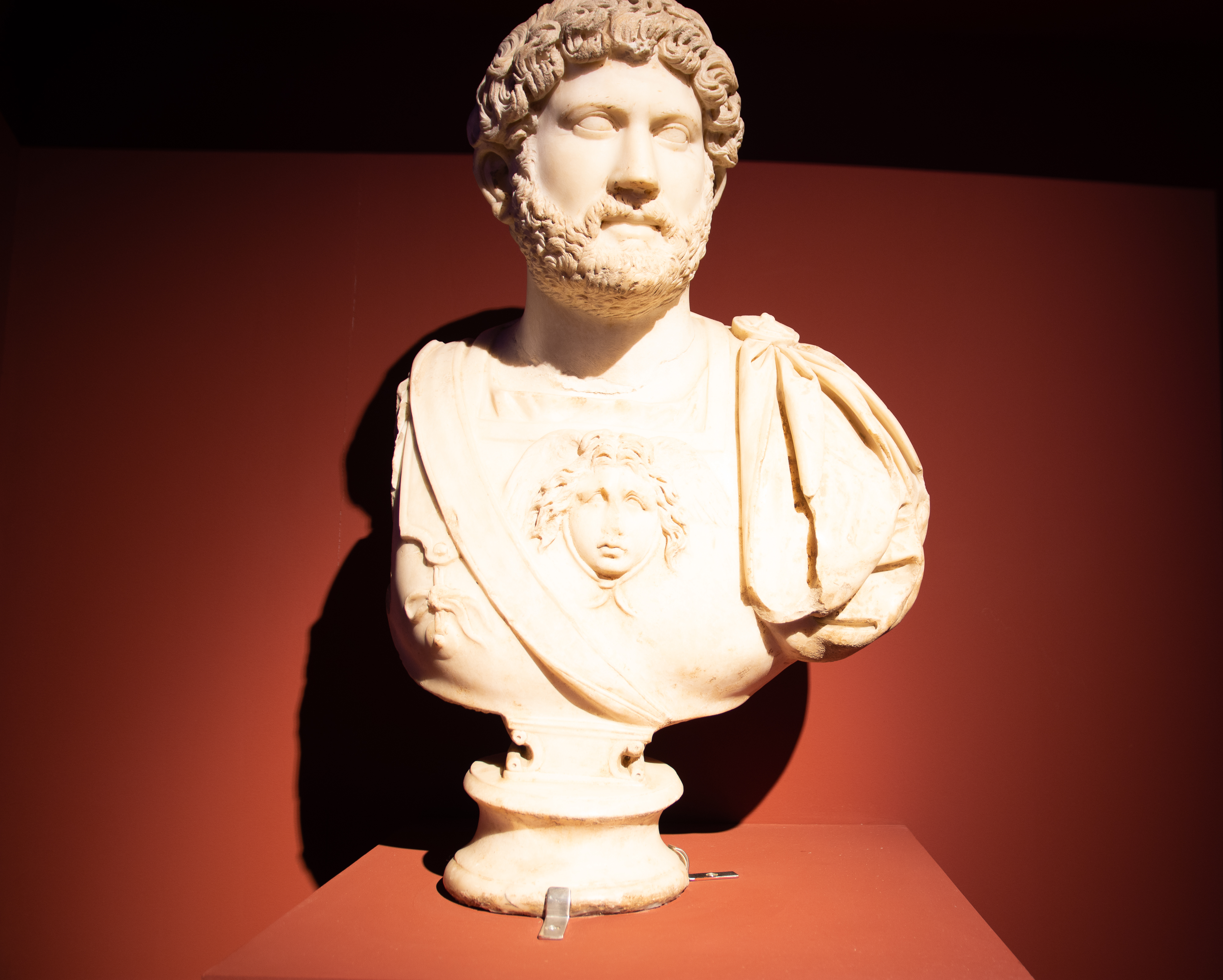
Bust of Hadrian, Italica Archeological Museum

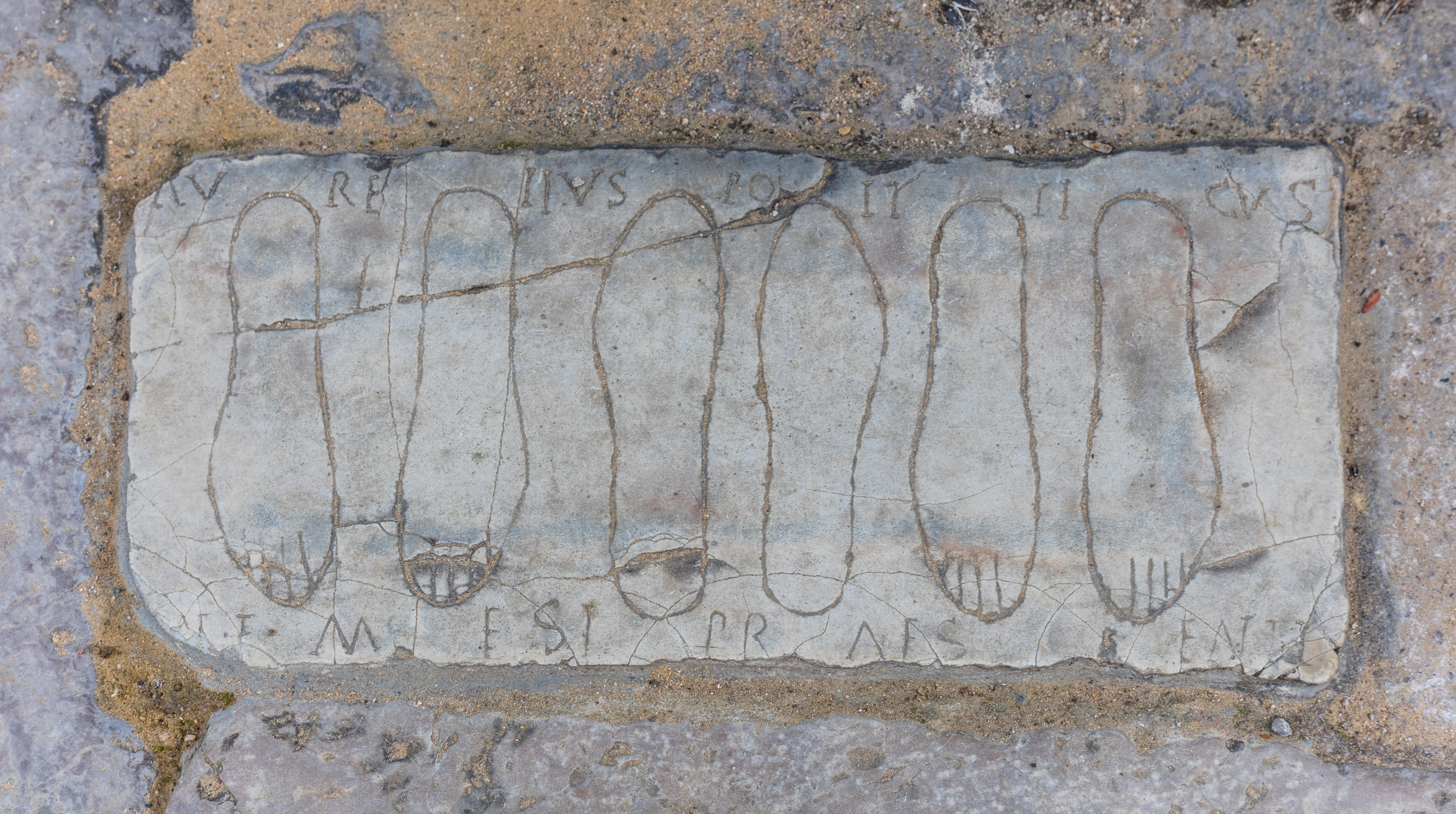
Vestigia pedis

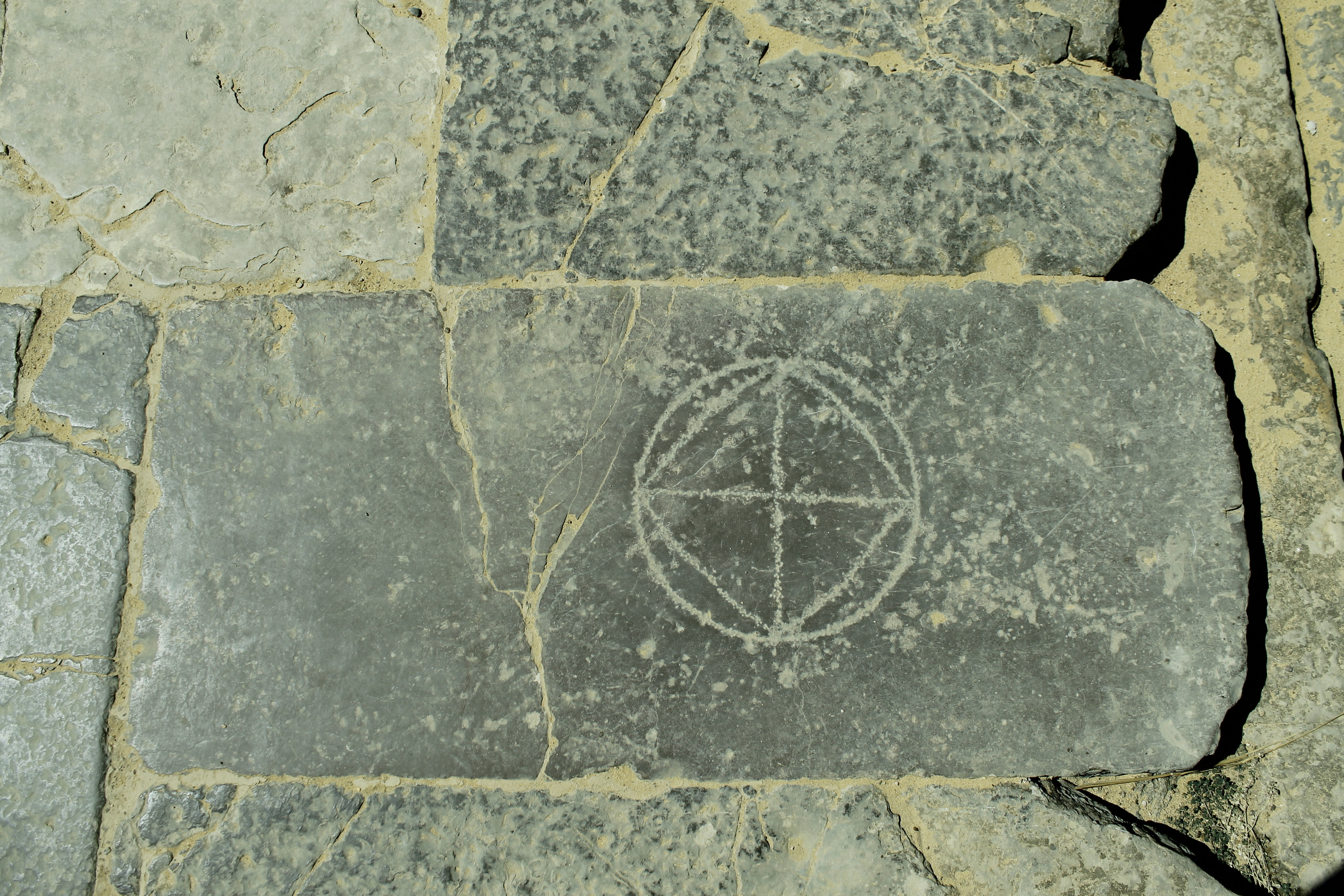
Roman board game engraved on the ground at entrance to Roman Amphitheater

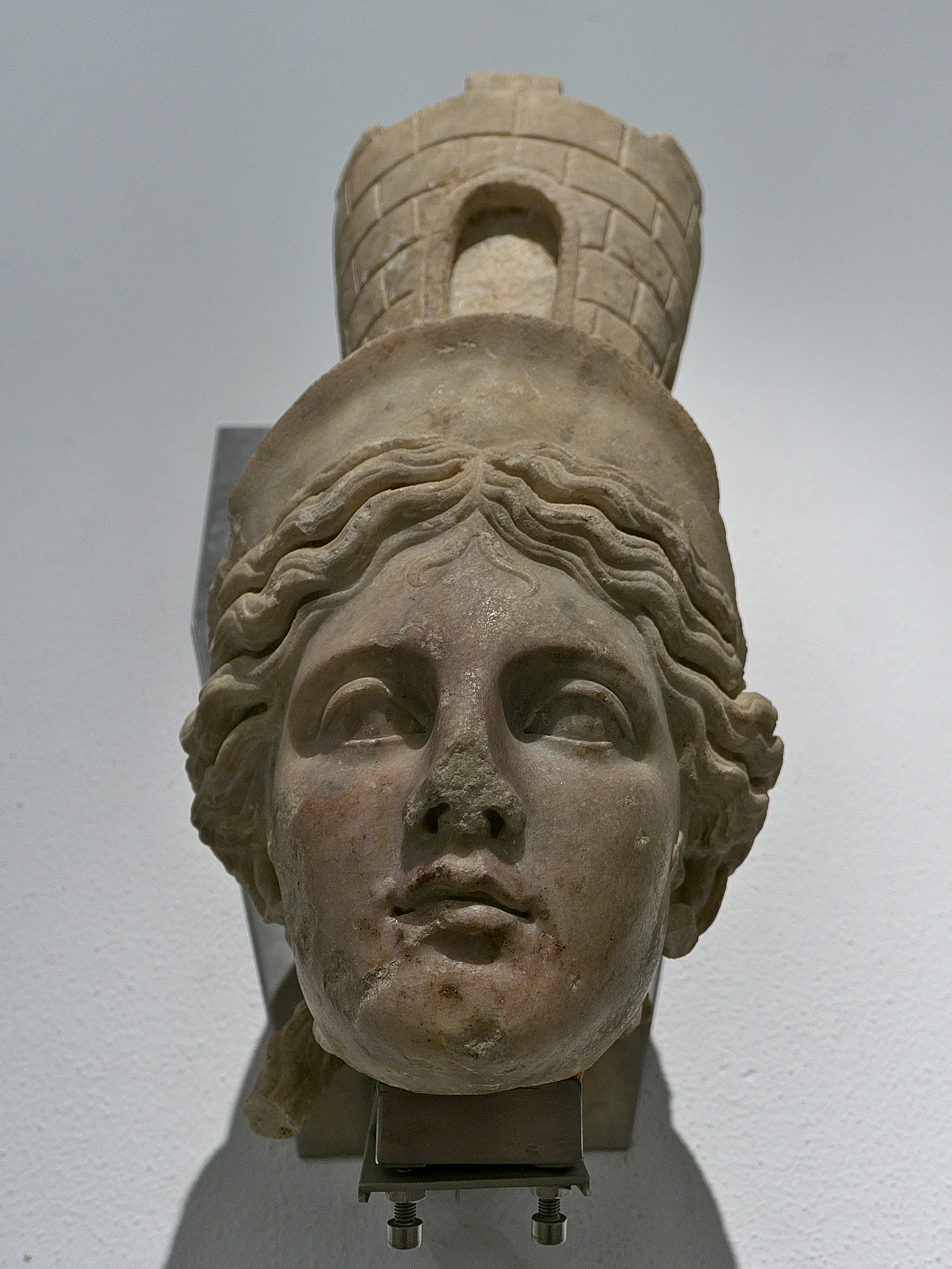
Head of the goddess Fortuna, found at Italica, Italica Archeological Museum

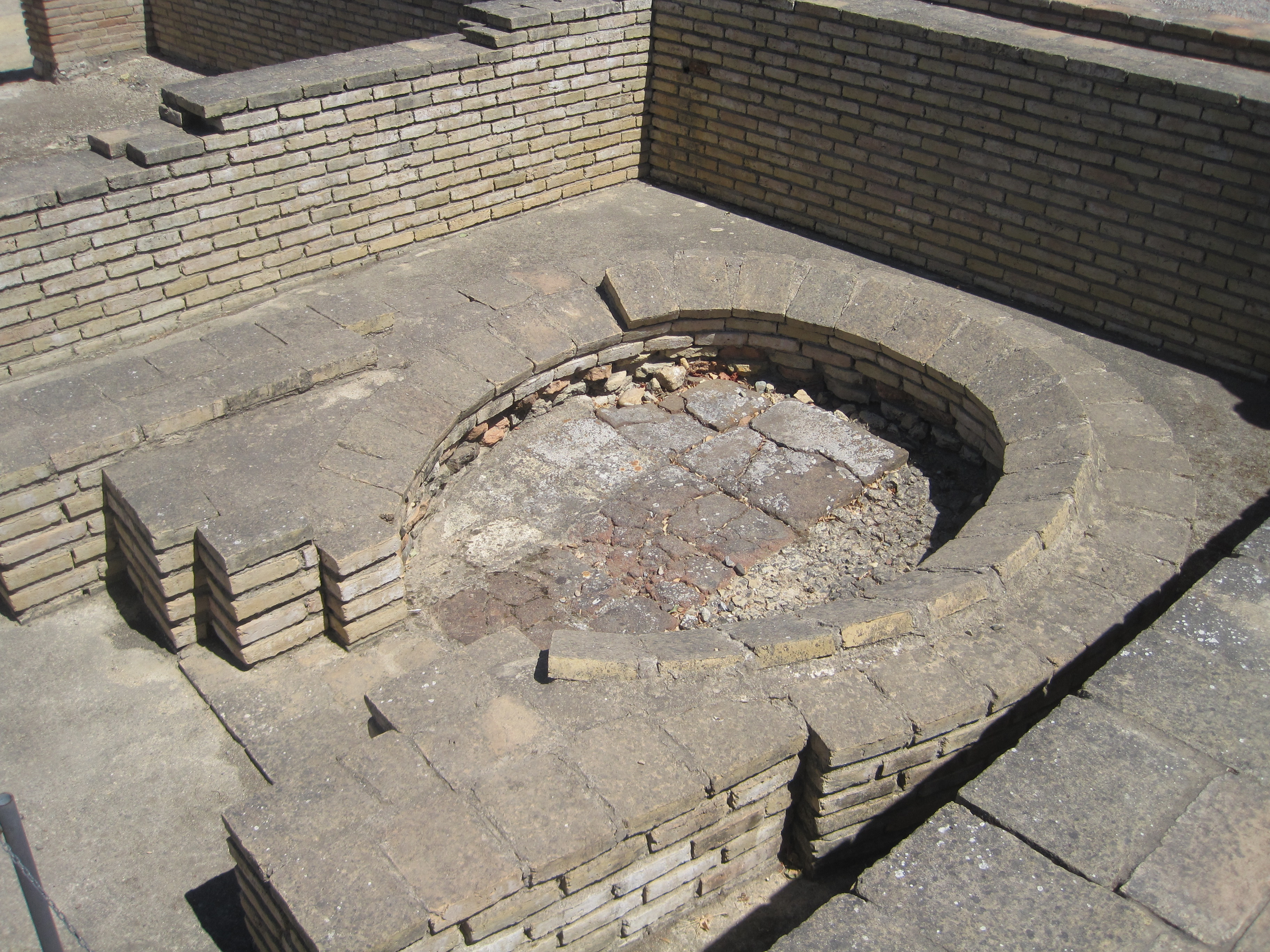
Pompeian Style Floor Oven (Panaderia)

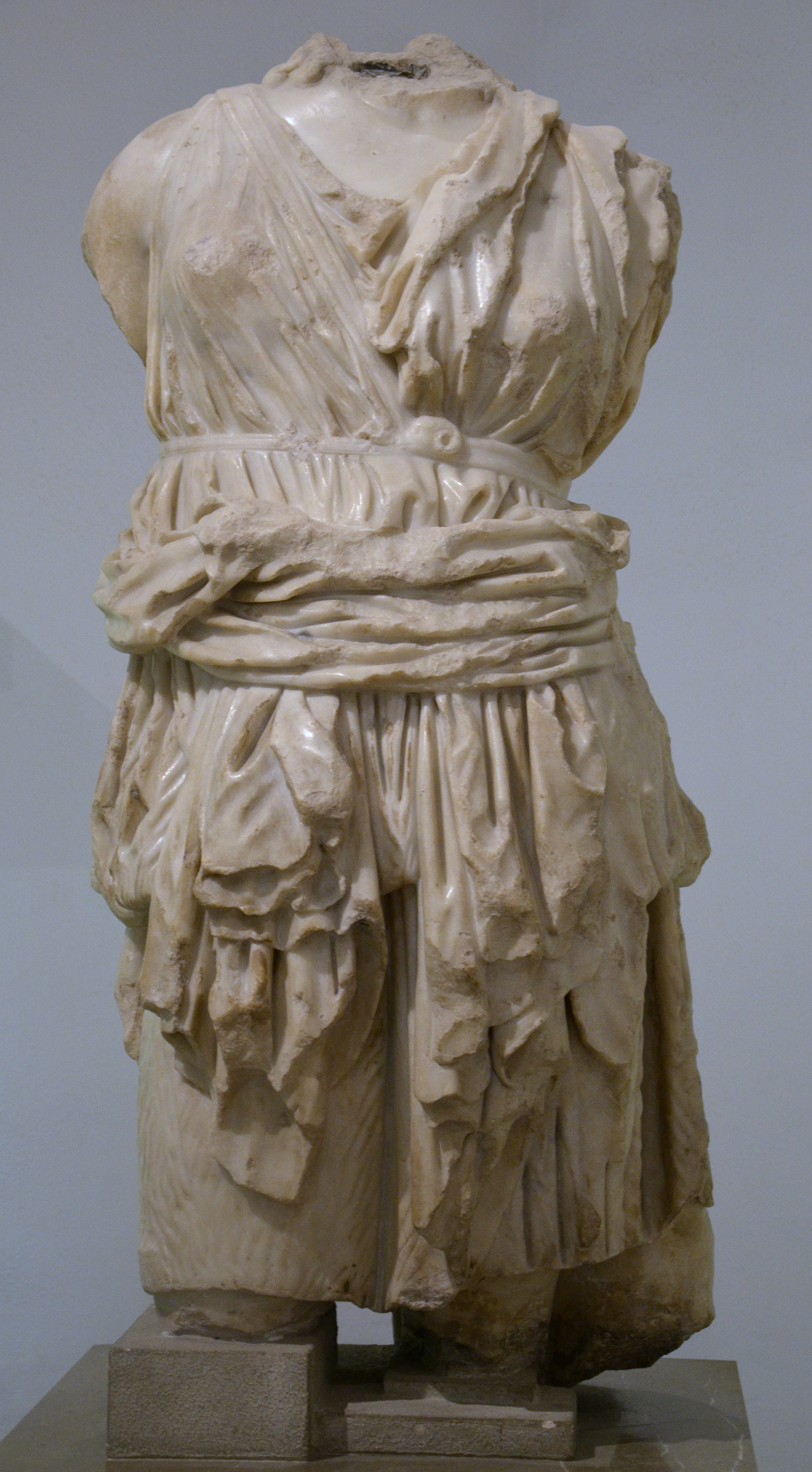
Torso of the goddess Diana found in Italica

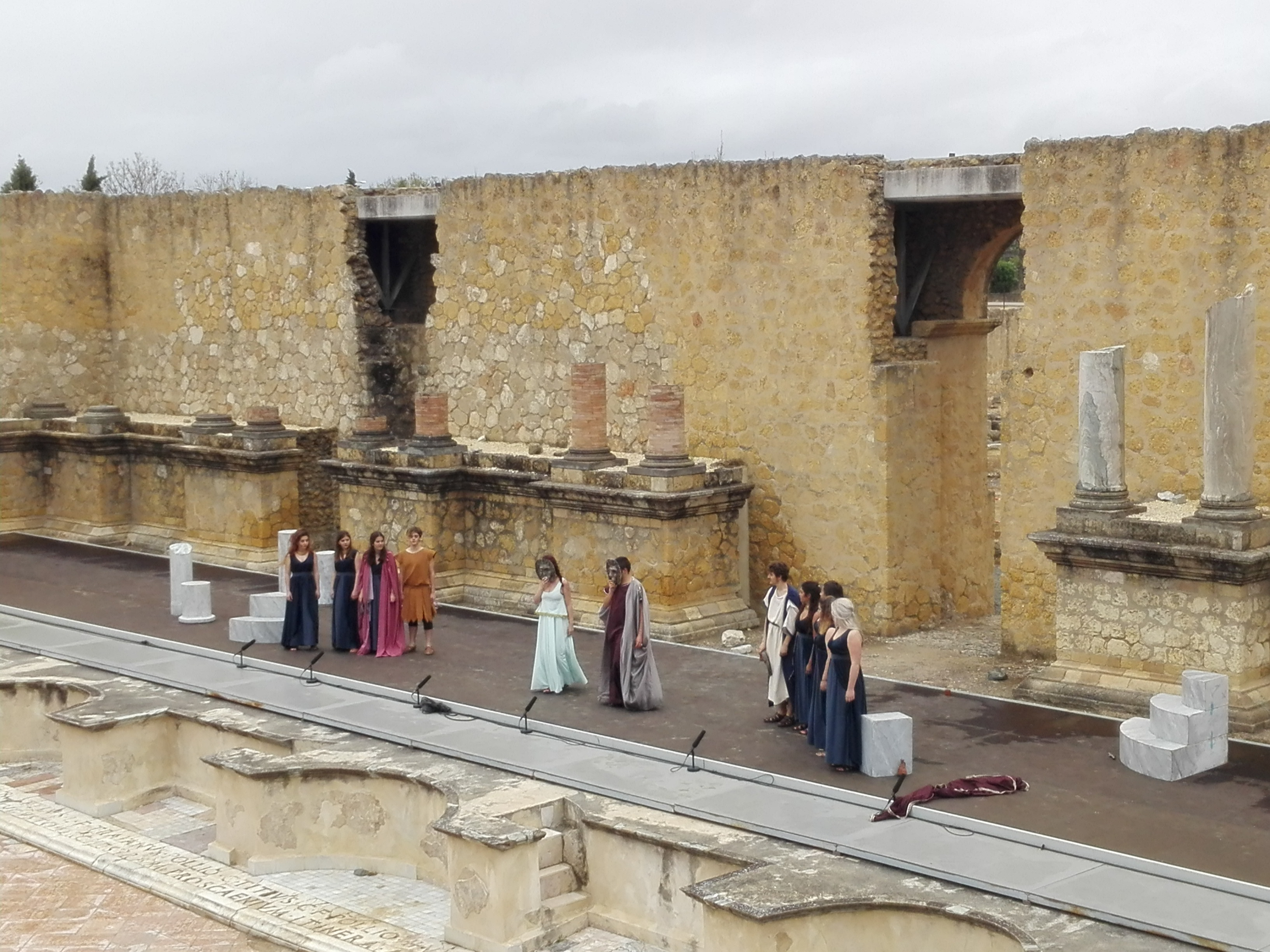
The Drama Medea, presented at the Italica Roman Theater

== See also ==
- Romanization of Hispania
