= Gallo-Roman enclosure of Le Mans =

Roman enclosure in Sarthe, France

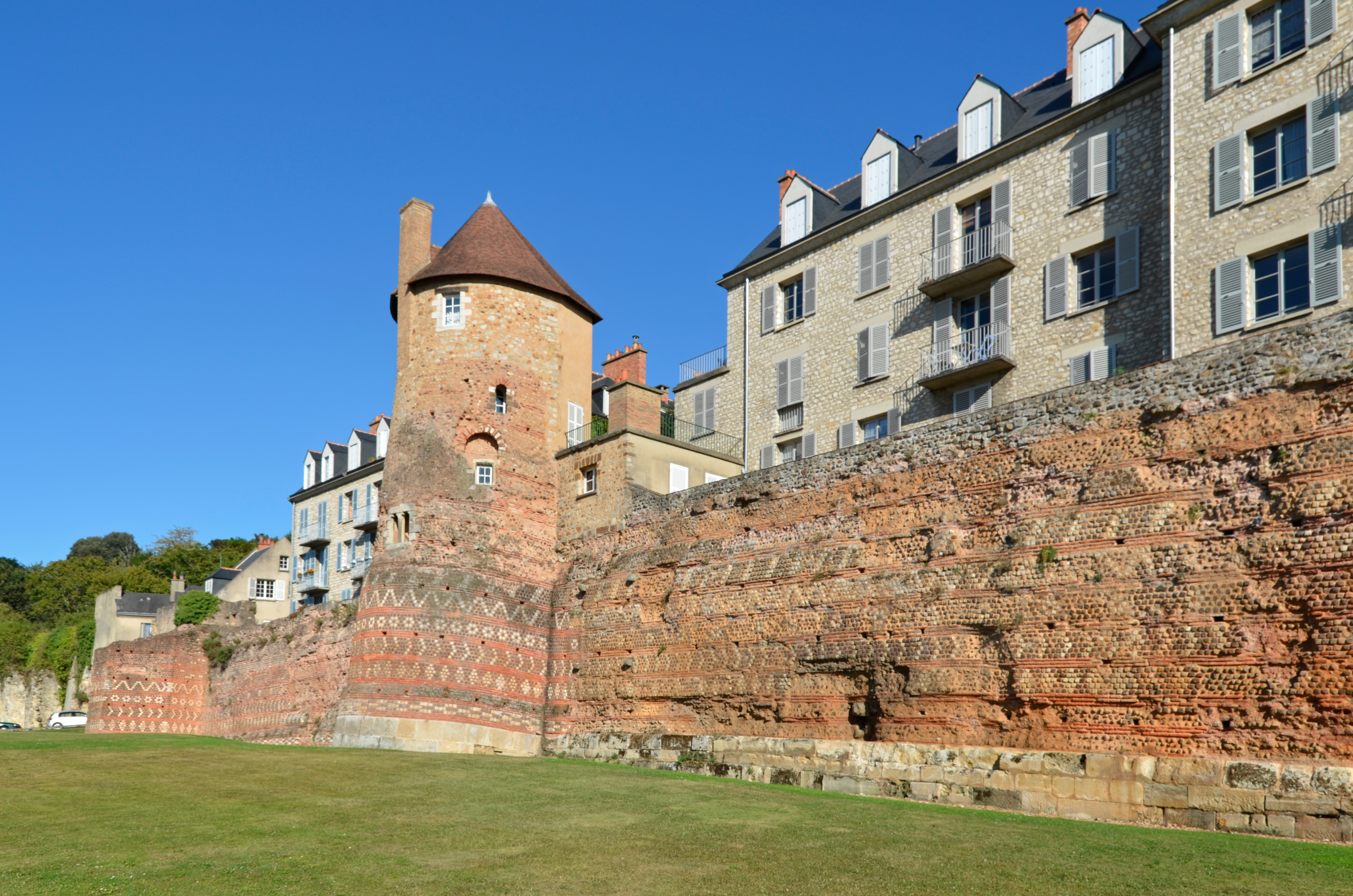
- A section of Roman wall with remains of towers.
- Interactive map of Gallo-Roman enclosure of Le Mans
- Location: Le Mans, Sarthe
- Coordinates: 48°00′35″N 0°11′48″E
- Type: Defensive wall
- Beginning date: 320
- Completion date: 360
- Classified as MH (1862)

The Gallo-Roman enclosure of Le Mans, also referred to as the Roman enclosure of Le Mans, is located in the city once known as Vindinum or Vindunum. This city was the capital of the Gallic people, the Aulerci Cenomani. The construction of the enclosure began during the Late Roman Empire. While it was previously believed to date from the end of the 3rd century, recent studies suggest a construction date at the beginning of the 4th century.

The construction work was carried out according to an organized plan and at a considerable cost, which, according to Joseph Guilleux, was indicative of the affluence of the city and its territory. The enclosure retained its military function throughout the Middle Ages and was preserved due to the rise in ground level within the enclosures, which afforded it a supporting role. Following the Middle Ages, the construction of buildings in its immediate vicinity contributed to its longevity.

Originally 1,300 meters long, the enclosure is well-preserved over approximately 500 meters. It features exquisite geometric decorations crafted with the polychrome materials used in its construction. These decorations are unique to the enclosure and are considered to be without equivalent in France, as Joseph Guilleux observed. The vibrant colors of the enclosure earned Le Mans the name "Red City."

The monument has been studied intermittently since the 16th century, with more rigorous scientific investigation beginning in the 19th century. The number of studies increased significantly from the 1980s onwards, driven by local community efforts concerned about its deterioration and potential loss. As a result of the work that has been done on the structure, it is now, according to Estelle Bertrand, among the "best-known enclosures from antiquity."

The monument has been classified as a historical monument since 1862 and has been a candidate for UNESCO World Heritage status since 2016.

== History during antiquity ==
=== General context ===
==== From origins to the crisis of the 3rd century ====
Urban enclosures serve three distinct functions: they delineate cities, defend them, and demonstrate their power. In the context of the Roman peace, few enclosures were constructed in Gaul. Security was ensured by a cohort in Lyon and legions positioned along the Rhine. The number of cities with enclosures was relatively limited, with only nineteen examples identified before the mid-3rd century. These were largely situated within the context of "symbolic remilitarization" and for prestige purposes. These structures were "public monuments with an ostentatious" and symbolic character. The majority of chief towns were not equipped with enclosures.

Following the assassination of Alexander Severus in 235, a crisis commenced that persisted until 284. This crisis encompassed political, military, and economic dimensions, as well as a period of heightened insecurity due to mounting pressures on the Empire's borders and the eruption of peasant revolts. Additionally, it was accompanied by a climatic and epidemic crisis. These crises precipitated a multitude of economic and civic transformations, leading to an overall fragility in urban life and a population decline.

Some public edifices were deemed uneconomical to maintain or were rendered superfluous as a consequence of these alterations.

==== Late Empire ====
Following the conclusion of the crisis, a comprehensive reorganization commenced and persisted under the leadership of Diocletian and Constantine. Extensive administrative, economic, and political reforms were initiated, including the division of Roman provinces to enhance administrative efficiency. This reorganization persisted until the 4th or early 5th century, according to Joseph Guilleux's analysis published in 2000.

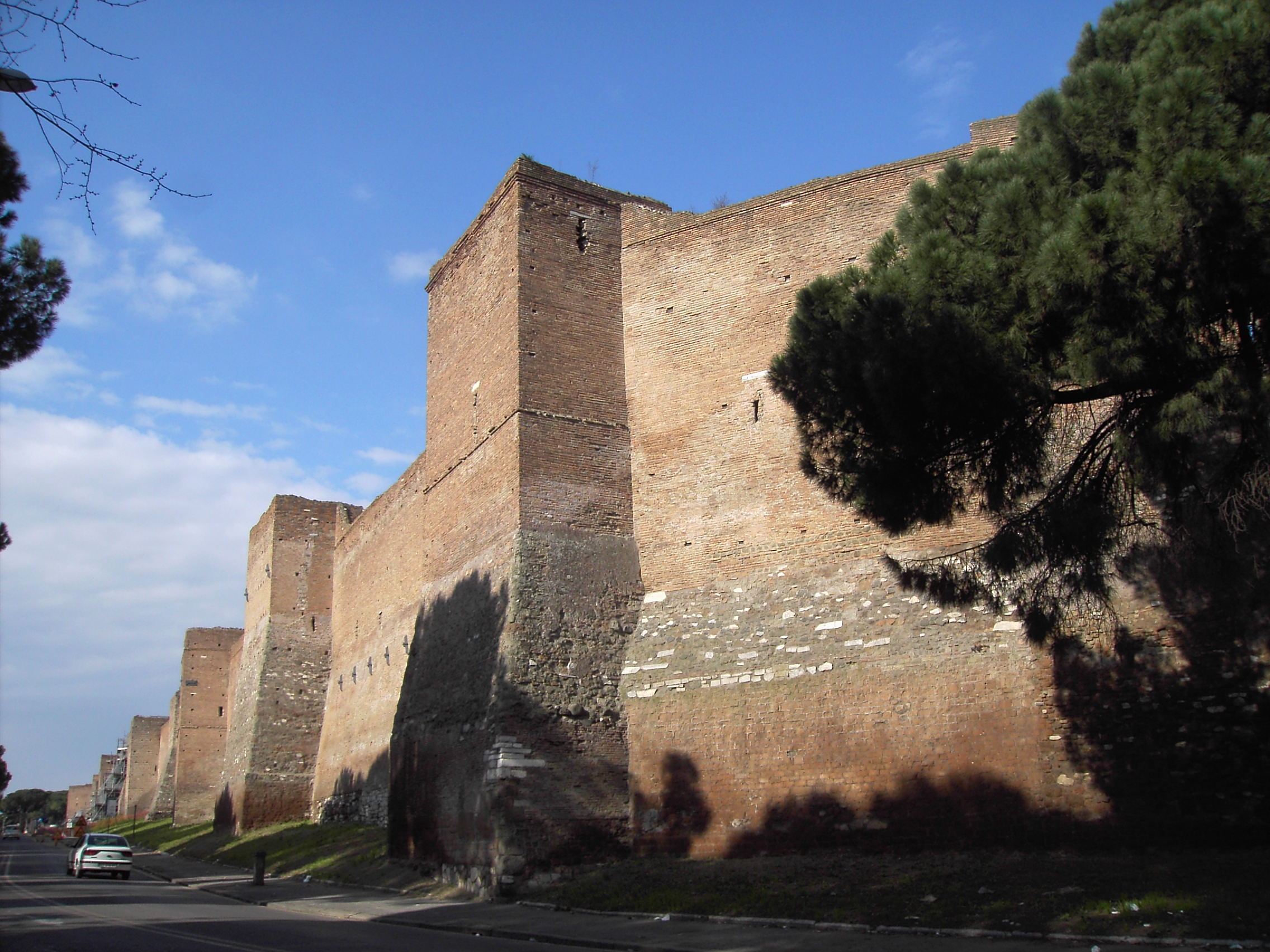
In Rome, Aurelian Wall between the San Sebastiano Gate and the Aredatina Gate.

The late enclosures were associated with a "new military, political, and administrative context", with a notable reduction in the area protected compared to the previous extent of cities. This reassertion of control was exemplified in Rome by the construction of the Aurelian Wall, which spanned 19 km. Civitas capitals were equipped with them, as well as other sites that assumed new administrative or strategic roles. The movement commenced in the last quarter of the 3rd century.

The Roman military system was subsequently reinforced, a system of fortified cities was established within the Empire, and this constituted "the most remarkable element of this system." The Rhine and Danube borders underwent significant reorganization, and the chief towns of cities were equipped with enclosures, which symbolized the "restored order and renewed power of Rome." (Note: Chevet, Meunier & Monteil 2022, p. 188)

The construction of enclosures, which exhibited considerable variation in terms of the areas they encompassed and the nature of the structures erected, continued until the fifth century. By the midway point of the fifth century, the majority of capitals and secondary towns had enclosures. These constructions, which were likely undertaken with the Emperor's authorization, incorporated elements from High Empire structures and served as a symbol of prestige, even though the enclosed areas were smaller than the territories encompassed by the towns.

During the 4th and 5th centuries, there were periods of both turmoil and relative calm. At the beginning of the 5th century, the era of "real invasions" began.

=== Local context ===
==== Vindunum and history until the High Empire ====
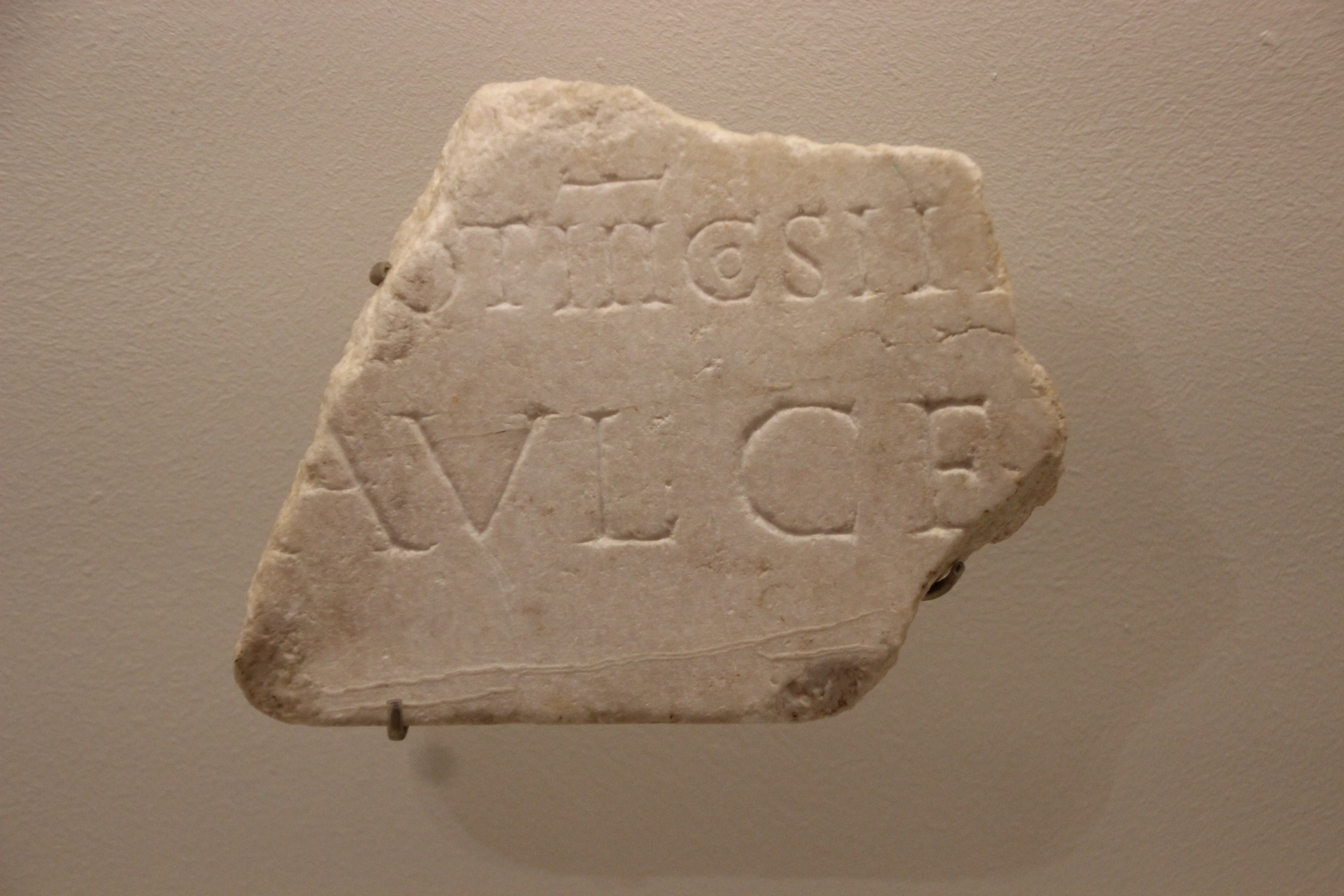
Fragment of an inscription dating from the 2nd–3rd centuries, with a mention of the Aulerques Cénomans people.

The city developed on the plateau of Sargé, situated between the Sarthe River and one of its tributaries, the Isaac. (Note: Chevet, Meunier & Monteil 2022, p. 168) The topography is characterized by a steep gradient towards the Sarthe River, which gradually becomes gentler in the opposite direction. On the Sarthe side, the site of the current enclosure was protected from flooding, despite the absence of river dikes. This was due to the fact that the Sarthe River could serve as a natural defence against potential enemies and as an economic asset.

The site of Le Mans was occupied between the 8th century BC and the 5th century BC. As early as Ptolemy (Geography, II, 8), the place was known as the capital of the Aulerci Cenomani. However, the presence of an oppidum on the site remains uncertain, despite the discovery in 2010 of a mid-1st century BC occupation interpreted as a water sanctuary, a "small isolated complex." (Note: Chevet, Meunier & Monteil 2022, pp. 171–174)

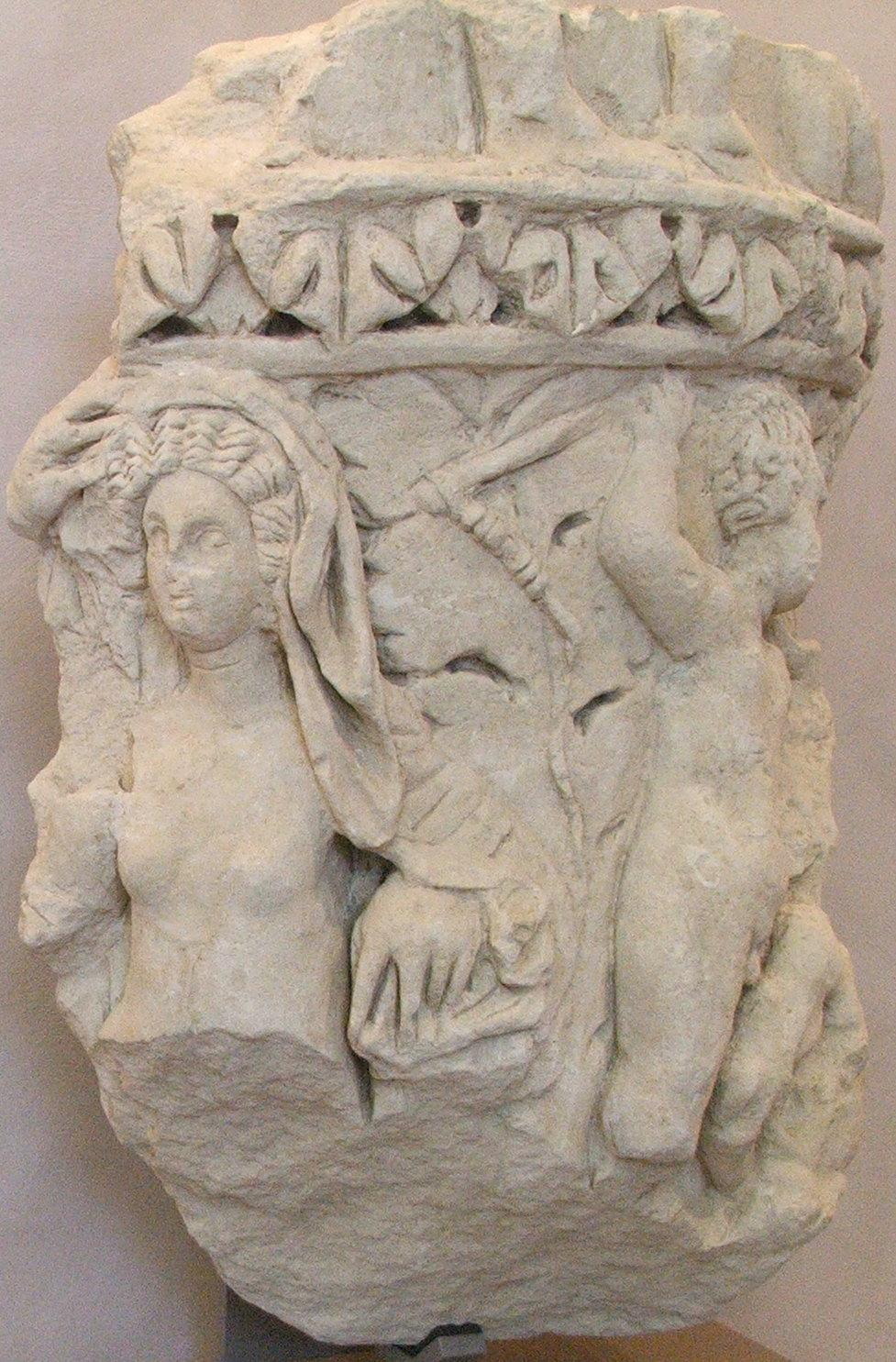
Column drum from the Temple of Mars Mullo in the Museum of archaeology and history of Le Mans.

After the Roman conquest, the city was incorporated into the newly established Augustan organization of Gallia Lugdunensis. The available evidence suggests that knowledge of the High Empire city is "delicate." (Note: Chevet, Meunier & Monteil 2022, p. 171) The town is believed to have taken shape at the beginning of the Common Era. By 50 AD, the town occupied approximately 30 hectares, while by the end of the 1st century and the beginning of the 2nd century, this had increased to approximately 40 hectares. (Note: Chevet, Meunier & Monteil 2022, p. 174) The site was modified by the installation of terraces, which were constructed to facilitate urbanization.

The period of greatest urban vitality for the city was from the Flavian dynasty to the 3rd century. The ongoing Romanization resulted in a transformation of lifestyle and urban display during the 1st and 2nd centuries. Some inhabitants were granted Roman citizenship as early as the mid-1st century. The city acquired institutions based on the Roman system, and a monumental temple dedicated to Mars Mullo, which was already present in Allonnes, was constructed at the end of the 1st century. The city then had monumental decorations intended to mark its political, religious, and leisure role; furthermore, it may have been equipped with a river port.

The city's area was estimated to be between 70 and 80 hectares by Joseph Guilleux in the 2nd century. However, recent syntheses have proposed a more modest figure of approximately 60 hectares, dating to around 200.

==== Contraction of the city and history in the Late Empire ====
===== Crisis =====
Map of the Roman Empire in 271.

In the 3rd century, the city underwent a name change, becoming known as Civitas Cenomannorum. During the period of turmoil that followed the Gallic Empire's establishment in 260 CE, the city was incorporated into the empire.

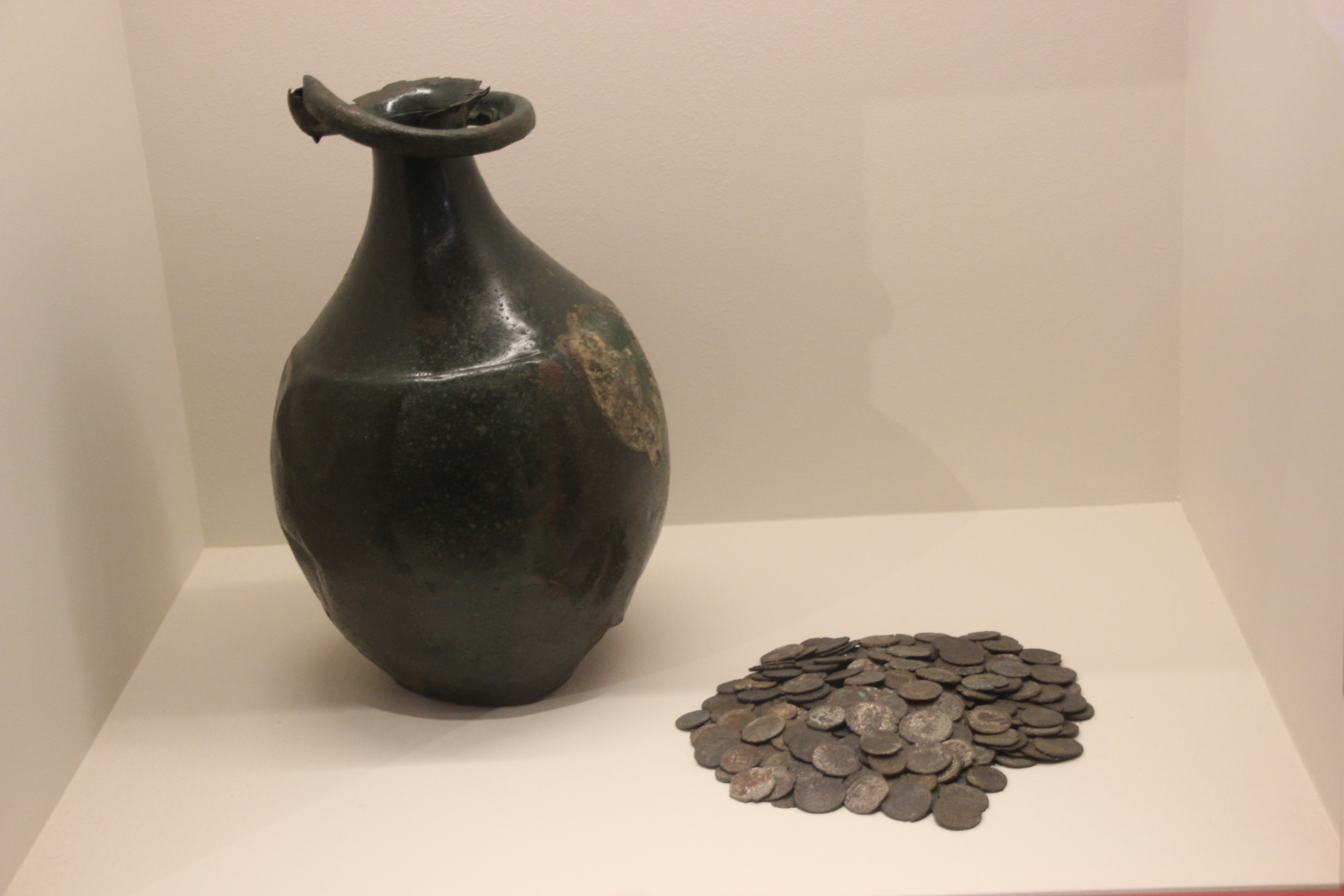
Presentation of a jug and coins from the Allonnes Treasure, dated 275.

The expansion of the city ceased at the beginning of the third century. The area was 45 hectares in the mid-3rd century, and it still encompassed approximately thirty hectares at the end of the century. The city exhibited a pattern of alternating abandoned sectors with other still-occupied sites, such as the entertainment building or a tavern. The period between 270 and 280 saw a notable decline in the extent of inhabited areas, except for those situated in proximity to the Sarthe. This period also marked the cessation of craft activities. Unoccupied areas were either in a state of disrepair or returned to agricultural use.

===== Construction of the enclosure =====
The construction of the Roman enclosure of Le Mans was a strategic necessity for the protection of the city. The question of the military role of the city and the enclosure, whether they constituted "part of a larger system" or an autonomous system, remains unresolved. The enclosure of Le Mans is part of a group of structures intended to protect roadways. (Note: Guilleux 2000, p. 260) It is possible that a garrison was present. (Note: Guilleux 2000, p. 262) The structure also aimed to affirm the city's power and wealth.

The enclosure has been long dated to the reign of Diocletian, between 270 and 310. Joseph Guilleux's thesis proposed a date of approximately 285 based on the results of archaeometric analyses of bricks that have been re-examined. The most recent estimates from Inrap, from 2018 to 2019, suggest a date range of 320 to 360 for the entire structure, with the eastern part dating to within this range.

The decision to construct the enclosure is thought to have been made at the end of the 3rd century and the beginning of the 4th century. However, the evidence available does not allow us to determine with certainty the circumstances surrounding the preparation phase. (Note: Guilleux 2000, p. 119) The archaeological data suggest that the enclosure was built to a high standard and that the planning and execution of the work were carried out methodically and thoroughly, without undue haste.

This decision was made by the local authorities with the agreement of the imperial authority. The enclosure also serves to mark the restoration of the Empire after a period of turmoil, during which it was necessary to mobilize labor and financial resources. These may have been derived from local euergetism and a special tax or imperial exemption, or even from the reallocation of taxes and levies. Euergetism had not been practiced in the Gaulish territories since the 3rd century.

As Joseph Guilleux has observed, the enclosure allowed the city to maintain its "tradition of domination" over a territory. The construction represented an opportunity to reaffirm the status of the capital and the position of the local elites.

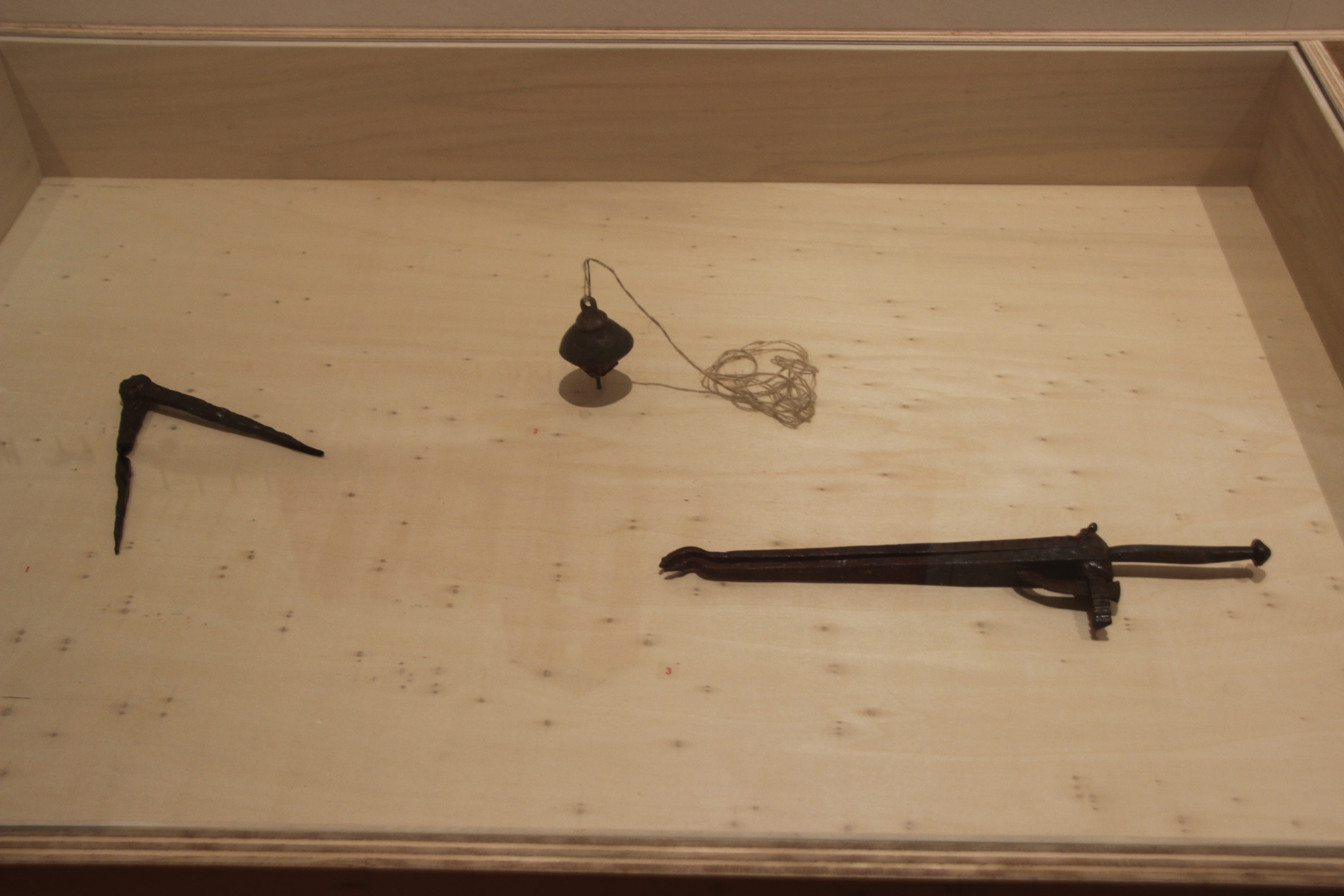
Presentation of three tools, including a compass, used to build the enclosure, on display at the Le Mans archaeological museum in 2022–2023.

The plan was drafted by an architect or engineer, a "specialist in military architecture", who was either a member of the army or an imperial official. It included the requisite gates and posterns and considered the existing road network, as well as the necessities for amenities such as sewage and rainwater systems. The civic center was probably incorporated into the enclosure. (Note: Guilleux 2000, p. 259)

The construction project spanned a minimum of three to five years and employed at least 200 masons. It is reasonable to conclude that the project could have taken up to twenty-five to thirty years if fewer workers were employed. Joseph Guilleux estimated that the construction took approximately ten years. For comparison, the Aurelian Walls in Rome were built in five to ten years. The project had a significant impact on the local economy, mobilizing a diverse range of trades. The workforce likely included both soldiers and locals subjected to forced labor.

Some neighborhoods of the city, as well as public and private buildings, were razed to facilitate the construction and implementation of the project. The clearances, estimated to encompass between 4 and 13 hectares, may have spanned "several tens of meters."

===== Urban transformations and the end of the Empire =====
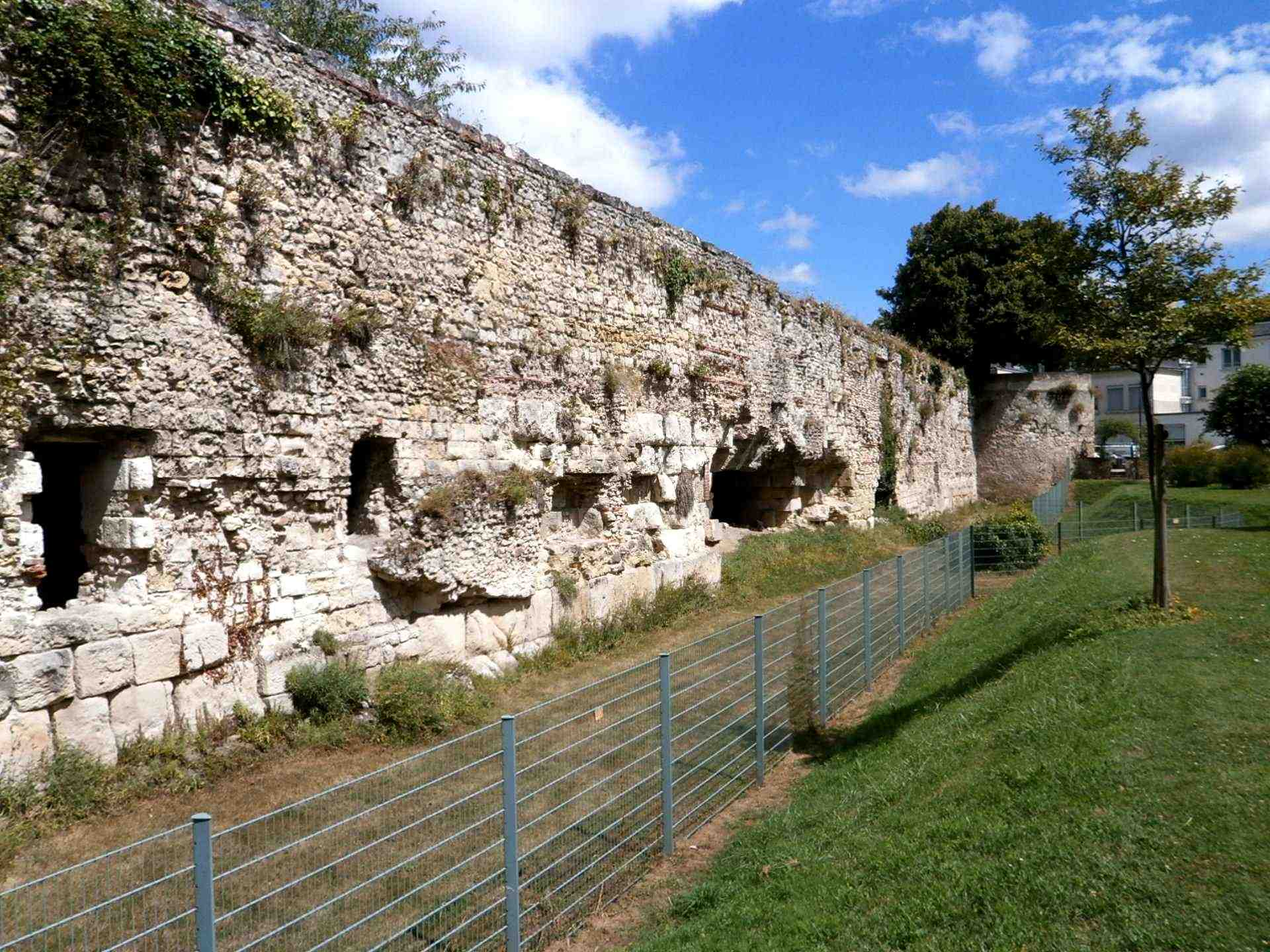
Southeast corner of Tours' Roman enclosure and the "Petit Cupidon" tower.

The enclosure encompasses an area of 8.5 hectares, with the city reaching a maximum of 10 hectares in the 4th century. This is comparable to other newly fortified towns such as Angers and Tours, the provincial capital (9 hectares). Consequently, the majority of the city from the 4th and 5th centuries was thus protected. However, not all of the city was included. The enclosure excluded the baths known as the Claude-Chappe School, which were repurposed as housing despite partial destruction, as well as a monumental fountain. Additionally, the road network was simplified.

The interior of the city is poorly known archaeologically due to its status as a protected sector since 1966, as is the history of the neighborhoods outside the enclosure. (Note: Chevet, Meunier & Monteil 2022, pp. 197–198) There have been few archaeological investigations, although some 19th-century excavation results have been reexamined. Researchers have suggested that the road network likely persisted into the medieval period. The street layout suggests a regular urban plan, perhaps inherited from the High Empire.

Archaeological evidence suggests that private spaces were established within former buildings, with new constructions comprising earth, wood, and other organic materials. Inhumation became the predominant burial practice, while cremation was largely abandoned. Cemetery locations remained outside the city from the 3rd to the 6th century, or even until the 10th century. Small cemeteries were designated for modest populations, while a larger necropolis was located on the right bank of the Sarthe.

The construction of the enclosure involved the use of materials from some public monuments located outside the enclosure. There is a paucity of residual occupation sites that have been identified, except for a domus in the Place des Halles area, which was occupied until the mid-4th century. (Note: Chevet, Meunier & Monteil 2022, p. 176) The banks of the Sarthe were home to a variety of artisanal and commercial activities.

The forum was possibly maintained until the late 4th or early 5th century, with the curia facilitating administrative and economic life. Civic and public sanctuaries were abandoned from the late 3rd century onwards, and the sanctuary of Mars Mullo was closed around 330–340.

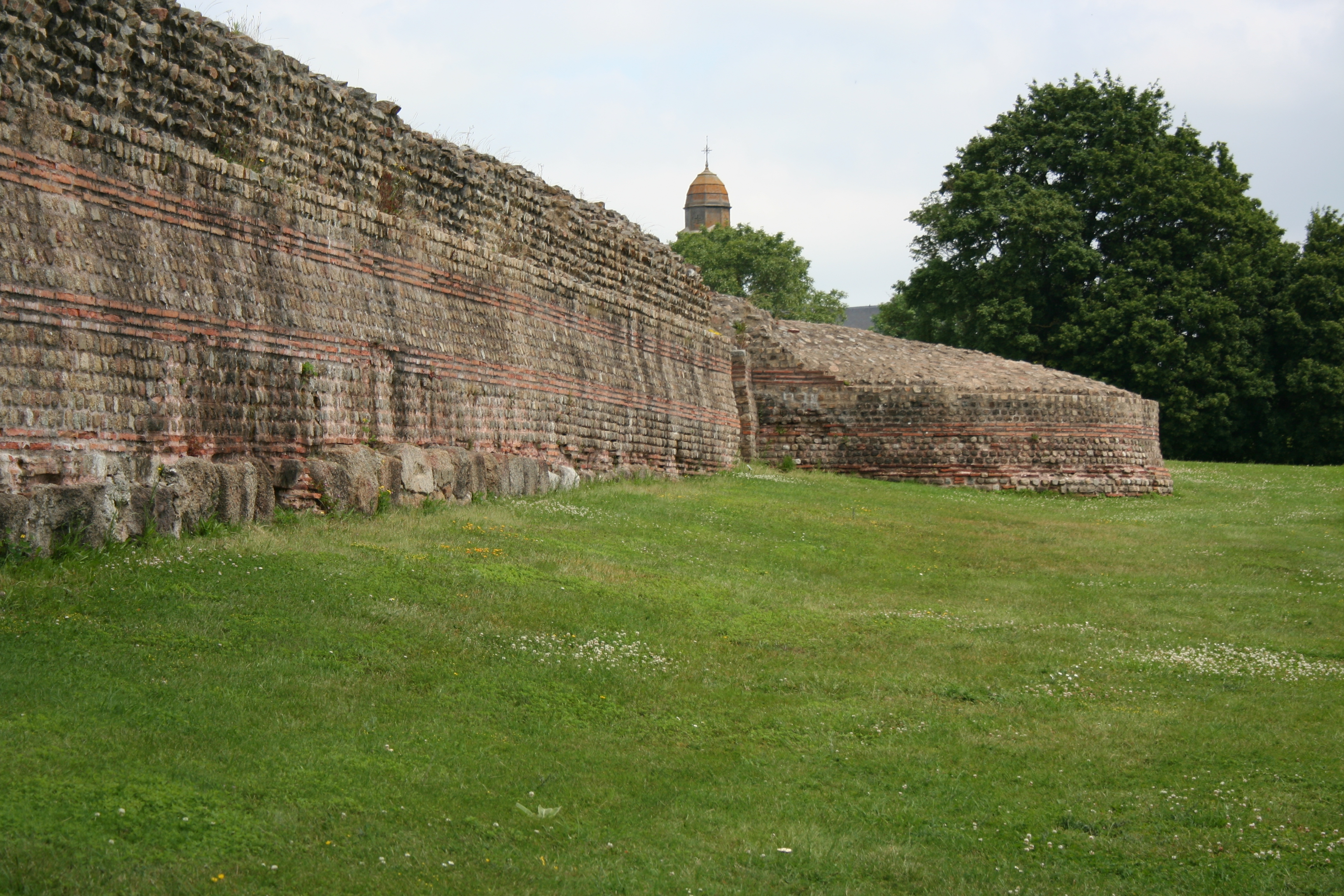
Outer wall of the Jublains fortress.

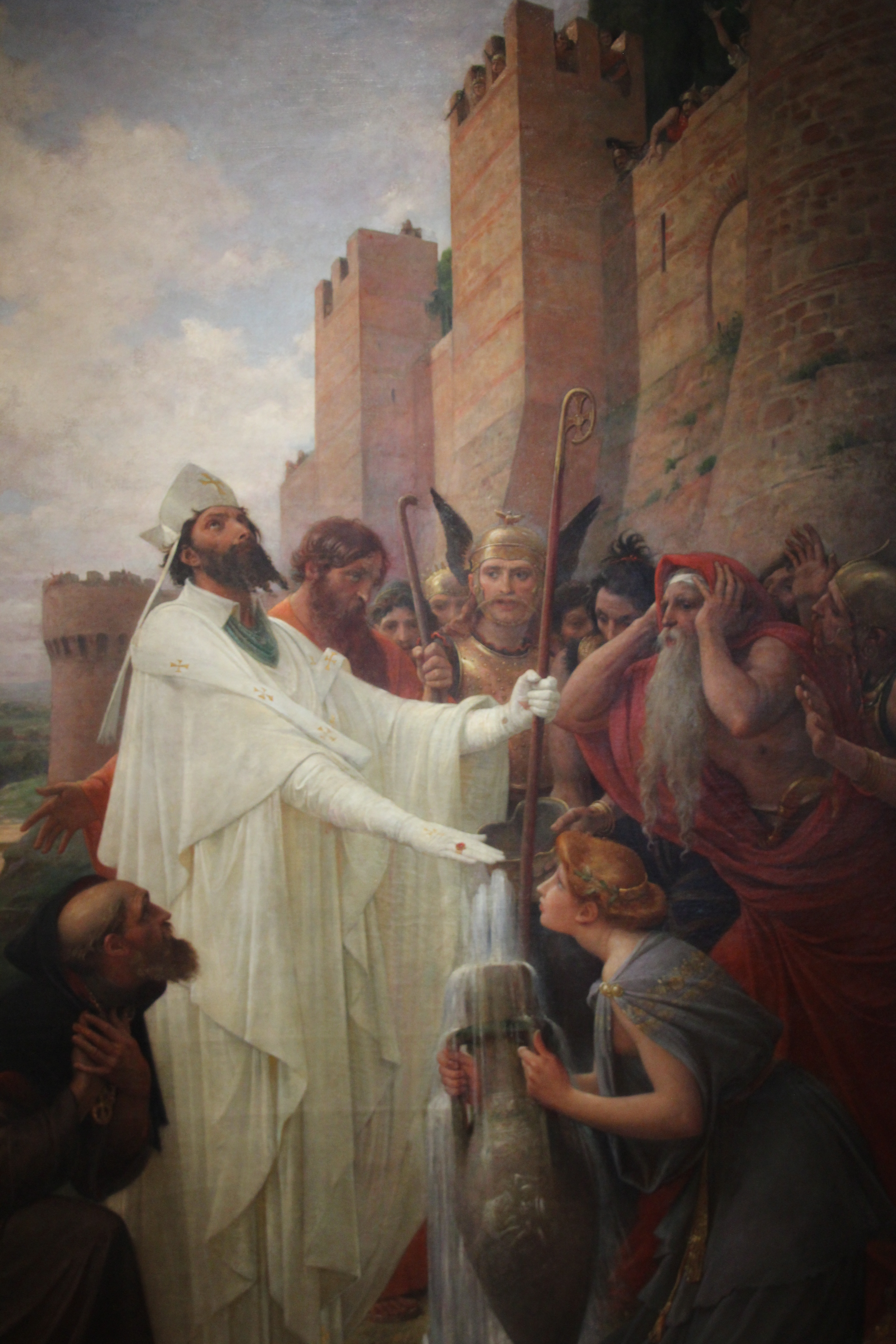
Saint Julien faisant jaillir la fontaine, painting by Lionel Royer, presented in the exhibition Au pied du mur. The bishop of Le Mans is in the foreground. Note the representation of a wall in the background, probably intended to represent the ancient city.

In the fourth century, under the reign of Constantine, the city of Le Mans was attached to the province of Lyonnaise Seconda and subsequently to Lyonnaise Tertia. During the first half of the fifth century, the territory of the Aulerci Diablintes came under the control of Le Mans, resulting in Jublains losing its status as a capital.

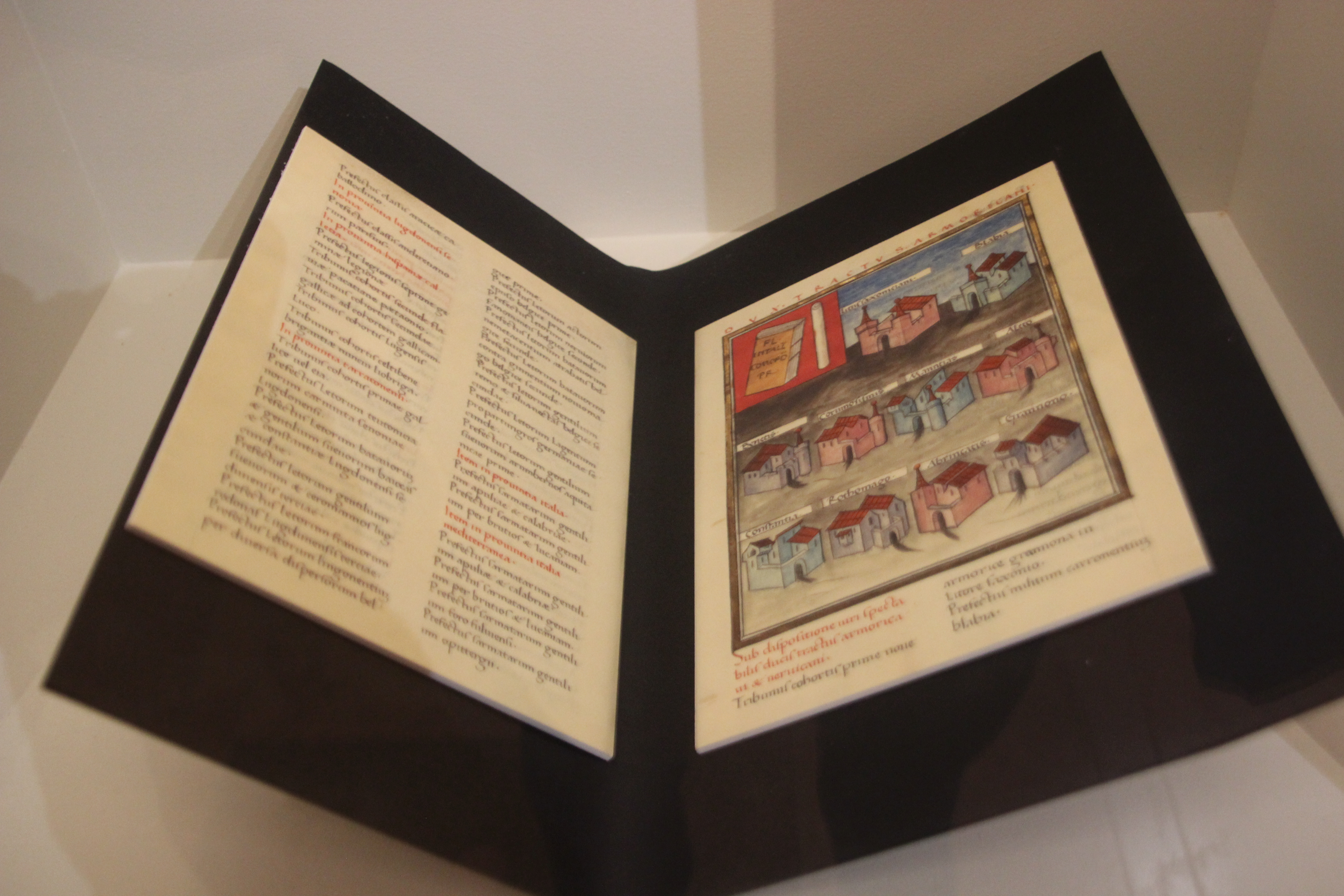
Facsimile of the Notitia Dignitatum exhibited at the Musée archéologique du Mans during the Au pied du mur exhibition.

The Notitia Dignitatum, a document dating from the late 4th to early 5th century, refers to a prefect responsible for the "Lètes gentiles Suèves." Some scholars posit that the population in the 4th and early 5th centuries comprised civilians and military personnel tasked with maintaining security and ensuring the collection of taxes. Conversely, other scholars contend that the military presence was sporadic, contingent upon specific operations.

It seems probable that the city was occupied by an episcopal group during the second half of the 5th century, during the episcopate of Victeur. This may have been at the site of the cathedral and against the enclosure, due to a "lack of available space elsewhere." The bishop succeeded the emperor's representatives. However, there is no evidence that the defensive role of Le Mans' enclosure was proven in the context of the 5th-century invasions. By the end of the century, the city had become part of the Frankish kingdom.

The enclosure had a profound and enduring impact on the city, shaping its development for centuries. It serves as a testament to the city's evolution at the end of Antiquity, exemplifying the transition from the term civitas, which originally described the territory, to its later denotation as the enclosed city.

== Description ==
Plan of the Gallo-Roman enclosure: observed section attested section restored section restitution J. Guilleux

=== General description ===
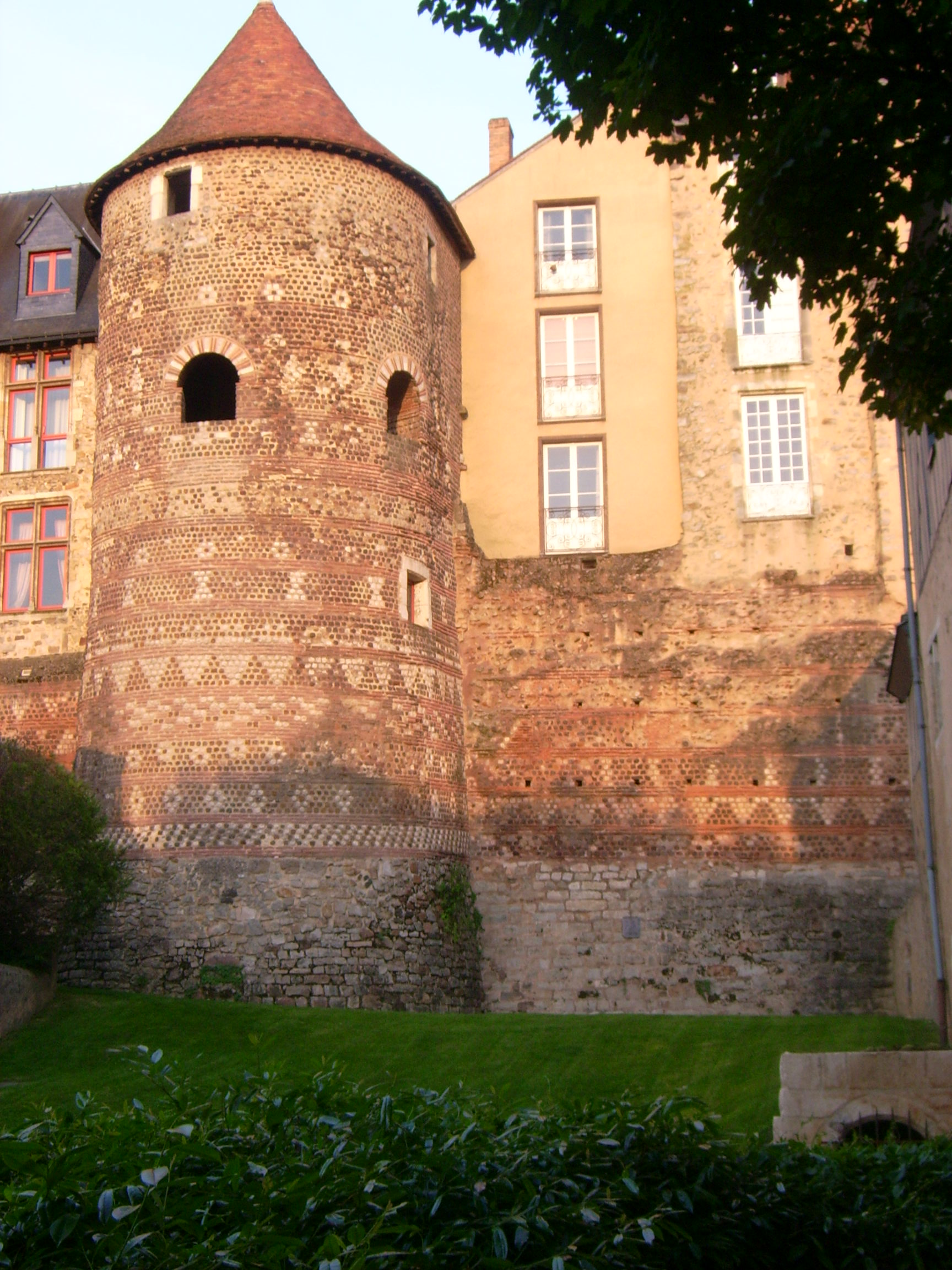
Detail of the enclosure with the Tour du Vivier.

The enclosure of Le Mans encompasses the majority of the city during the Late Antiquity period. Its elevated position reflects its strategic military importance, while also incorporating the High Empire forum. It originally formed an approximate rectangle measuring 450 meters by 200 meters along the Sarthe River. The length is noted elsewhere as 490 meters, with a width of 185 meters to the north and 115 meters to the south.

The enclosure is characterized by two long sides and two short sides, which deviate from strict straightness and complete parallelism due to the adaptation to the terrain and the edge of the plateau. The northeastern side of the enclosure is the most vulnerable due to its proximity to the plateau. The enclosure is oriented southwest-northeast. The southeastern side narrows due to the site's topography and the presence of the public complex, which may be the forum. The southern side is "partly uncertain" due to the observations made by Joseph Guilleux in 2000.

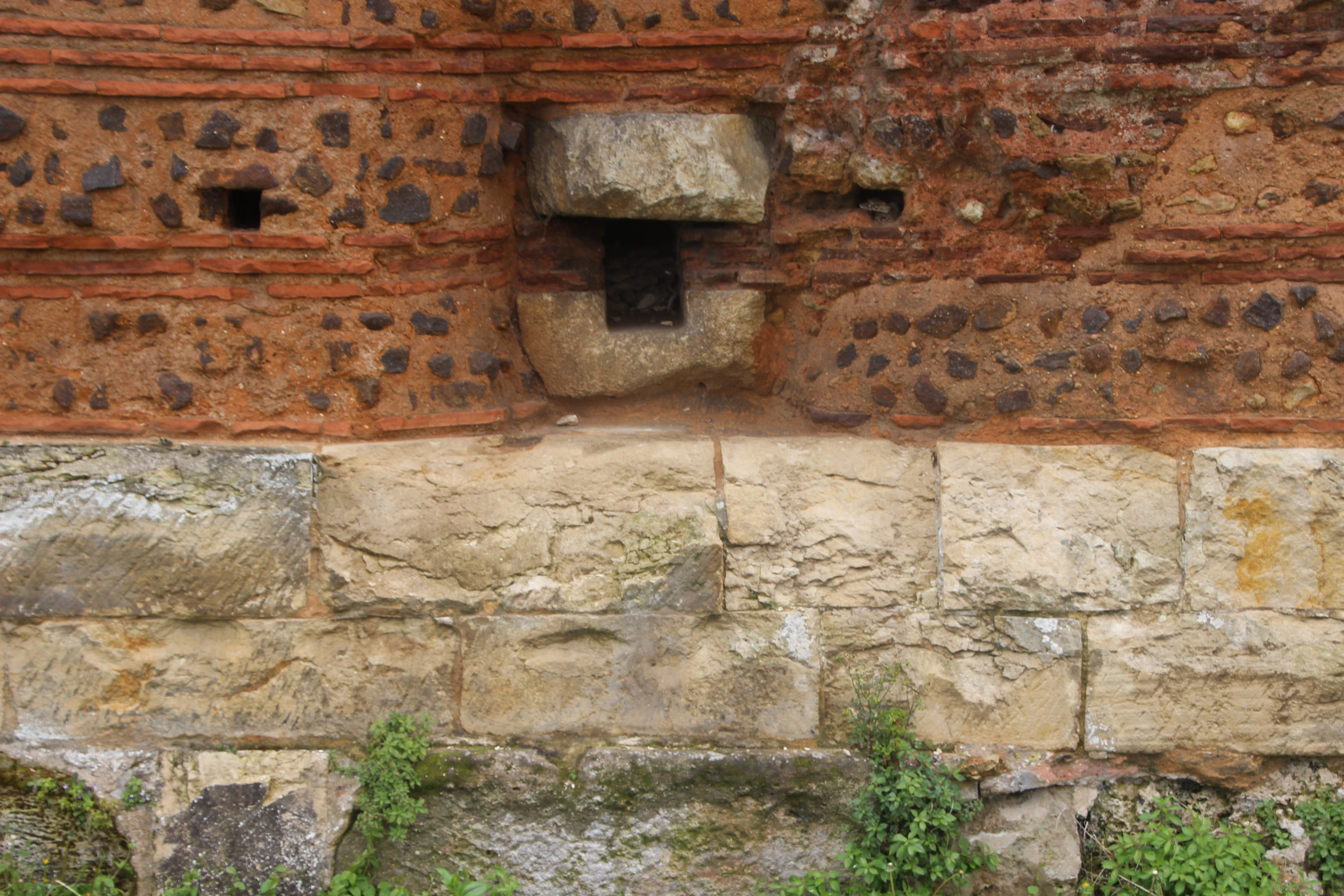
Water outlet between the Madeleine and Hueau towers.

The enclosure is designed to accommodate the necessary water supply and sewage disposal infrastructure. Two aqueducts provided water to the Roman city, though the route of these aqueducts in proximity to the enclosure remains uncertain. (Note: Guilleux 2000, pp. 158–159) In the sixteenth century, another water supply was identified: a lead pipe, the Saint-Alric pipe, which is 1,600 meters in length. (Note: Guilleux 2000, pp. 159–161) Joseph Guilleux identified six water outlets, including one situated between the Madeleine Tower and the Pans-de-Gorron Tower. These outlets facilitated the evacuation of rainwater and sewage. (Note: Guilleux 2000, p. 161)

At its base, the enclosure reached a thickness of 4 m (referred to as a "heavy" enclosure by Louis Maurin). It completely encircled the old city for 1,300 m, with 39 fortified towers visible. These have been documented by both old and recent records, or reconstructed along the route. Joseph Guilleux enumerated many towers, ranging from 40 to 46, or even a theoretical range of 42 to 48. The most recent studies tentatively suggest the existence of approximately forty towers. (Note: Chevet, Meunier & Monteil 2022, p. 189)

The towers are situated at a distance of between 20 and 40 meters from the curtain enclosure. Nineteen of the towers have been preserved in varying states of conservation, ten have been observed by archaeologists and various sources, and ten can be reconstructed on the less-known southeastern faces.

The curtain enclosure, with a width of approximately 4.50 meters, reached a height of approximately 10 meters. A glacis was used to safeguard the curtain enclosure.

Six posterns are identified, four of which are visible, along with three gates, including the Saint-Martin gate, which is preserved beneath a medieval house.

The complex has retained its entire underground layout and a considerable portion of its visible enclosure. These comprise eleven towers and three posterns, which are situated primarily along the western facade bordering the Sarthe. Other posterns exist, which have been incorporated into the houses.

=== Construction method ===
==== Organization of the site ====
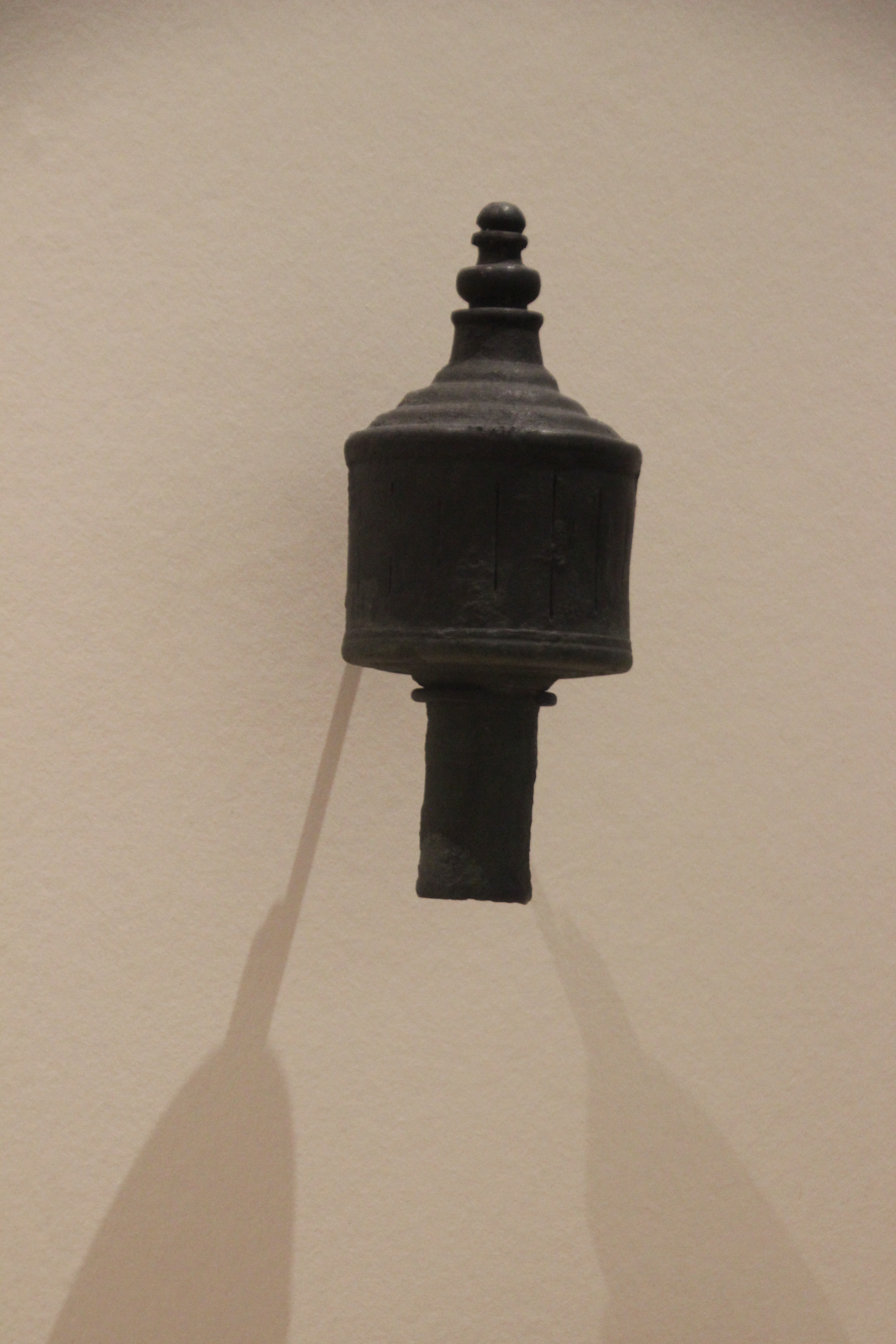
A Roman surveyor's measuring instrument on display at the Musée archéologique du Mans during the Au pied du mur exhibition in 2022–2023.

The project was designed by a specialist in military architecture, namely a member of the army or the imperial administration. The surveyors were responsible for establishing the configuration of the curtain enclosures, gates, and posterns on the ground, taking into account the site's topography. The project also encompassed the planning of sewage and rainwater evacuation systems. In addition, the destruction of public and private buildings, along with the expropriation of land, was a prerequisite for the project's implementation. The estimated area of the city destroyed was between 4 and 12 hectares, which represented between 10 and 15% of the High Empire city. The destroyed area was subsequently leveled. Due to the presence of springs in various locations, including the Saint-Anne fountain near the Oigny Tower, the terrain had to be drained.

A street may have allowed for a circuit within the enclosure, (Note: Guilleux 2000, p. 120) measuring between five and six meters in width. Only one enclosure, situated perpendicular to the curtain enclosure, has survived to the present day and can be dated to the High Empire. It is located within the basements of the town hall. An additional, earlier enclosure was repurposed in the vicinity of the northwest corner. On the exterior, a glacis measuring several tens of meters in width was constructed, resulting in extensive destruction. Between the Pans-de-Gorron tower and the Tunnel tower, the glacis was identified as being 45 meters in width. On the southern and northern sides, it was between 20 meters to 60 meters or even 80 meters in width. This glacis is archaeologically attested. (Note: Guilleux 2000, pp. 121–123) A ditch is attested on three sides for the medieval period. (Note: Guilleux 2000, p. 123)

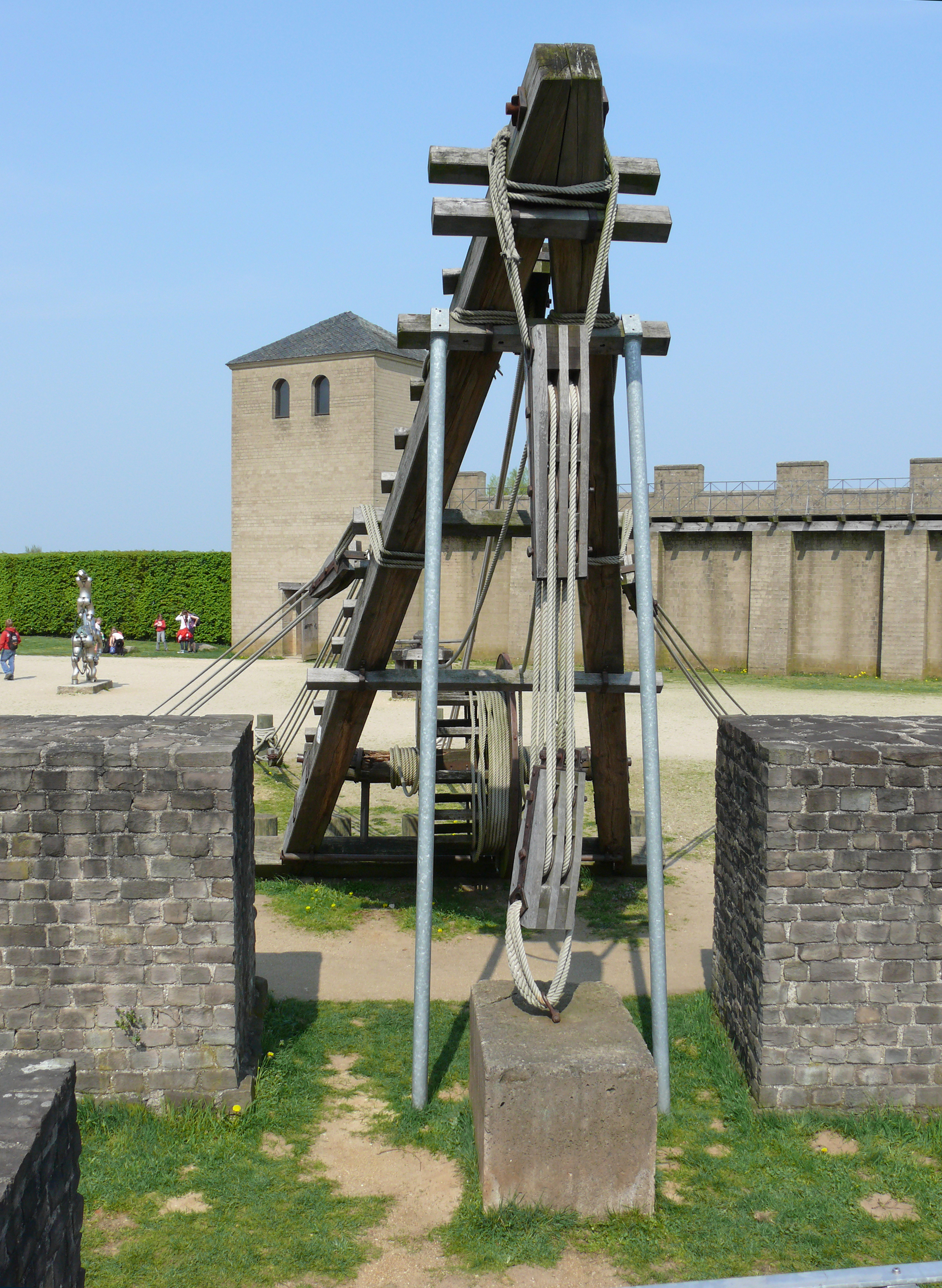
Reconstruction of a Roman crane at Xanten archaeological park.

A trench measuring approximately 5 meters in width and 0.70 to 1 meter in depth was excavated. (Note: Bertrand 2022c, p. 175) The builders sought out soil with high levels of compaction. (Note: Guilleux 2000, p. 124) In certain instances, the construction was reinforced with the use of stakes. Subsequently, stones, assorted blocks, and mortar were laid down. The foundation is not particularly elevated, exhibiting a slight step. The foundation blocks were placed on top, primarily using repurposed materials. The faces of the repurposed blocks were smoothed to ensure high-quality joints. (Note: Guilleux 2000, p. 166) There was no standard size for the foundation blocks. (Note: Guilleux 2000, p. 165) Lifting machines, such as winches, were necessary, as some elements weighed over a ton, and some of the repurposed blocks still bear marks from these machines. The placement of the foundation blocks varied in regularity, which may indicate the presence of multiple teams. (Note: Guilleux 2000, pp. 133–135)

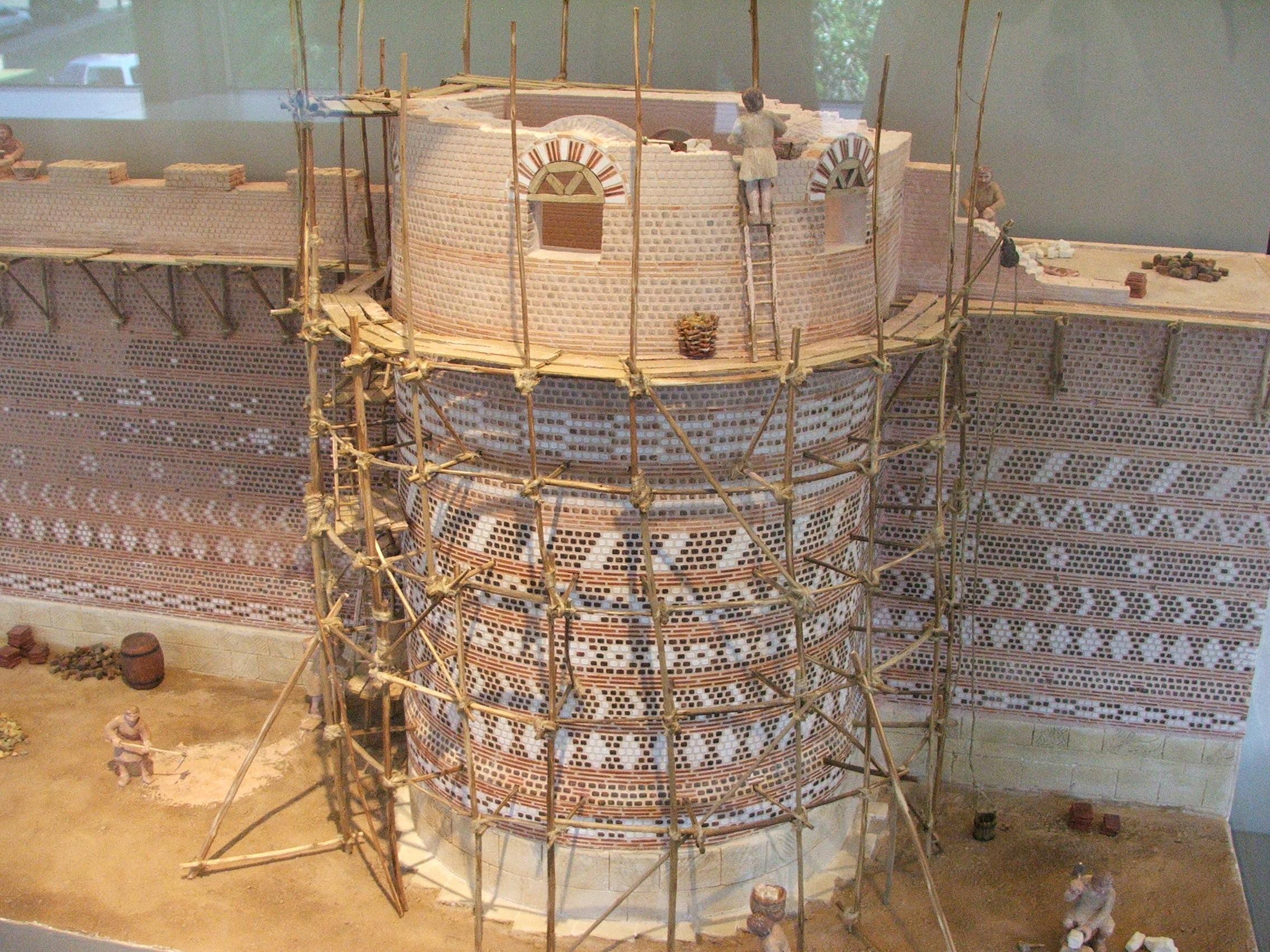
Model of the construction of the wall at the Museum of archaeology and history of Le Mans.

To construct the walls, the builders used scaffolding, the remnants of which can be observed in the form of "putlog" holes. The scaffolds were observed to be present on both sides of the enclosure. The "boulins", measuring 10 to 11 cm in width and 11 to 12 cm in height, did not penetrate the wall and were more prevalent on the external surface to facilitate circulation and supply on the construction site. (Note: Guilleux 2000, p. 237) The holes were finished in a circular manner, which led Joseph Guilleux to suggest that the builders used branches. These holes were not filled in after the construction. A hole in a scaffolding pole was found at a depth of 0.50 meters below the Saint Joseph chapel. The poles were found to be 8 to 10 meters long. (Note: Guilleux 2000, pp. 237–238)

Some teams were engaged in concurrent activities, with each team assigned to a different section. (Note: Guilleux 2000, p. 224) While the teams were required to adhere to a general plan, they were permitted some flexibility in terms of the specifics. (Note: Guilleux 2000, p. 233) The various sections of the construction are visible on one to three courses of masonry. The internal filling and facings (0.60 to 0.70 meters in width) were constructed simultaneously without the use of formwork. At Jublains or for the enclosure at Tours, formwork was employed. (Note: Guilleux 2000, p. 223) The mortar on the internal side has a measurement of 0.30 meters. (Note: Guilleux 2000, p. 149) The joints on the external side of the wall were "iron-drawn", while on the internal side, the joints were constructed with less precision. The iron-drawn joints permitted mortar to penetrate the joint, thereby enhancing both the structural integrity and the aesthetic appeal of the wall. The internal face, frequently composed of sandstone rubble, is devoid of any embellishments, or the pointing was executed with less attention to detail.

The curtain wall was constructed in sections of 3 to 8 meters in length, using a variety of materials and specialized teams, reaching a height of over 10 meters. Construction was interrupted due to the necessity of allowing the mortar to dry or the influence of inclement weather. The opus caementicium filling was completed initially, followed by the facings, which were 0.60 to 0.70 meters wide, thereby obviating the need for formwork. Section joints were identified as a potential source of weakness or collapse. Construction stages may have been constrained by weather conditions or other factors, including labor, technical, or financial limitations.

The towers were a planned element of the project from its inception. The majority of the towers were constructed after the curtain wall, with the wall walk situated at the rear. (Note: Chevet, Meunier & Monteil 2022, p. 190) Construction could also occur concurrently with the curtain wall. The continuity or lack thereof in the facing and decoration between the curtain wall and the towers offers insight into how the project was executed.

==== Materials ====
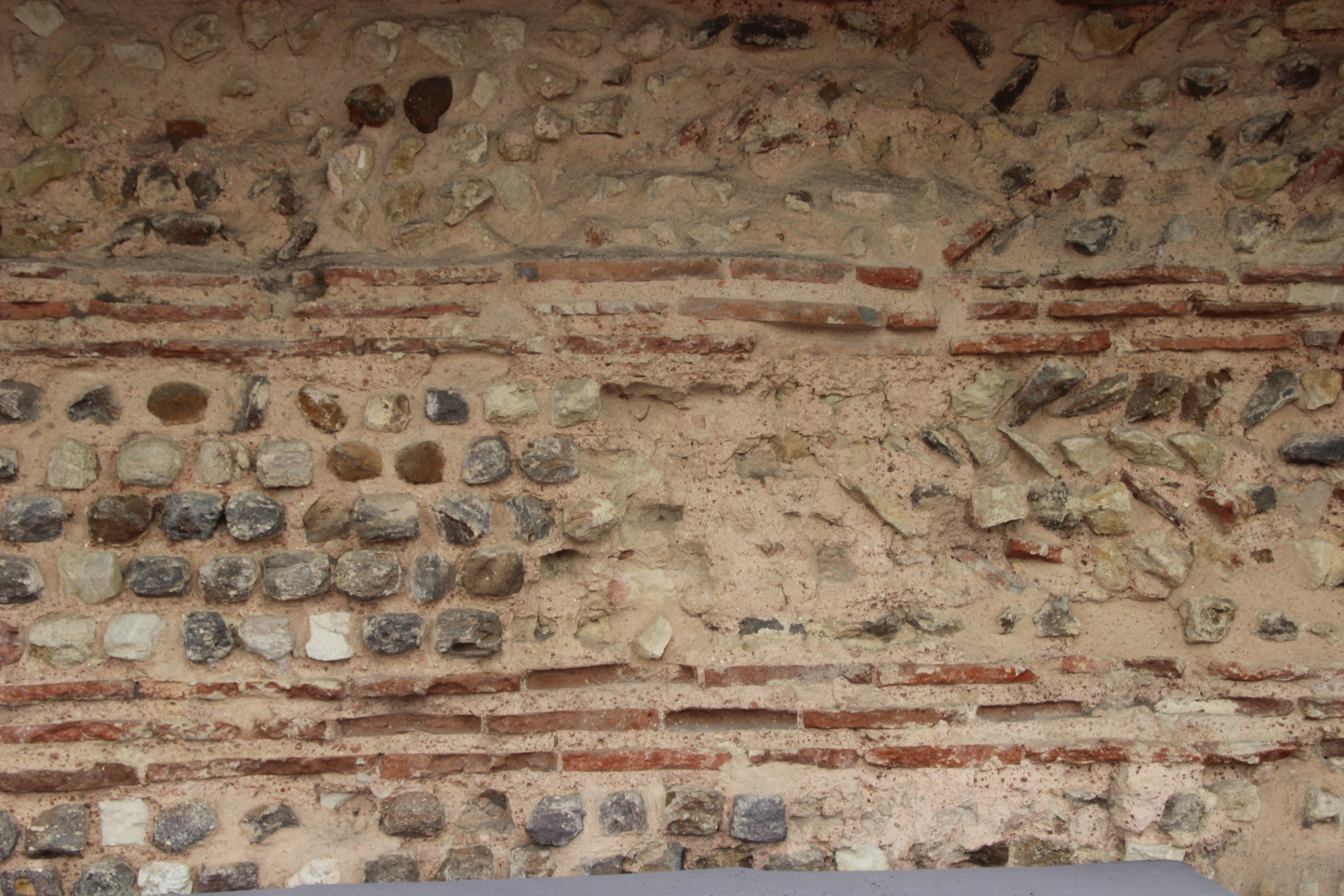
Detail of the facing near the Place du Jet d'Eau, with the rows of bricks and the different colors of rubble used.

The enclosure at Le Mans is composed of a variety of materials, including reused materials, bricks, rubble, and mortar. The estimated volume required for the curtain wall and towers is 70,000 m^{3}. (Note: Guilleux 2000, p. 163) Recent research has facilitated the study of mortars and bricks, the location of quarries, and the examination of wood usage in construction, such as stakes or scaffolding elements.

The wall is of a type common to all Roman construction, consisting of an opus caementicium concrete core and mortar between two facing walls, adorned here with refined patterns between horizontal bands of flat bricks. The enclosure features a succession of brick bands and rubble of various colors, sourced from both reused materials and new extractions.

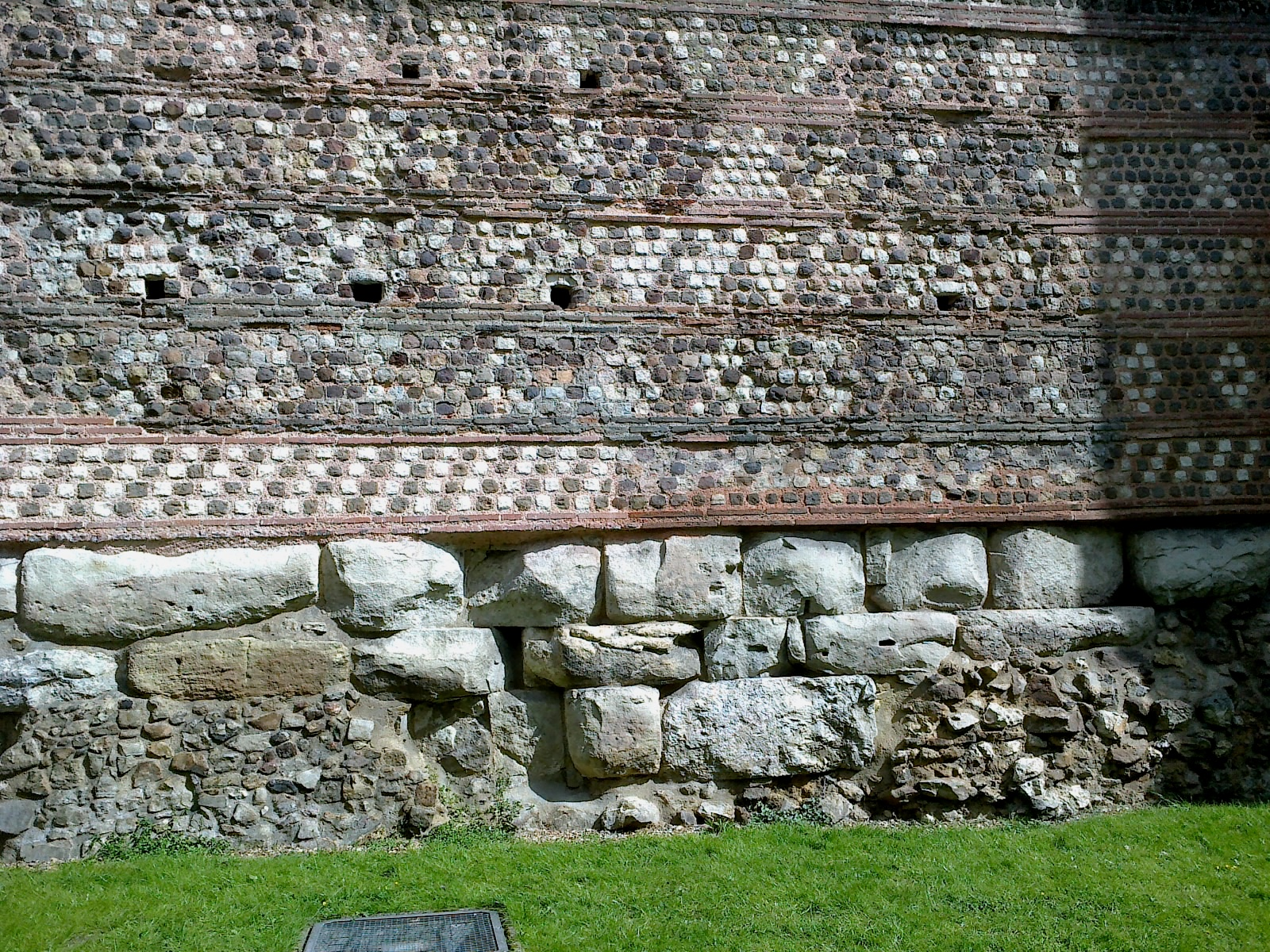
Base of the enclosure with reused levels.

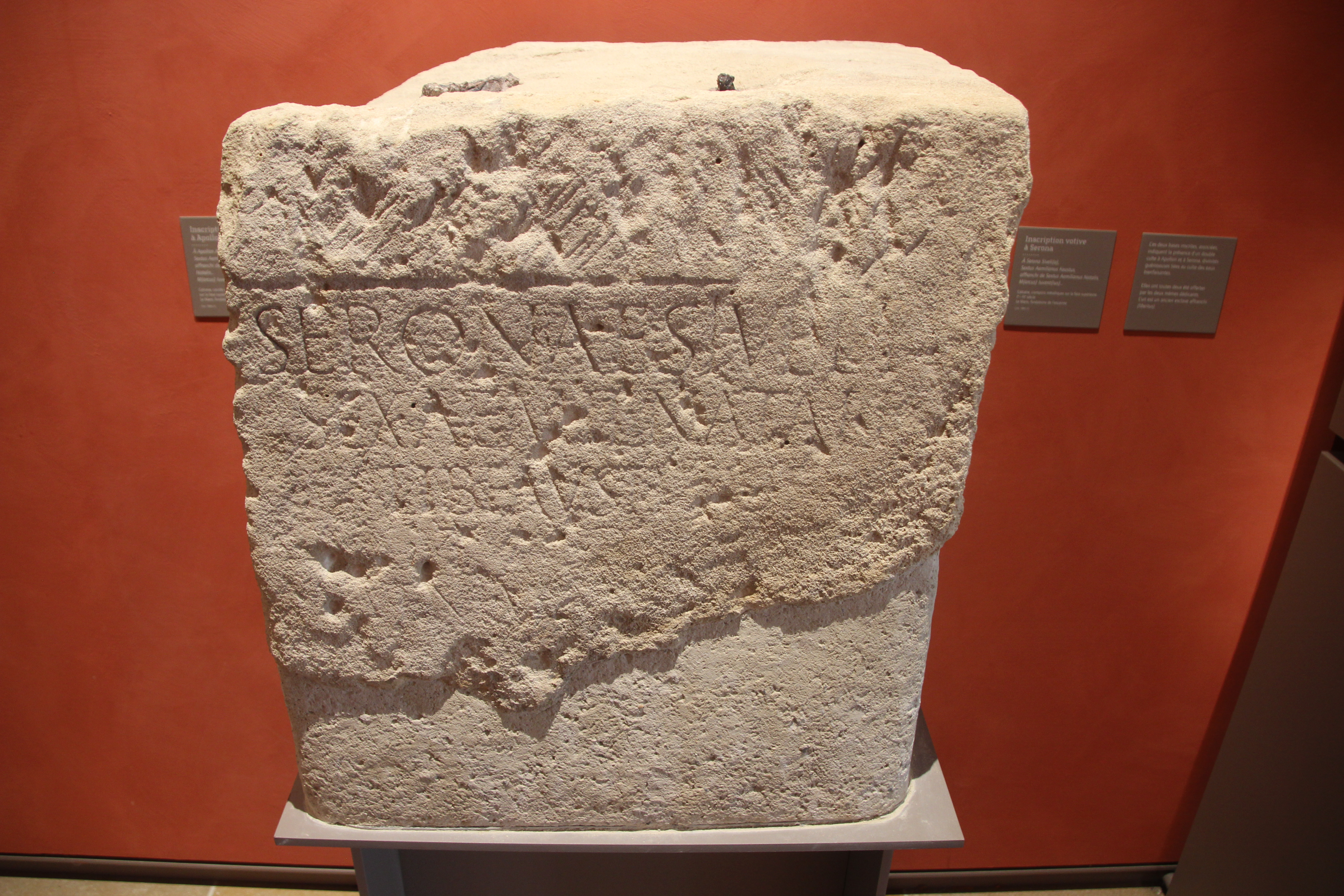
Votive inscription to Serona, Musée archéologique du Mans, found in the curtain wall between the Petite Poterne and the Petit Saint-Pierre tower. (Note: Guilleux 2000, p. 173)

During the construction of the wall, materials from older buildings were reused. (Note: Chevet, Meunier & Monteil 2022, pp. 188–189) In the wall, fragments of columns and pediments from earlier monuments can be found, some of which were demolished to make way for the new imposing project that included the wall and its defensive ditch system. The foundation blocks were laid with great precision and care. (Note: Guilleux 2000, p. 129)

It is possible that the construction reused materials from destroyed buildings of the Early Empire that were no longer in use. These materials were incorporated into the foundation and the initial levels of the wall, up to a height of three to five courses. However, the reuse was not limited to the external face; it extended to the internal face as well. Some elements, composed of limestone or, on rare occasions, sandstone, have a weight exceeding one ton. Approximately fifteen blocks have been identified, while others remain embedded in the foundations of the wall. Among the identified blocks are a cornice block, a bas-relief, and votive inscriptions. The materials used in the construction of the foundations may have been sourced from public buildings or significant tombs. It is estimated that 4,500 m^{3} of materials were reused, which is relatively low compared to other urban walls, such as those in Rennes or Tours. This may be attributed to a limited number of public monuments or their preservation, or even the cost of transportation. (Note: Guilleux 2000, p. 132) It is possible that the public buildings were situated within the wall or were in a state of good repair, thereby preventing their destruction. The number of reused blocks that have been identified is limited, and some architectural elements that were known from previous demolitions have not been preserved. (Note: Guilleux 2000, p. 168) Elements from bas-reliefs, including one featuring two figures, were extracted from the base of the Oigny tower. (Note: Guilleux 2000, pp. 170–171) Votive inscriptions, one of which was dedicated to Apollo, have been found. (Note: Guilleux 2000, p. 172)

The bricks used in the construction are predominantly 32 × 26 cm in dimension; however, a few are slightly larger (38 × 28 cm). Additionally, bricks measuring approximately 50 cm were sourced from a thermal building undergoing surplus construction. The bricks exhibit a thickness range of 3.5 to 5.5 centimeters. (Note: Guilleux 2000, p. 175) The bricks were used exclusively for the facing, with up to 11 rows stacked within the structure. Additionally, bricks were employed in the construction of posterns and towers. The use of the material was both functional and ornamental. Archaeologists estimate that 400,000 bricks were employed in the construction. The workshops, which required a considerable area, were situated outside the city. The bricks were specifically fabricated for the wall and are arranged on the external side in three rows and a depth of two, with a lesser number on the internal face of the wall. Up to ten brick courses are located at the base. The reuse of bricks would have resulted in a structural weakness in the wall.

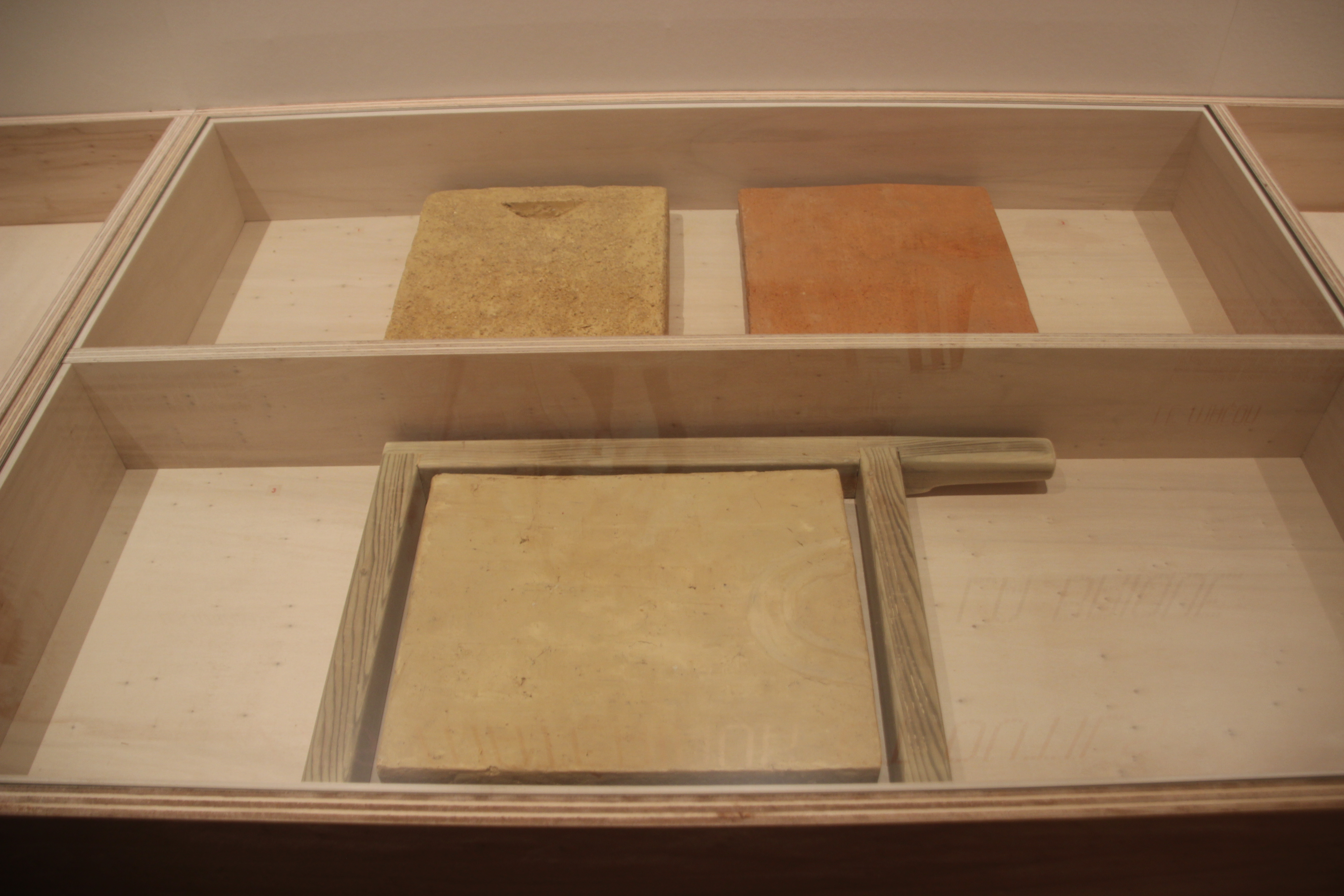
Different types of mortar used on site, on display at the 2022–2023 Le Mans exhibition.

The lime mortar used in the project, estimated at 60,000 tons, can be classified into two distinct types. To bind the elements of the internal core, a lime and siliceous sand mixture is used, resulting in a white-to-beige color. The mortar used for the facing joints is composed of lime, crushed tiles, and sand, exhibiting a color range from light to dark pink. It possesses waterproof qualities and a more aesthetically pleasing appearance. The distinctive red hue of the bricks and the pink-red mortar used in the construction earned the city the sobriquet "Red City." (Note: Guilleux 2000, p. 136) A detailed examination of the mortar reveals the stages of the construction project. The lime was produced locally, perhaps near the site, although no kiln has been found. However, specialists do not rule out the possibility of production outside the city. (Note: Guilleux 2000, p. 136)

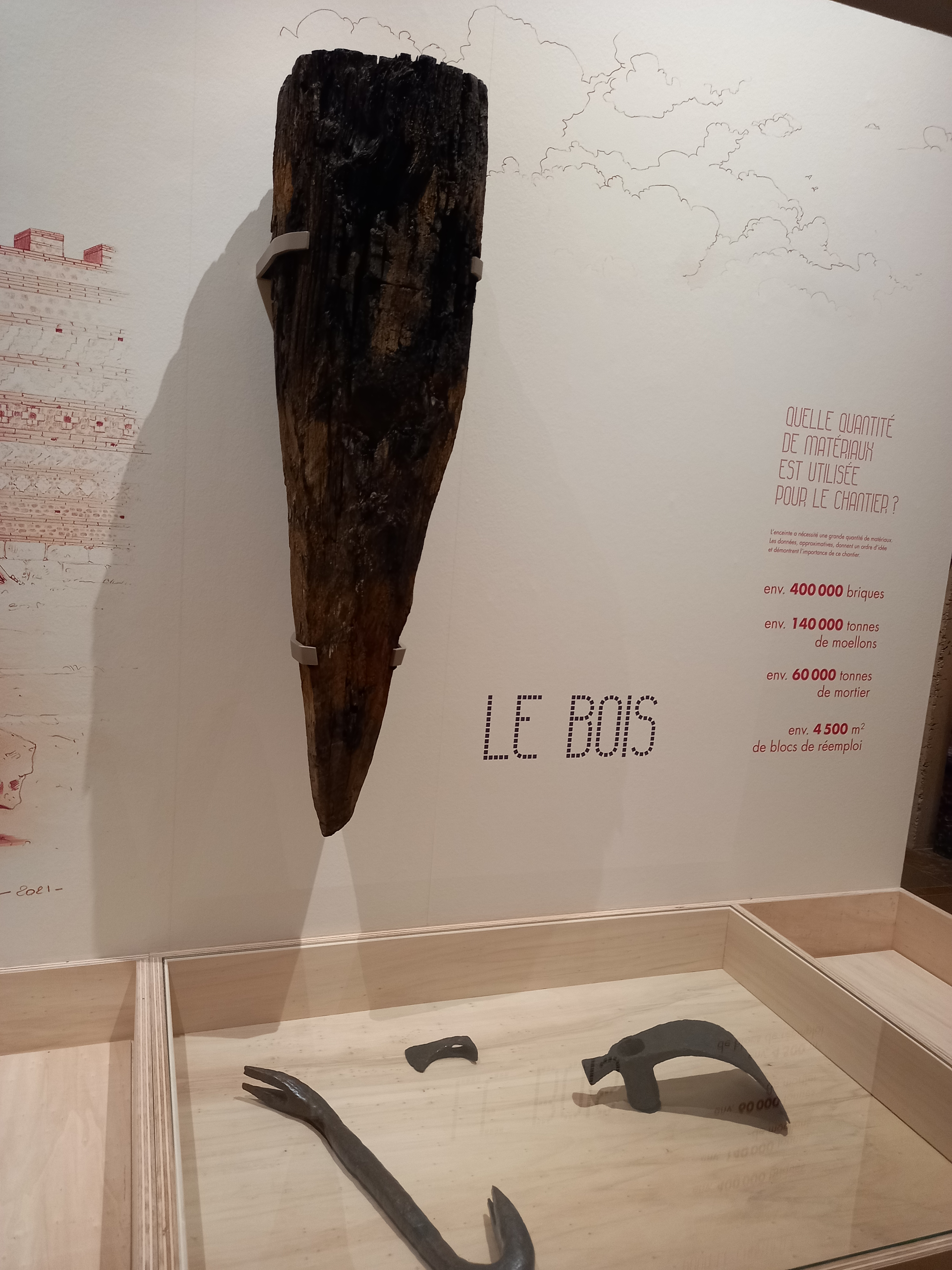
Enclosure pile.

The study of wood in this context is challenging due to the lack of preserved internal elements of the towers. It can be reasonably assumed that a considerable amount of wood was used on the site. The presence of numerous boulin holes provides evidence of the scaffolding that was erected. The excavations of the Saint-Joseph tower revealed the presence of wooden stake marks, with the number of stakes estimated to be approximately 60. These stakes were identified as tree-trunk stakes, which were discovered in excavations from the 1970s under the curtain wall at the southwest corner. The use of these stakes may have been employed to secure the construction due to the challenging terrain, which consisted of sandy or clayey soil with numerous springs in some areas. (Note: Bertrand 2022c, pp. 175–176)

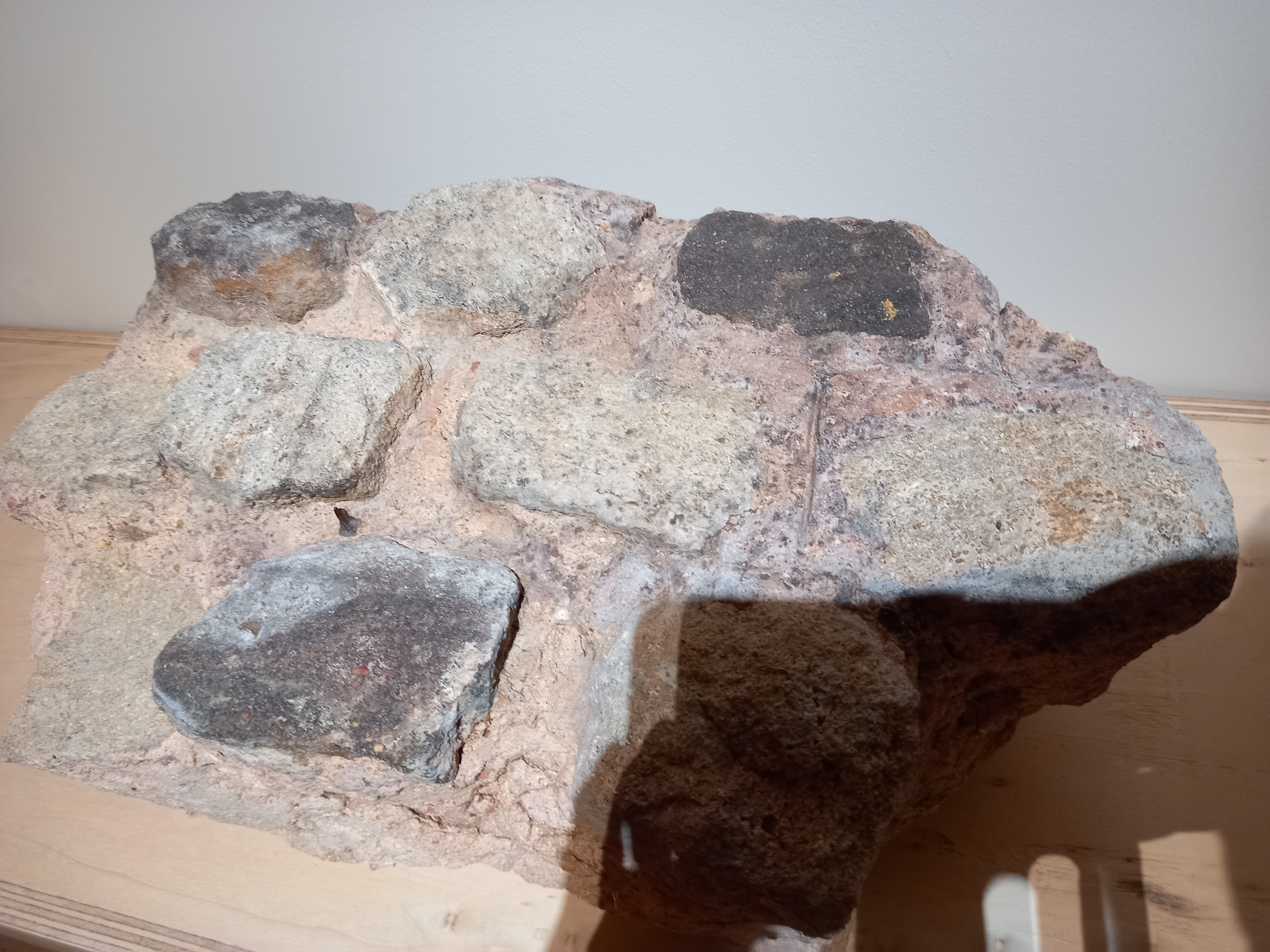
Rubble from the walls of Le Mans.

The substantial stone blocks are derived from edifices erected during the 1st and 2nd centuries. The rubble stones were either reused or extracted from local sources. The stones include sandstones and limestones, with eleven local limestones and one sandstone having been identified. The estimated volume is 140,000 tons. The cutting of the rubble stones, with a height of 9 cm, a width of approximately 10 cm to 13 cm, and a depth of 17 cm to 20 cm, suggests an "intent to standardize." Larger but also regular stones were used for the corner chains and junctions of the curtain wall, (Note: Guilleux 2000, p. 147) by the standardization dictated by the regularity of the different levels of the walls. (Note: Guilleux 2000, p. 174)

=== Curtain walls, towers, gates, and posterns ===
==== Curtain walls ====
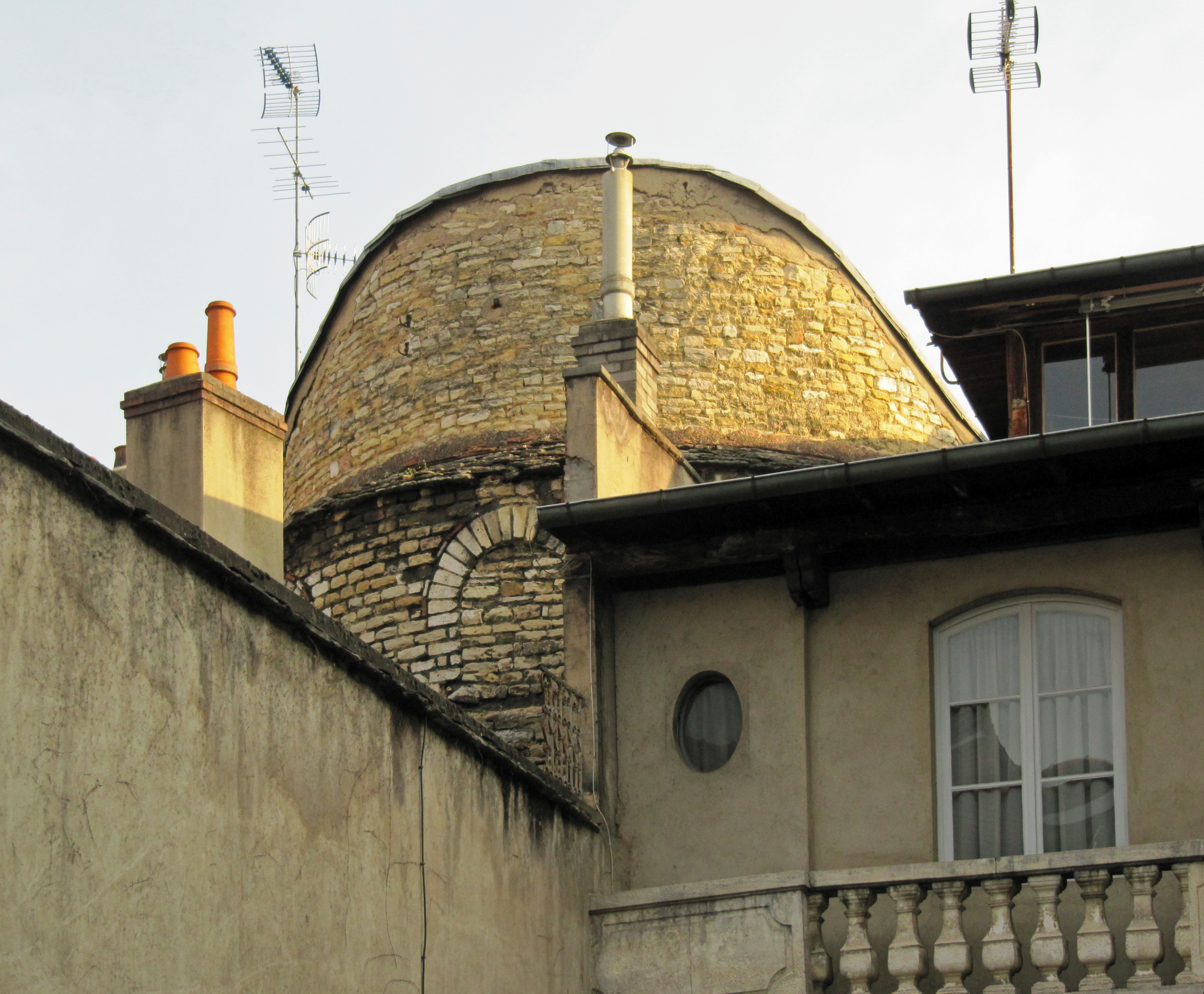
Roman tower in Dijon's city walls, known as the Petit Saint-Bénigne.

The precise original height of the curtain enclosure is uncertain due to modifications that have been made to it. Preserved at the northwest corner of the enclosure is a height of approximately 11 meters. (Note: Guilleux 2000, p. 140) This height corresponds to the height mentioned by Gregory of Tours for the Dijon enclosure. In History of the Franks (III, 19), he also describes the significant role of Dijon as a fortress city with four gates, 33 towers, and enclosures over four meters thick. The top was crowned by a parapet approximately two meters high, which protected a walkway.

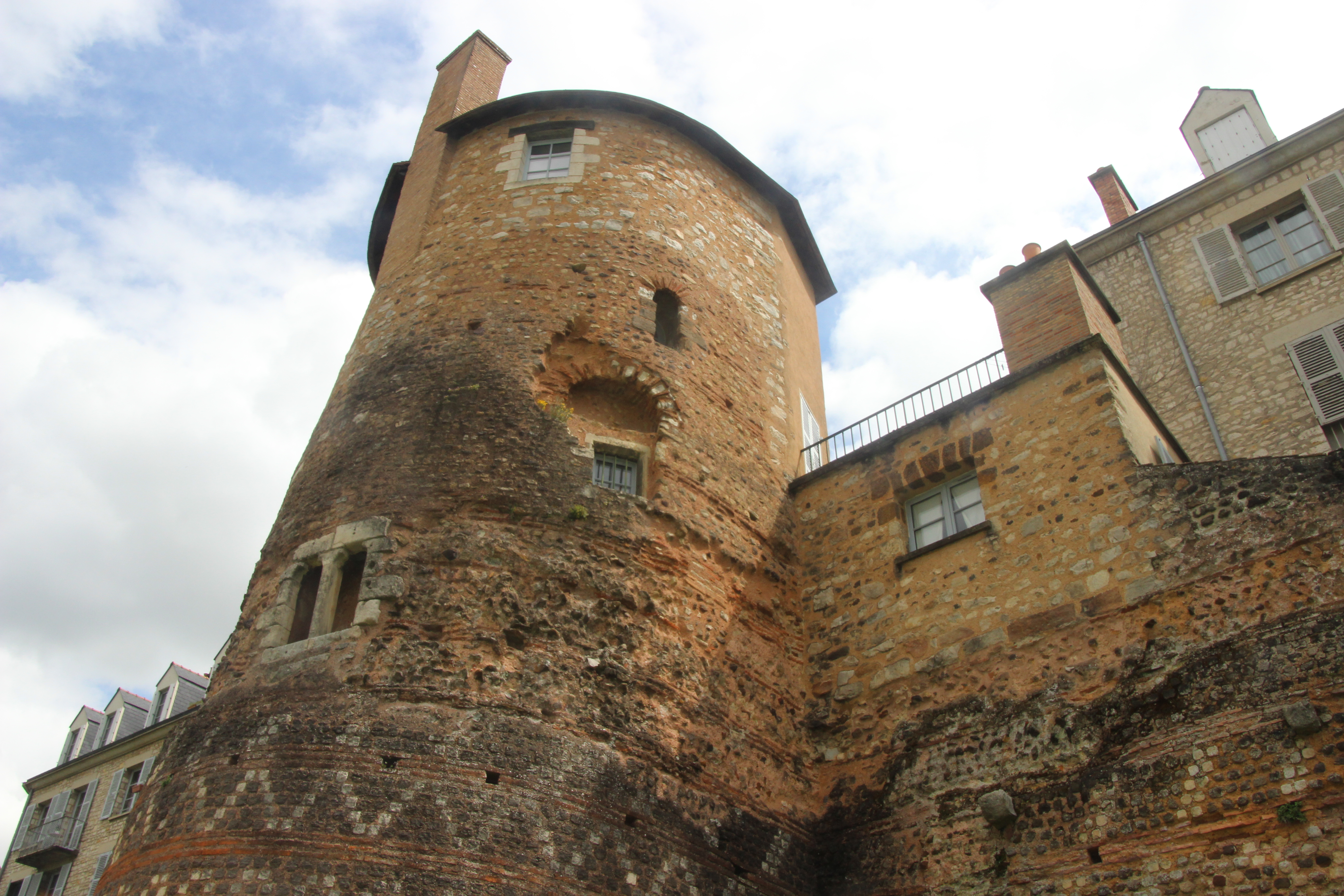
Tour Madeleine and presumed remains of the parapet.

The irregular enclosure exhibits a decrease in thickness with height. (Note: Guilleux 2000, pp. 143–146) The curtain enclosure is 4 to 5 meters thick at the base and becomes thinner as it rises, either due to the withdrawal of the external facing or by "a slight slope." The enclosure is 3 meters thick at the top. The average height of the curtain enclosure is 10 meters, and it was topped by a merlon, a vestige of which remains near the Madeleine Tower. In addition to their ornamental function, the brick string courses serve a structural purpose by stabilizing the enclosure facing. (Note: Guilleux 2000, pp. 149–150)

The enclosure was surmounted by a parapet measuring between 1.80 and 2 meters in height. This structure was equipped with a walkway that could be accessed via stairs or ramps and was flanked by battlements. However, the parapet has since disappeared, with only the Madeleine Tower retaining vestiges of it at a height of 1.80 meters. (Note: Guilleux 2000, p. 141)

==== Towers ====
The towers were either constructed simultaneously with the enclosure ("organic tower", according to Joseph Guilleux (Note: Guilleux 2000, p. 177)) or subsequently, in which case a provisional facing was installed. A combination of construction techniques is also evident at Jublains. (Note: Guilleux 2000, p. 261)

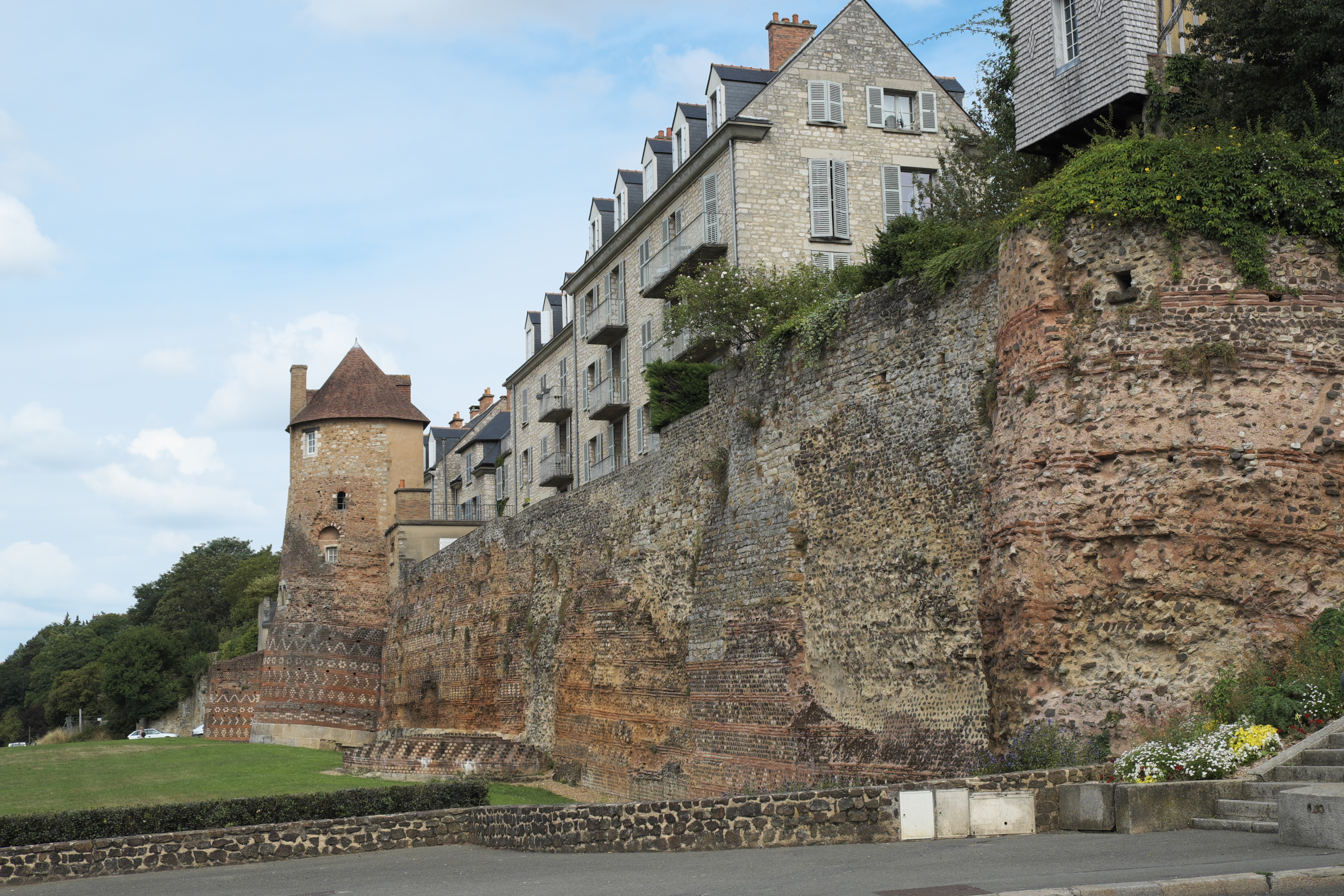
View of the Roman wall on the Sarthe side, from the Tunnel tower.

The towers were constructed using the same method as the curtain enclosure, (Note: Guilleux 2000, p. 154) albeit at irregular intervals. The towers are situated at intervals of between 20 and 40 meters. In accordance with Vitruvius' recommendations (1, V, 3 and 1, V, 5), the placement of the towers and the intervals between them on the western façade adhere to these specifications. The towers on the Sarthe side exhibit the largest intervals between them, approximately 30 meters, due to the reduced threat posed by their orientation towards the river. In contrast, the interval is 15 meters on the more exposed northern façade. (Note: Guilleux 2000, pp. 176–177)

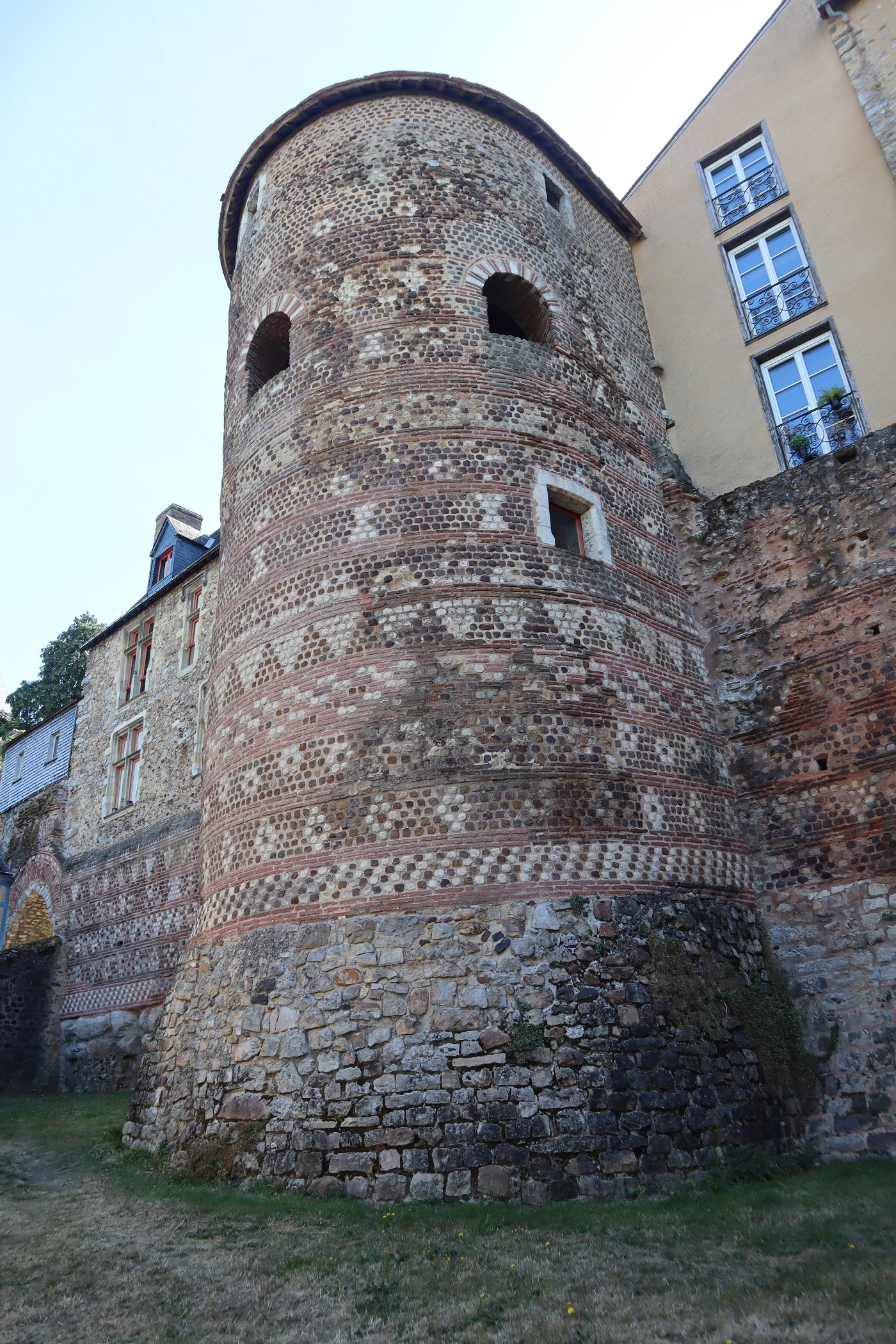
General view of the Vivier Tower elevation in 2020.

The precise height of the towers is uncertain, with the tallest preserved measuring between 13 and 14 meters. However, it is reasonable to conclude that the maximum height must have been between 15 and 17 meters.

The towers exhibit a variety of shapes, similar to those observed in other urban enclosures. These include U-shaped structures, nearly complete circles, and two hexagonal towers: (Note: Chevet, Meunier & Monteil 2022, pp. 189–190) (Note: Guilleux 2000, p. 156) the Pans-de-Gorron Tower and the Saint-Michel Tower. The proximity of these two examples to vanished posterns suggests the possibility of other similar towers, though these too have been destroyed. Three corner towers have been preserved. (Note: Guilleux 2000, p. 181) Some towers have a semicircular base and were constructed following a similar pattern. (Note: Guilleux 2000, pp. 181–182) The projecting towers serve two purposes: they protect the enclosure from attackers and also support the curtain enclosure.

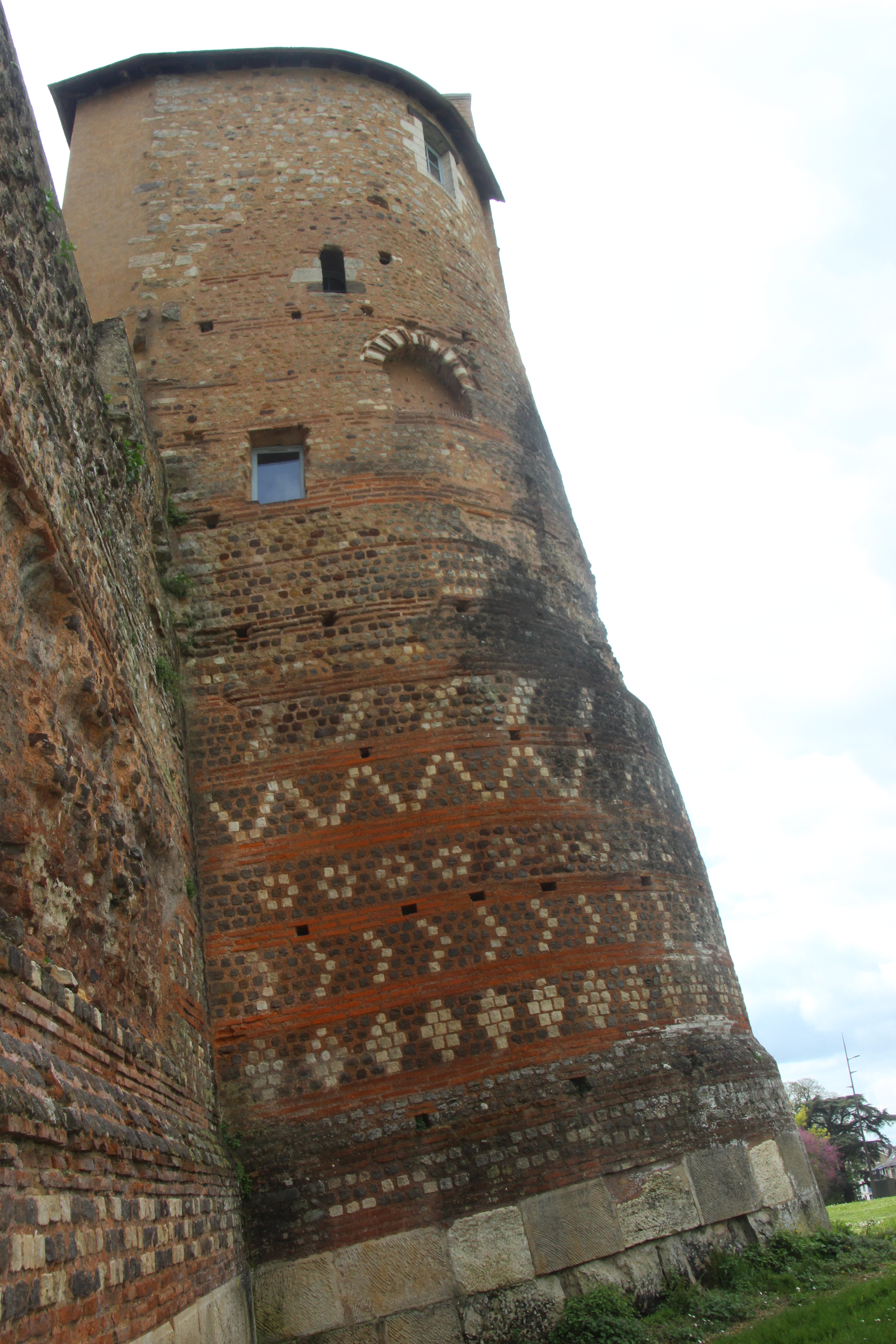
View from the left, the Madeleine Tower appears very oblique.

The towers are constructed with a pronounced slope, which serves to stabilize the curtain enclosure. The enclosure at the level of the windows of the Vivier Tower is approximately 0.90 meters thick. (Note: Guilleux 2000, p. 186) The towers were equipped with a drainage system.

Some excavated towers have a foundation platform. The base, which reaches a height of up to 3.70 meters, is solid and sometimes includes rooms without windows. The lower rooms have enclosures that are approximately 1.30 meters thick. (Note: Guilleux 2000, pp. 184–186)

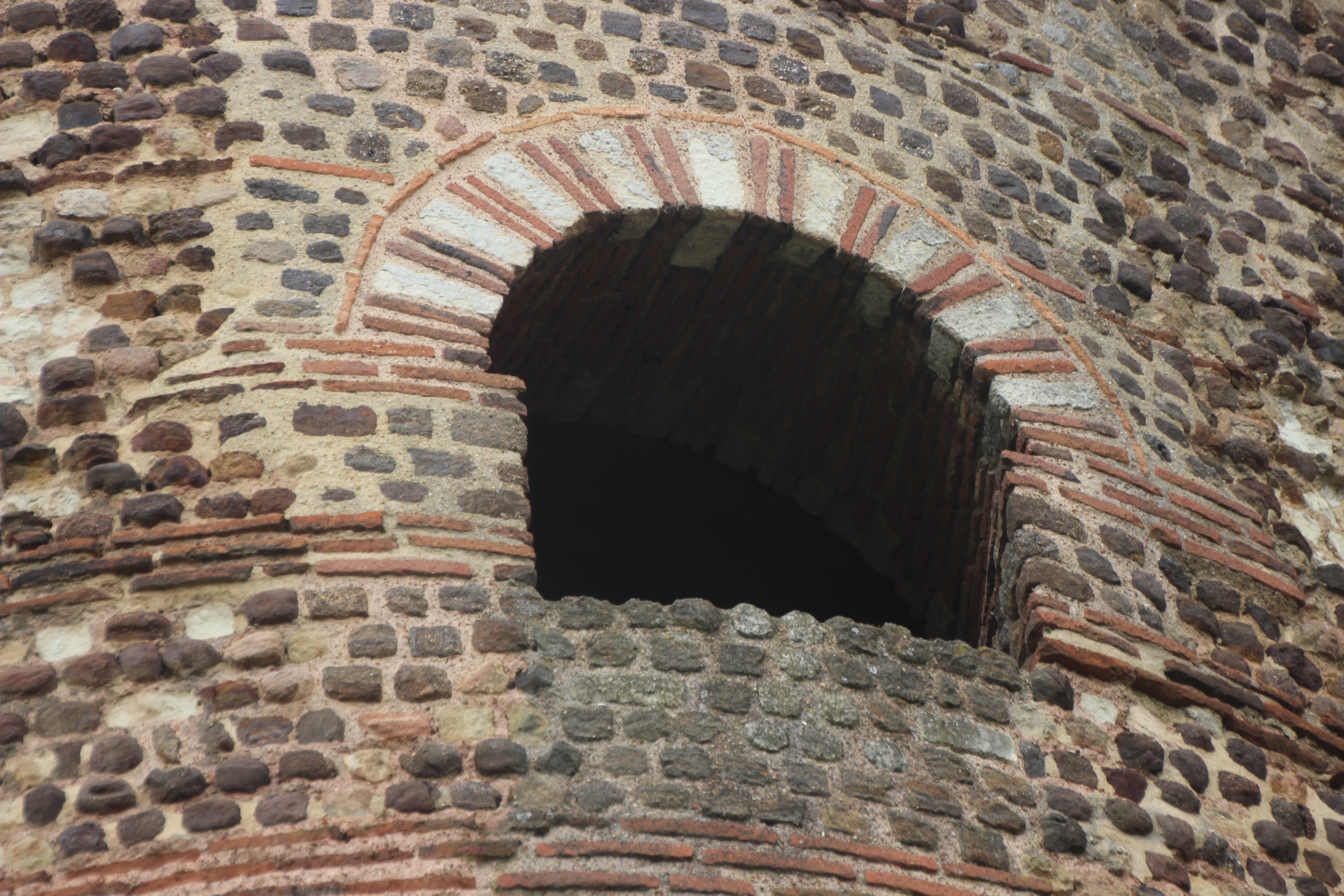
One of the windows in the Vivier tower.

Two upper rooms were present, with three windows that are sometimes preserved. These upper rooms may have been accessible from the walkway. The windows are preserved in the upper parts of the Vivier and Madeleine Towers. Constructed of brick and limestone, they are 1.30 to 1.60 meters high and 1.10 to 1.65 meters wide. The windows were constructed in a relatively standardized manner. (Note: Guilleux 2000, p. 189)

The uppermost rooms, accessible via a movable ladder, are in a state of significant deterioration or lack thereof, and the covering is yet to be definitively identified. While a sloped roof with tiles remains a plausible hypothesis, it is not the only possibility. The covering could also have been a platform.

==== Gates ====
The complex is known to have included at least three gates, of which two are only known through textual sources and archaeological evidence. (Note: Guilleux 2000, p. 101) The Saint-Martin Gate is the only one that has been preserved in the basement of a medieval house, featuring a bay for vehicles and two pedestrian bays. Two other gates may have been located on the small southern and northern sides.

General view of Trier's Porta Nigra, an emblematic example of a city gate, seen from the countryside.

The topography of the site precludes the possibility of there having been a gate on each side, particularly on the western facade. The northern side may have had a monumental gate due to the site's topography, which included a regular slope. Excavations conducted in 1860 in this area indicate that the gates were equipped with a porch, one or two passages, and semicircular towers outside the enclosure, (Note: Guilleux 2000, p. 102) in accordance with a "classical pattern." (Note: Guilleux 2000, p. 157) The Saint-Martin Gate is situated at the end of a recess in the enclosure, in alignment with Vitruvius' principle of roads approaching from the left and exposing the attackers' right flank.

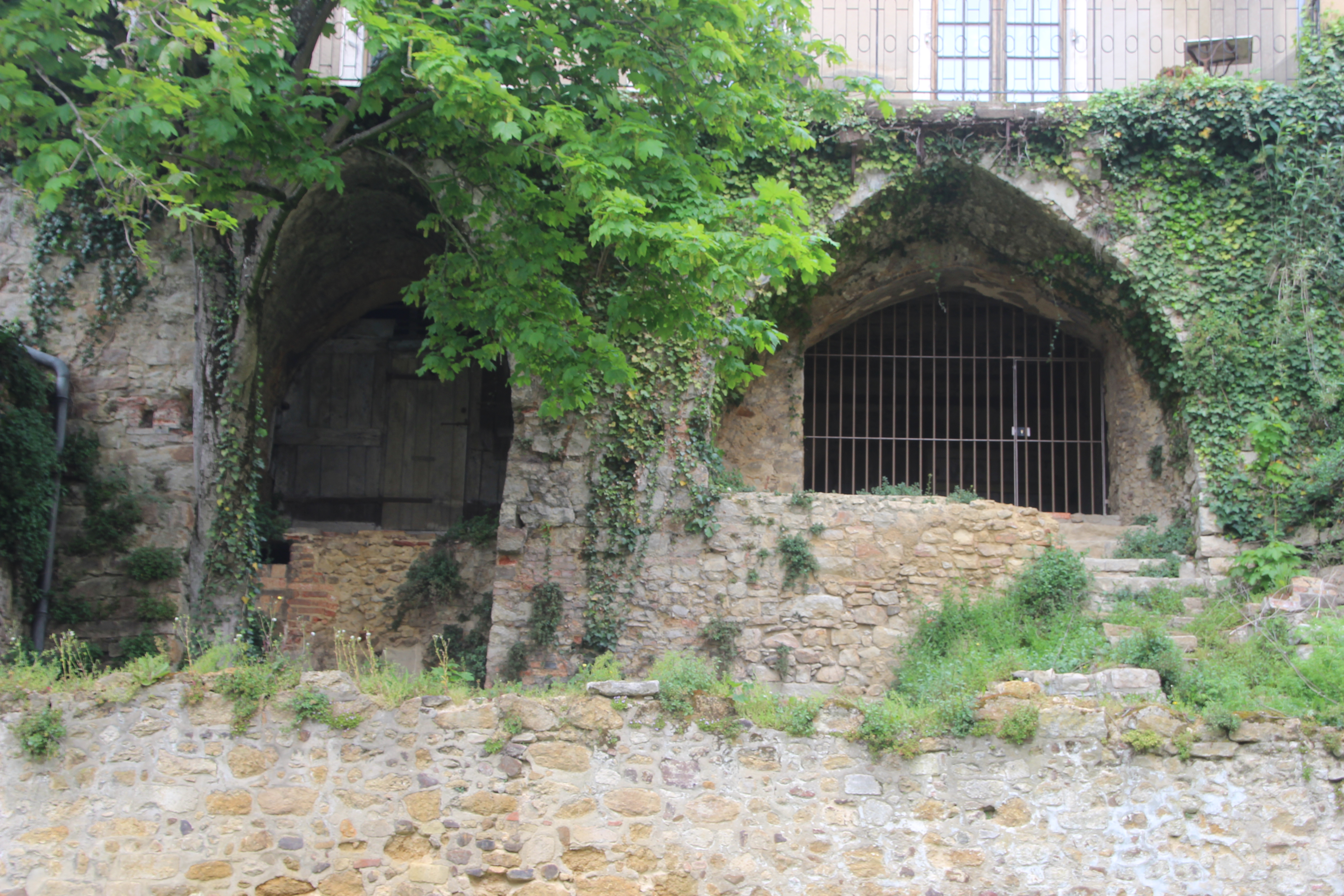
Detail of the two bays of the Porte Saint-Martin.

The central arch of the gate is 3.90 meters wide, 1.83 meters deep, and over 3 meters high; an arch to the left is slightly smaller, with a width of 2.72 meters and a height of 3.20 meters. (Note: Guilleux 2000, p. 104) The internal rooms of the gate were the subject of a study conducted in the late 19th century. (Note: Guilleux 2000, pp. 104–107)

The gate's façade measured 16 meters in length and featured a single central passageway with two lateral entrances for pedestrians. This configuration facilitated the regulation of access to the city. (Note: Guilleux 2000, p. 107) The gate's vestibule was protected by two towers.

==== Posterns ====
The posterns in the Le Mans enclosure are an approximation of Vitruvius' precepts, being flanked by towers. (Note: Guilleux 2000, p. 158) At least six posterns on the eastern facade (Note: Guilleux 2000, p. 109) allowed access for pedestrians and riders; the Grande Poterne is the best preserved among them.

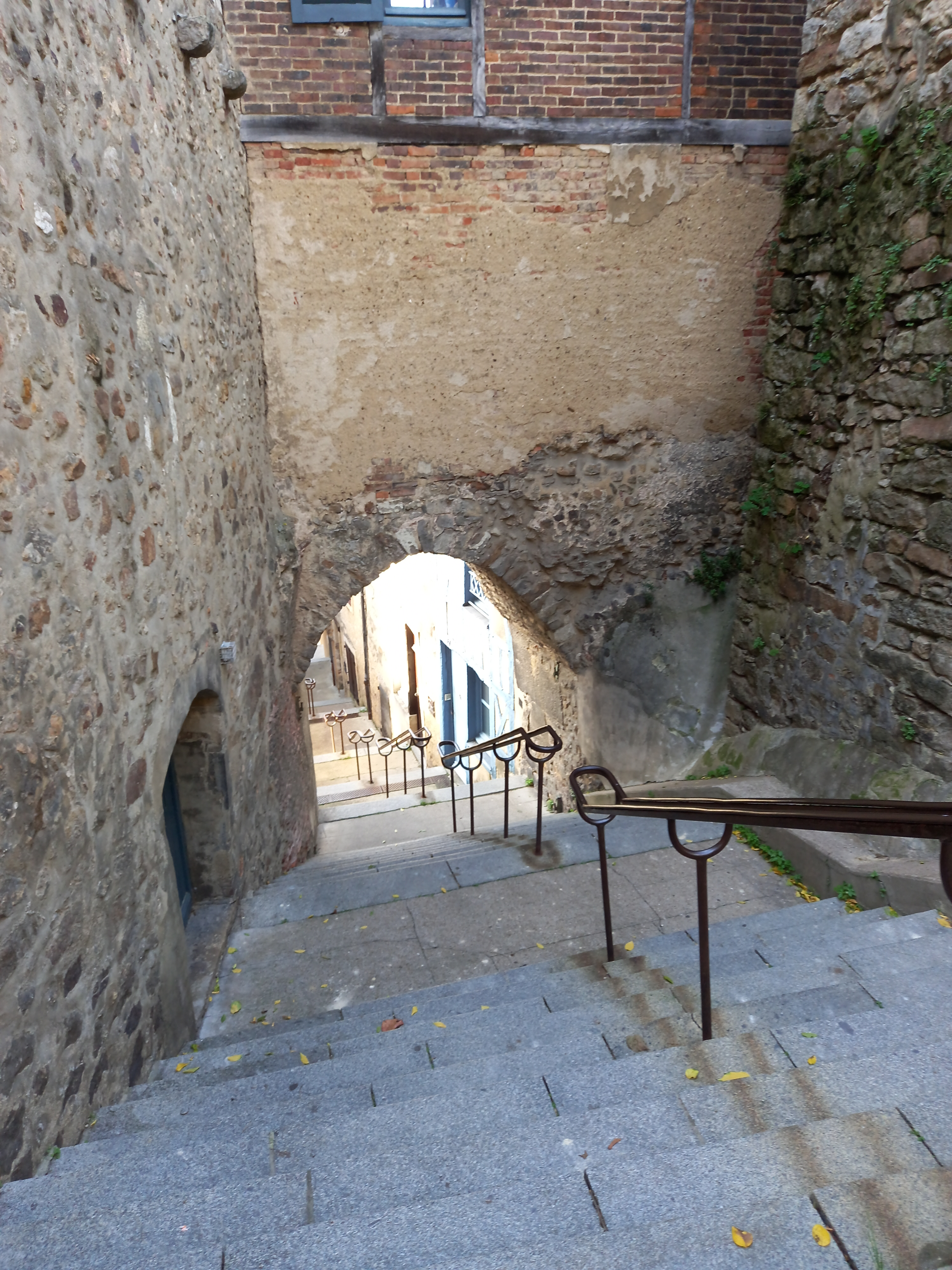
Interior view of the Grande Poterne staircase.

The posterns, which measured between 1.90 and 2.85 meters in width, could be closed from the rear with doors. Joseph Guilleux suggests that the Western facade may have had a comparable number of posterns. He notes the presence of a postern near the Saint-Bertrand house, situated between the cathedral and the Saint-Michel Tower. (Note: Guilleux 2000, p. 112) However, this postern is not included in the 2022 plans. The access paths to the posterns were observed to be extremely steep.

Some posterns on the Sarthe side were linked to routes leading to the river. These posterns were situated at the extremities of reclaimed valleys.

The enclosure is defined by three or four salient points, including the Fossés-Saint-Pierre salient, the rue de la Truie-qui-file salient, the Saint-Benoît salient, and a final salient that may have occupied the northwest corner. (Note: Guilleux 2000, p. 116)

==== Details of the enclosure elements ====
The following table provides a summary of the posterns, gates, and towers, beginning with the north gate and proceeding in a clockwise direction. The names of these structures are provided where applicable. The numbers and letters in the first column refer to the markers on the "Plan of the Gallo-Roman Enclosure" figure:

	Posterns, gates, and towers	Current state	Notes	Coordinates	Illustration
A	North gate	Disappeared. Mentioned in an 8th-century text. The sector was modified in the 11th, 14th, and 15th centuries. The precise location is unknown, but it is between the Margot Tower and the Cavalier Tower, on the current Place du Cardinal-Grente.			Place du Cardinal Grente, presumed site of the North Gate
1	Margot Tower	The tower, near the cathedral, may have housed the Saint-Aubin Monastery. There is medieval masonry dated to the 15th century, with an ancient core persisting.			Fragment of a wall with the Margot Tower and part of the cathedral.
2	Tower	Remnants exist on the Robert-Triger Square side. The destruction may be contemporary with that of the enclosure that protected the bishopric.			
3	Psallette Tower	In good condition, altered during the construction of the episcopal palace. (Note: Augry & Meunier 2022b, p. 139) The ancient facing is preserved to the east for 1.76 meters and to the west for 3.33 meters. The tower is embedded 3 meters into the ground.			
4	Bishop's Tower	Destroyed in the 14th or 15th century, the tower was discovered during excavations in 1992. The diameter was 8.30 meters.			Historic monument no longer standing
5	St. Joseph Tower	The tower's location was identified in 1992. It is a corner tower. (Note: Augry & Meunier 2022b, p. 140) Traces of removal are present on a 6-meter width. Traces of the foundation piles were found during excavations in the cathedral garden. The destruction is dated to the 13th century, during the reconstruction of the cathedral's choir.			Curtain wall adjoining the cathedral, with St. Joseph's tower torn away.
6	Tower?	The existence of remnants of one or two towers is suggested in the cathedral's choir.			
7	Saint-Michel Tower	An oratory was noted in this tower at the beginning of the 7th century. The tower, present on 18th-century maps, is no longer noted on the 1812 cadastre. Remains were found during Joseph Guilleux's excavations in 1994. Razed to the level of a lower room, the remains were subsequently buried. It was excavated again in 2019. (Note: Meunier 2022c, p. 131) Archaeologists found an arrow traced in the mortar on the curtain enclosure, possibly used to indicate the tower's position on the curtain enclosure.			Walls and modern structure covering them.
B	Saint-Michel postern				
8	Juteau Hotel Tower	The tower has not been studied and is only known due to the distances. It may have been located on the Sainte-Catherine canon's house and the Hôtel Juteau. The tower might have been connected to another hexagonal tower related to a postern and perhaps adopted this shape.			
9	Fayau Tower	The name comes from a tenant from the mid-14th century. It is also called the English Tower. The decision to destroy it was made in 1751 due to the ruinous state of the building. It disappeared. It was finally demolished in 1778, but an imprint remains. The imprint in the enclosure, about 5 meters, suggests a shape similar to the Hueau Tower. (Note: Guilleux 2000, p. 183)			Wilbur-Wright tunnel and Fayau tower footprint.
10	Engoufer Tower	The tower is known by various names and was located to the left of the current tunnel or at its entrance. The tower served as the seat of the city's chambers until 1600. It disappeared. Described as being in poor condition as early as 1745, it was destroyed between 1776–1778. (Note: Meunier 2022a, p. 161)			
C	Comedy postern	The postern was discovered in 1999, and two rows of vaulting blocks were identified by Joseph Guilleux. (Note: Guilleux 2000, p. 113)			
11	Brittany Tour	It was identified under the current city hall, under the "old election chamber", and integrated into a quadrangular medieval tower. It was partially excavated, and a height of 5.66 meters was identified. Another tower would be located before the lower room of the Gros-Pilier Tower.			Remains of the Brittany Tower.
12	Ponts-Neufs Tower	The tower was destroyed at the end of the 15th century, to the left of the Gros-Pilier Tower and to the left of the Pont-Neuf.			
13	Chantre Tower	It is also called the corner tower of Saint-Pierre-la-Cour. The massive structure was seen in the late 1970s during works. The destruction dates from the 11th century, when the city was under Norman domination, during the extension works of the collegiate choir. (Note: Guilleux 2000, p. 100)			
D	Saint-Martin Gate (Note: Guilleux 2000, pp. 102–104)	The gate may have contained the Saint-Martin Chapel. It is partially preserved at No. 6 Place Saint-Pierre. The oldest medieval state of the building above it dates from the 11th–12th century. It was abandoned before the mid-13th century and replaced by a gate under the collegiate church. At the end of the 11th or early 12th century, the gate itself was abandoned in the late 13th or early 14th century. (Note: Guilleux 2000, pp. 115–116) Due to changes in the occupation level of Place Saint-Pierre, the gate became a postern in the Middle Ages. (Note: Guilleux 2000, p. 108) The building has not been studied "in detail."			Remains of the Porte Saint-Martin and modern building overlooking it.
14	Tower	Disappeared.			
15	Tower	Disappeared.			
16	Tower	The Roman tower is integrated into the medieval tower called Tour Vineuse and destroyed in 1832. Roman elements appeared during a collapse in 1976.			
17	Tower	Disappeared, like all its counterparts on the southern side of the enclosure.			
E	South gate	This gate, which would have been located at the entrance to the Grande-Rue, is not accepted by Joseph Guilleux in 2000.			
18	Tower	Disappeared, like all its counterparts on the southern side of the enclosure.			
19	Petit Saint-Pierre Tower	The shape is irregular. The ancient part is preserved at a height of 7 meters and is currently surmounted by a terrace.			Petit Saint-Pierre Tower.
F	Small postern	The postern, called Petit-Saint-Pierre in the mid-13th century, had a double brick archivolt. It was drawn by Georges Bouet but qualified as a "restoration attempt", (Note: Guilleux 2000, p. 216) in a very degraded state in the mid-1970s. Joseph Guilleux described the 1992 restoration as "unfortunate", with a "disastrous result, resulting in a pastiche." (Note: Guilleux 2000, pp. 108–109)			Current view of the Petite Poterne.
20	Oigny Tower	The upper part has collapsed, and the ancient part is preserved at 7.50 meters. The name comes from an 18th-century hotel that disappeared in 1919.			Oigny Tower without its upper parts.
21	School Tour	The name comes from the "Petites-Escoles de Saint-Benoît." The ancient building is covered except on the sides. The southern facade is preserved at 9 meters.			
22	Vivier Tower	The name comes from a fountain. The tower is over 14 meters high and has retained three openings that lead to a room communicating with the walkway. Another windowless room is located in the lower part. This lower room would be 3.20 meters deep. The Roman part, studied in 1959, measured 13.25 meters, a difference of more than 5 meters compared to the walkway.			General view of the Vivier Tower, seen from the left.
G	Grand postern	The postern was called Saint-Hilaire in 1245 and is "the only well-preserved one." It is 4.16 meters high and 2.60 meters wide. The round arch was transformed into a pointed arch. A now-sealed groove testifies to the presence of a door (Note: Guilleux 2000, p. 110) or a closure system with wooden leaves. The decoration of the arch measures 0.86 meters and includes bricks laid on the edge, canal tiles, and 3 rows of flat bricks separated after the first by a row of rubble.			View of the Grand postern from the country side.
23	Saint-Hilaire Tower	It is preserved by tear-off marks. The tower was supposed to protect the Grande Poterne. It may have belonged to an individual from the last third of the 14th century.			
24	Ardents Tower	The tower was mutilated in the 18th century during the construction of a private mansion. Only a lower room and the base of the ancient tower are preserved.			View of the hotel featuring the Ardents Tower, with the characteristic decor in the lower section.
25	Tucé Tower	The name comes from a 16th-century private mansion. The base measures 1.75 meters, and the ancient height with decoration is 7.80 meters. There is a blind lower room.			View of the Tucé Tower backing onto a town house.
26	Estang Tower	A "southern portion of its base" is preserved at a height of 3.75 meters. The tower was depicted by Louis Moullin in 1854 and was destroyed within the following three years.			The Gallo-Roman enclosure and the Estang tower on a watercolor by Louis Moullin dated 1854.
27	Tour of the tunnel	Excavations took place in the 1990s. The southern side, which connects it to the curtain enclosure, is broken over more than 5.70 meters, while the northern side retains 10 meters of Roman enclosure. The tower has settled on itself due to the moisture in the ground.			Tunnel tower, view from the left.
H	Tunnel postern	The postern displays evidence of grooves and holes that are consistent with a closure system. Before the mid-13th century, it was not used as a postern. It was subsequently rediscovered in 1953. Its dimensions are approximately 1.80 meters in width and 3.55 meters in height beneath the vault, with a passage measuring 4.20 meters in depth. It was initially regarded as a marine gate, however, this interpretation has since been invalidated due to the level of the Sarthe.			View of the Tunnel postern arch.
28	Hueau Tower	The tower was destroyed in the 1830s, and only a height of approximately 0.80 meters is currently preserved. Two drawings are extant: one by Arcisse de Caumont and the other by Richard Charles Hussey. The tower's radius was 3.50 meters, with a width of 7 meters, for a grip on the enclosure of approximately 5 meters. (Note: Guilleux 2000, pp. 183–184)			General view of the remains of the Hueau tower, with traces of the removal.
29	Madeleine Tower	The name is derived from a canon's house. The original height of the structure has been preserved at 14 meters. There are three windows in a room on the first floor, and another window is located on the second floor.			General view of the Madeleine Tower.
30	Pans-de-Gorron Tower	The tower, which is of "very high construction quality", is hexagonal and stands at a height of 10.50 meters at the curtain enclosure level. Each edge of the tower measures 3.75 meters in radius.			General view of the Pans-de-Gorron Tower.
I	Gourdaine postern	It is thought to have disappeared after the 17th century, with the site now occupied by Rue des Pans-de-Gorron. Remnants of this postern have been found, including bricks from the arch of the vault and blocks from the jambs.			Presumed remains of the Gourdaine postern.
31	Tower				
32	Gourdaine Tower	No longer exists today. It still existed in the 17th century, being owned by the city and later by the cathedral chapter, but it was destroyed the following century. The tower may have been linked to another hexagonal-shaped tower connected to a postern and might have adopted this shape.			
33	Rider's tower	A medieval structure exists from the early 15th century when a new gate was created for the castle. The Roman gate was either enveloped or reconstructed.			General view of the tower.

=== Decoration ===
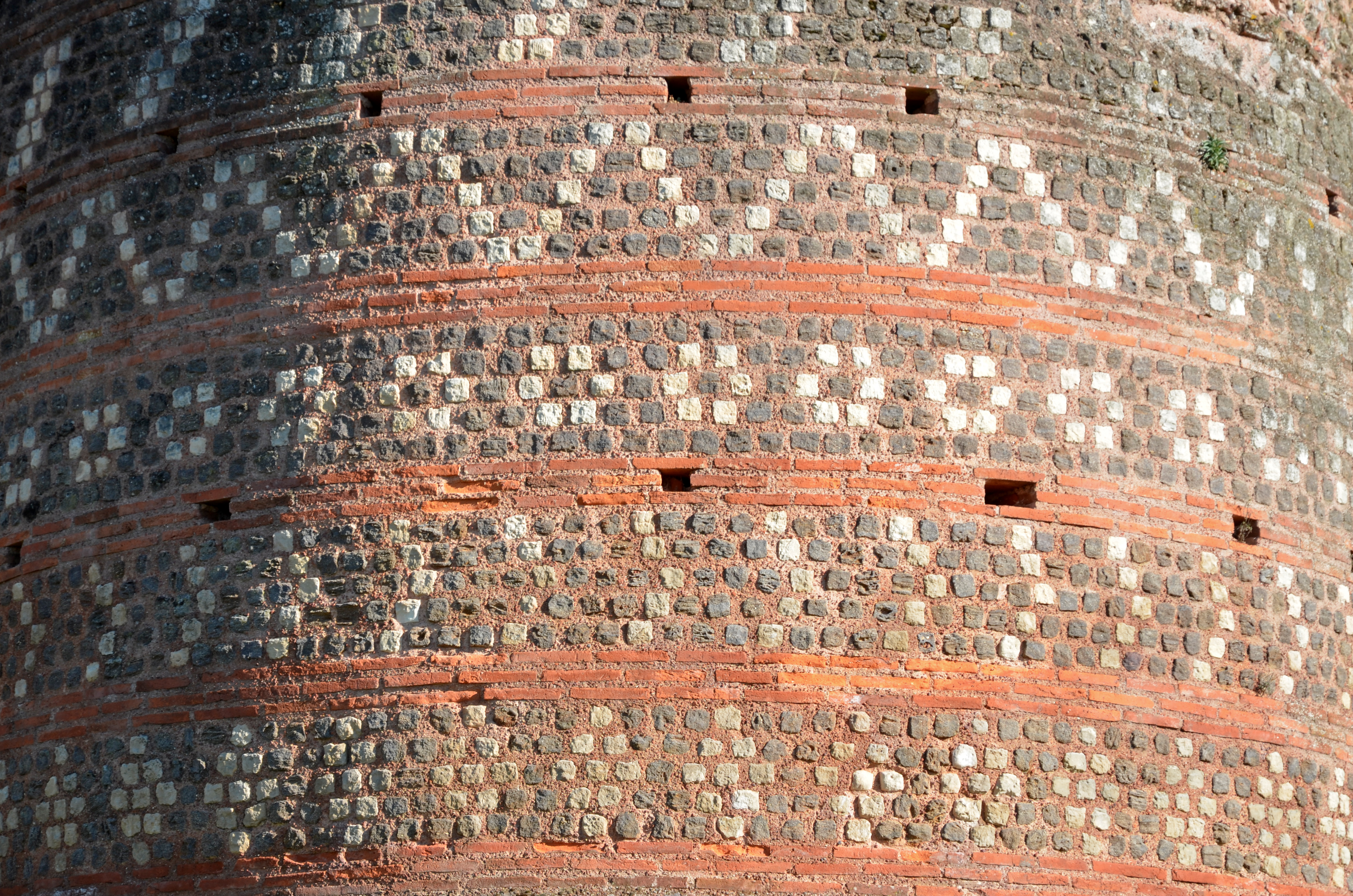
Exterior design of a tower.

==== General characteristics of the enclosure's decoration ====
The enclosure is characterized by an ochre hue, resulting from the use of red sandstone, known as "rousard stone", in alternating bands with lighter chalky limestone, red brick chainings, and pale pink mortar, rich in pulverized tile. The meticulously crafted geometric patterns reveal the architectural and artistic qualities of the designers and builders responsible for its construction. The enclosure features a distinctive and noteworthy decoration on its exterior facade, which has earned it the designation of the "archetype of urban enclosures from the late Antiquity." It should be noted, however, that the decoration is not continuous, with a section between Saint-Pierre-de-la-Cour and the Pont-Neuf remaining unadorned. (Note: Guilleux 2000, p. 193)

The inner face also lacks decoration "according to current observations."

==== Reused blocks ====
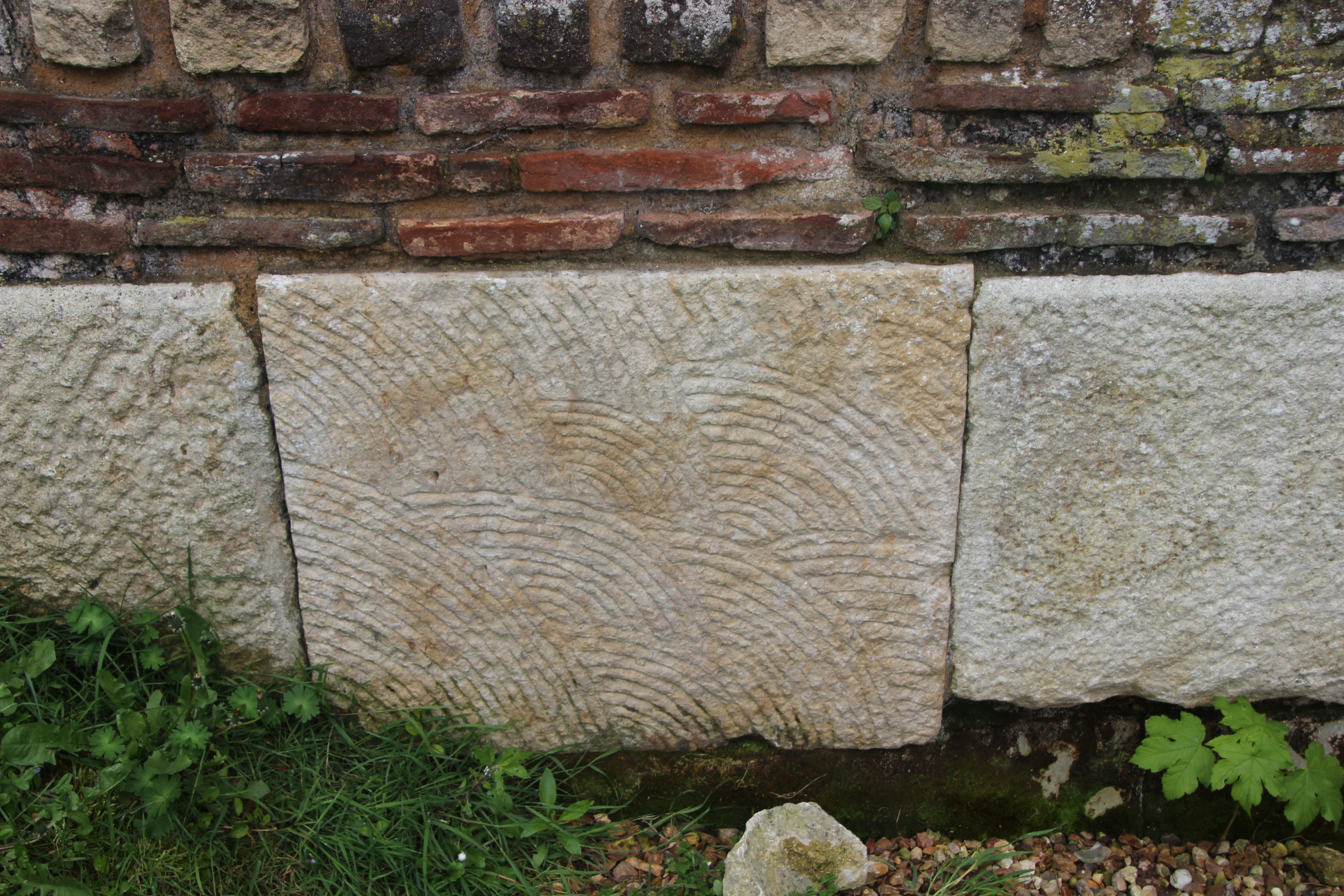
Detail of the base near the Madeleine tower, with carved reused blocks.

The decision to reuse the blocks at the base of the enclosure was made with careful consideration. The blocks were selected from the same structures, with consideration given to complementary sizes and circular arc decorations. The reused material forms one to three courses, with the elements in each section originating from the same building. In the interval between the Pans-de-Gorron tower and the Hueau tower, blocks carved with circular arcs were discovered in the 1950s. These sculpted elements were found over a distance of approximately one hundred meters. Some blocks bear carvings on their framing. (Note: Guilleux 2000, pp. 166–167) The carving is dated to the fourth century, as evidenced by similar elements found on other enclosures or Late antiquity sarcophagi. However, some hypotheses initially compared these blocks to those of the Gavrinis cairn.

The posterns are distinguished by their substantial ashlar jambs. The Grande-Poterne arch is the sole remaining example of its kind, exhibiting a discernible decorative scheme. (Note: Guilleux 2000, pp. 215–217)

==== External facing ====
The aesthetic intent is "even more spectacular" on the towers and curtain enclosures, with the polychromy present. Various shades of roussard sandstone, white limestone, and light sandstone are used along with bricks of various colors as well. The tile mortar gives a red color, which serves as a "dominant hue." The range of colors is broad, and the patterns are arranged in "regular courses."

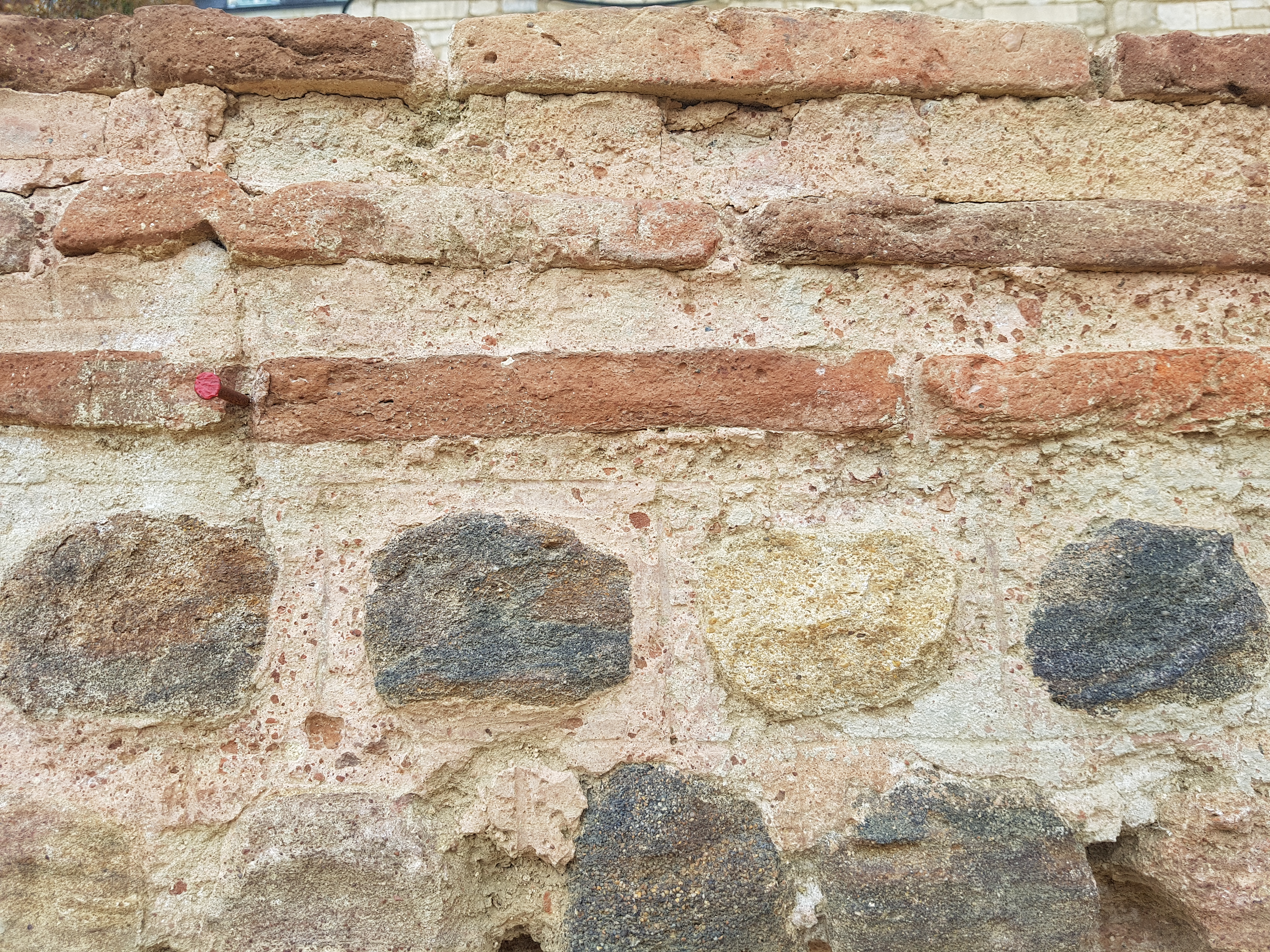
Iron-polished joints in the bishop's palace gardens.

The joints were meticulously ironed, and the patterns contributed to the overall aesthetic. The builders made precise marks on the joints to accentuate the appearance of regularity. The patterns were created by alternating limestone and sandstone rubble, and bricks. The patterns were either geometric or mixed compositions.

Joseph Guilleux identifies fourteen distinct patterns, (Note: Guilleux 2000, pp. 193–196) which are employed to "vary the decorative effects, break the repetitive monotony of the pattern, or fill a void." (Note: Guilleux 2000, pp. 210–213) The observed variety of decorations may be linked to some degree of autonomy of the teams in this area.

	Pattern type	Illustration
1	sowing (Note: Guilleux 2000, p. 200)	
2	horizontal lines of various types	
3	oblique lines of different types (Note: Guilleux 2000, p. 203)	Detail of the oblique line pattern.
4	sawtooth (Note: Guilleux 2000, pp. 203–204)	
5	V, sparse pattern, sometimes reversed	V-shaped pattern
6	arrowheads	
7	triangles, according to a "wide variety" (Note: Guilleux 2000, pp. 203–205)	Detail of the fishpond tower, featuring a register with a triangle motif.
8	dotted circles, a very common type of decoration on both the curtain wall and the towers (Note: Guilleux 2000, p. 205)	Dotted circle pattern.
9	semi-circles, often associated with triangles (Note: Guilleux 2000, p. 207)	
10	diamonds of different sizes	Diamond patterns.
11	hourglasses in different heights and either brown or light colors	Decor with hourglass motif
12	X, only present between the Tunnel poterne and the Hueau tower (Note: Guilleux 2000, p. 210)	
13	rafters	
14	columns, a rare motif that can be seen on the Oigny tower in particular	

==== Local tradition... but present elsewhere ====
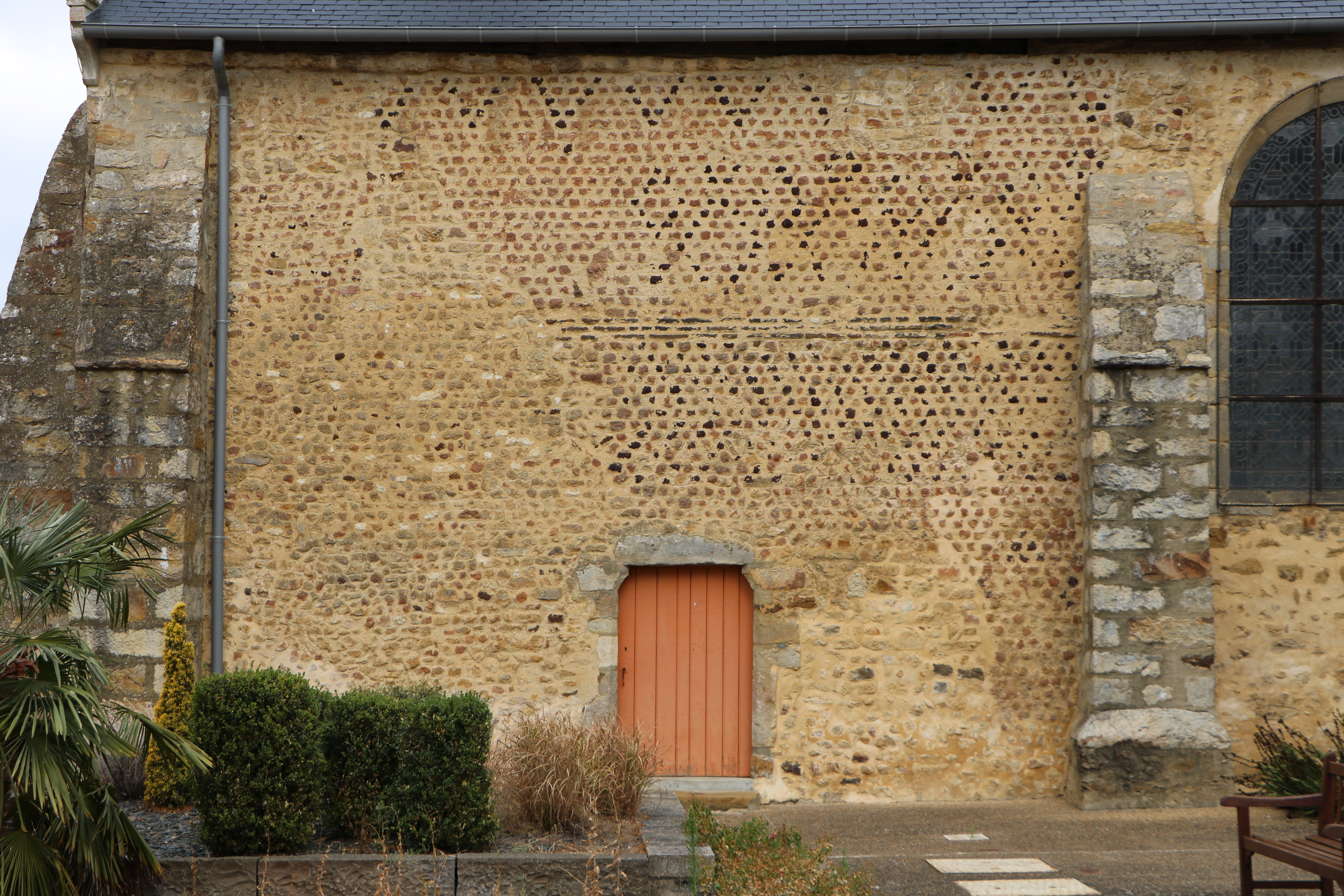
Roman wall of the Saint-Germain church in Savigné-l'Évêque.

The decoration is linked to a local construction tradition identified on the remains of a cultic structure discovered on the site of the Jacobins in Le Mans and dated to 15–20. This tradition is also evidenced in Aubigné-Racan, Savigny-l'Évêque, and on the site of a polygonal tower of a Roman villa in Juillé. (Note: Guilleux 2000, pp. 198–200) The tradition is linked to the use of the various rocks available to the Aulerci Cenomani, a variety linked to the geological peculiarity that the area occupies a "position at the interface" of the Armorican Massif and the Paris Basin.

The decoration is also present on other sites, albeit on a different scale. Examples include Nantes, Rennes, Jublains, as well as Mâcon, Bourges, and Die.

The use of local embellishments underscores the significance of local labor in the construction process. Joseph Guilleux posits that the local authorities exhibited a manifestation of local patriotism through the creation of a decorative element on a structure designated by the imperial authority.

== Between military use and degradations: The enclosure from the Middle Ages to the Modern Era ==
Plan of enclosures up to the Middle Ages: Gallo-Roman enclosure / 15th century / 14th century; Ditches 14th century / 13th century; 11th century / 16th century

=== Middle Ages ===
The history of the enclosure after Antiquity is a relatively recent area of research, with a significant increase in sources after the 14th century.

The enclosure was reclaimed for military purposes during various periods of unrest up until the 16th century, serving as a defensive structure against incursions by Breton raiders, Viking invaders, medieval armies, French forces during the Hundred Years' War, and Huguenot rebels during the Wars of Religion. (Note: Meunier 2022b, p. 120)

The function of the enclosure transformed during the medieval period. During the early Middle Ages, the enclosure fulfilled a defensive and symbolic role, (Note: Meunier 2022c, p. 133) with the gates serving to distinguish the city from the suburbs. (Note: Meunier 2022c, p. 130) By the end of the Middle Ages, the defensive function remained intact, while the enclosure also came to define the "territorial and legal framework" of the city. (Note: Augry & Meunier 2022b, p. 148)

Le Mans has been confirmed as a city with a long history of political and administrative roles, dating back fifteen centuries. It has served as a military prefecture, a seat of a bishopric, a seat of a county, and then as a continuously active administrative center until the 18th century. (Note: Guilleux 2000, p. 263)

==== Early Middle Ages ====
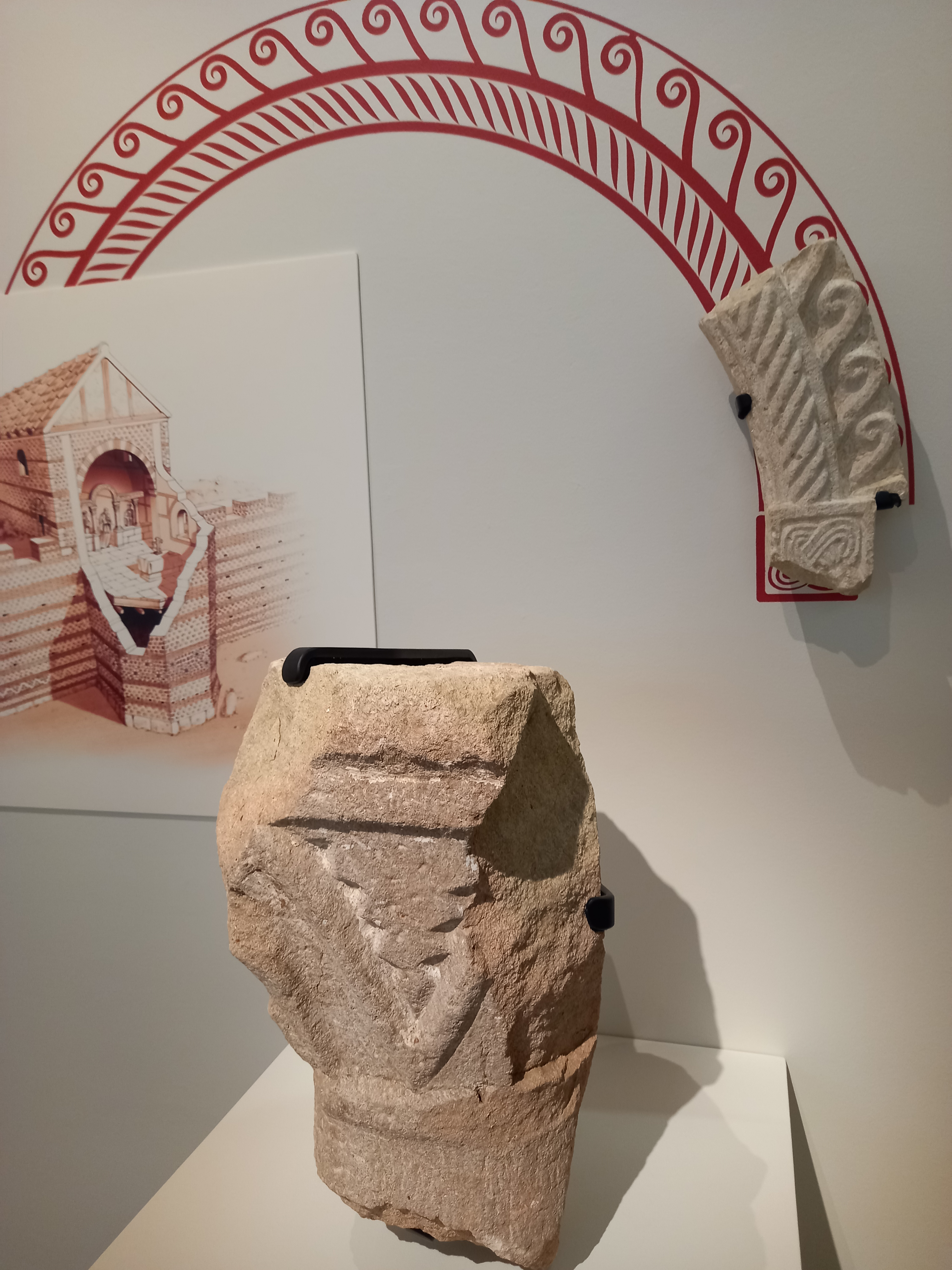
Lapidary remains of the Saint-Michel oratory, capital and arcade fragment, 9th–10th century. (Note: Fillion-Braguet 2022, pp. 136–137)

Despite the collapse of the Roman Empire in Gaul in 486, with the defeat of Syagrius by Clovis, Roman culture persisted in the following century. The Roman enclosure retained its significance as the city became the seat of a county and subsequently a duchy from the 7th century. (Note: Meunier 2022c, p. 128) The maintenance of the enclosure was probably assumed by the bishop, who served as "the principal relay of royal authority" from the early Middle Ages onwards. (Note: Meunier 2022b, p. 121)

The area surrounding the enclosure was found to contain many scattered burials, situated close to the cathedral and the town hall. This observation marks a notable shift from the traditional practice of burial outside the boundaries of urban settlements. (Note: Meunier 2022c, p. 132)

Some towers were transformed into oratories, and churches were constructed against the enclosures for reasons of "ostentatious and symbolic" importance, in addition to the "lack of space." The women's monastery of Saint-Aubin, which dates from the 7th century, was located in a tower situated near the city gate and the cathedral. (Note: Guilleux 2000, pp. 101–102) Two additional oratories, that of Saint-Pierre and that of Saint-Martin, may also have been situated in towers, a circumstance that is reflective of the situation in many other cities. The towers were likely to serve as hostels for pilgrims, providing them with a secure place of rest. (Note: Meunier 2022c, pp. 131–132)

The decision to establish the cathedral at its final location was likely made in the 5th century, at the highest point of the enclosed city. This location was strategically selected to protect the episcopal groups, who were situated within the city walls. The will of Bishop Bertrand of Le Mans, dated March 616, mentions an oratory dedicated to Saint Michael in a tower, which was likely constructed at this time.

During this period, the Count of Maine consolidated his authority in opposition to the bishop. The enclosures of Le Mans served as a "framework for the development of urban life" and symbolized a place of power. Both authorities settled on the enclosures facing the Isaac Valley, which raises questions about a possible conscious connection to the continuity of Roman power. The bishop relocated in the 11th–12th centuries from the vicinity of the Saint-Michel tower to the northeast side of the enclosures, which were not far from the cathedral's transept.

The palace of the Counts of Maine was erected on the "probable site" of the forum. The collegiate church of Saint-Pierre-de-la-Cour was constructed near the Saint-Martin gate.

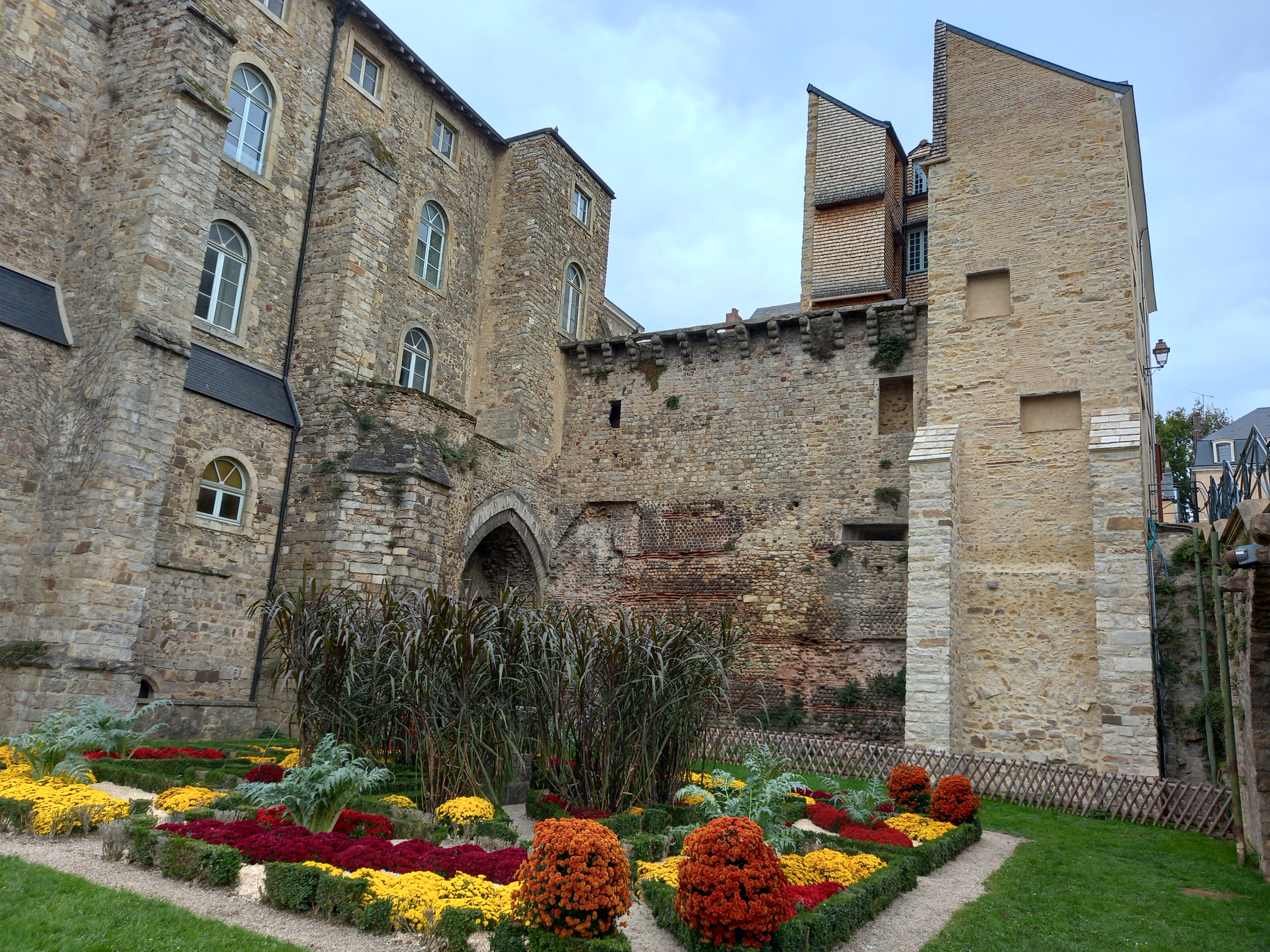
General view of the Jardin Pierre-de-Ronsard.

The Roman enclosures then served as a "framework for the development of urban life and (...) a symbol of the city as a place of power."

Charles the Bald, the Duke of Maine who became King of the Franks in 856, temporarily transferred the ducal command to his son Louis the Stammerer and restored the enclosures in 869 to reinforce the city's defenses against incursions by the Bretons and Normans. Le Mans was pillaged by the Bretons in 844 and 850, and by the Vikings allied with the Bretons in 865–866. In response, Charles the Bald ordered restoration work to be carried out, as he had done in Tours and Reims.

==== From the 11th century to the 14th century ====
The region of Le Mans was the subject of intense competition and conflict, leading to the outbreak of numerous rebellions. In 1062, William of Normandy, who would later become known as the Conqueror, assumed control. He constructed two mounds at Montbarbet and a substantial tower on the northern side of the enclosures, using the Roman rampart like that seen in Rouen and London. (Note: Augry & Meunier 2022b, p. 142) Additionally, he authorized the demolition of a tower to facilitate the expansion of the collegiate church.

The Roman enclosures became the focal point of power during the medieval period, both in terms of religious and political authority. This shift may have been driven by the new authorities' desire to align themselves with the legacy of the Roman Empire.

The enclosures were not modified during the 12th–13th centuries. (Note: Augry & Meunier 2022b, p. 144) Their continued utility was confirmed during the Middle Ages, even though they underwent partial destruction and numerous restorations of questionable historical accuracy.

The city was besieged in 1100 by Elias I of Maine and then by Philip Augustus in 1189. (Note: Augry & Meunier 2022b, pp. 142–143) In 1217, Philip Augustus authorized the destruction of a portion of the enclosures to rebuild the cathedral's choir in the Gothic style. The enclosures around the cathedral were integrated into the ecclesiastical complex in the first quarter of the 15th century.

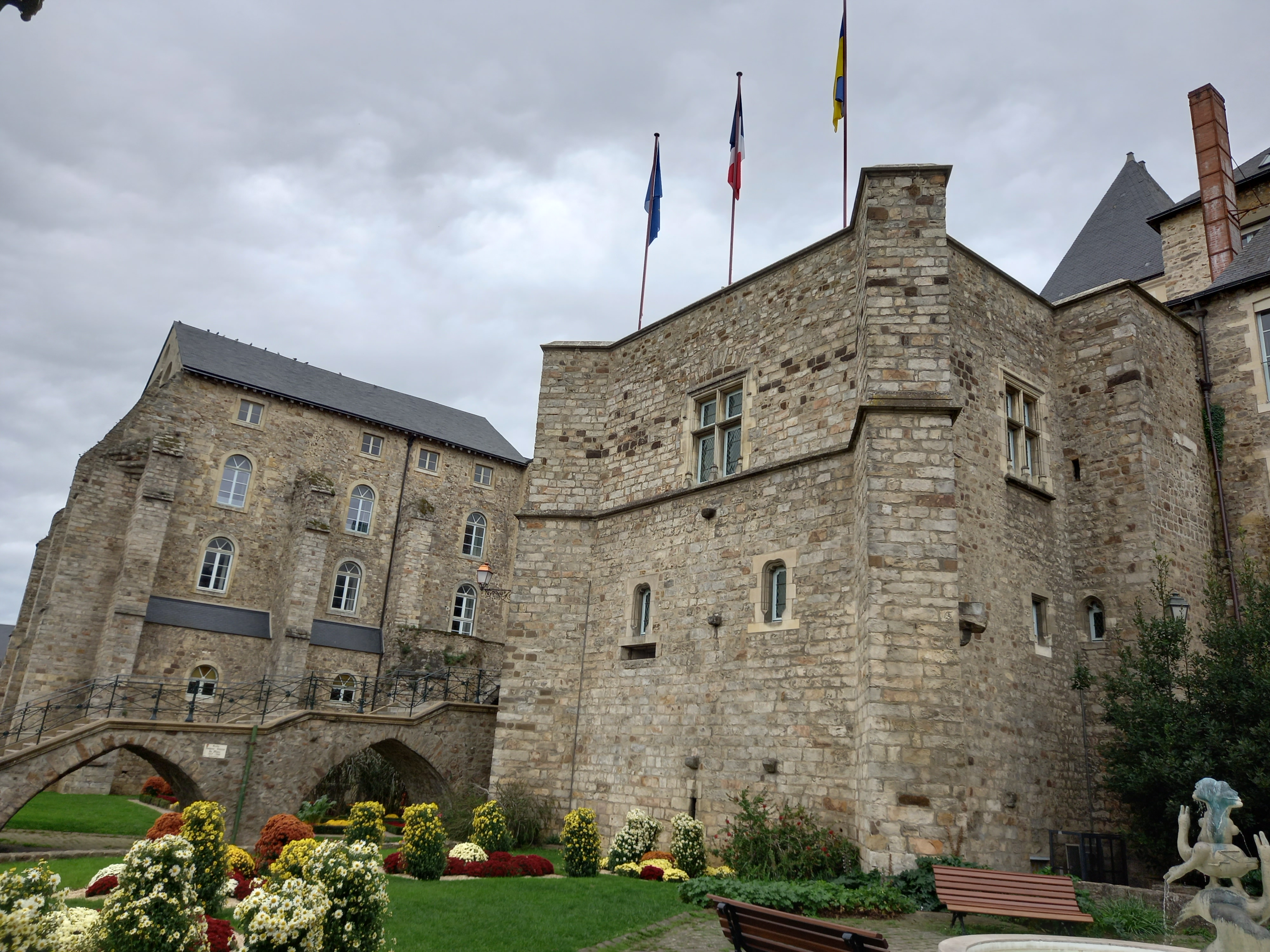
In the right foreground, the Gros-Pilier tower, built in the late 14th century.

The enclosures underwent modifications during the Hundred Years' War due to the prevailing sense of insecurity that followed the capture of King John the Good at the Battle of Poitiers in 1356. These modifications included the addition of machicolations and towers, as well as the construction of supplementary enclosures to safeguard the city's suburbs. In addition, the environs of the enclosures underwent modification in the wake of the advent of artillery. A ditch, measuring 25 meters in width and reaching depths of up to 5 meters, was constructed. (Note: Augry & Meunier 2022b, pp. 144–145) Earth was employed in the formation of a rampart encircling the cathedral and the erection of an auxiliary enclosure, encompassing a new tower and alterations to the Saint-Michel tower. In the vicinity of the Sarthe, a 600-meter-long enclosure was established. (Note: Augry & Meunier 2022b, pp. 145–146) This enclosure, situated in the tannery district, effectively doubled the ancient rampart. (Note: Meunier 2022a, p. 158)

In the period between 1370 and 1380, Louis I, Duke of Anjou, constructed a new residence beyond the enclosure, a structure designated as the Gros-Pilier Tower. The Ponts-Neufs staircase was constructed concurrently with the aforementioned alterations, while the Roman curtain enclosure was elevated by over five meters. (Note: Augry & Meunier 2022b, p. 146) During the fourteenth century, the Fossés-Saint-Pierre enclosures were reinforced with the addition of towers and turrets. The tower erected by William's order was reinforced and incorporated into an enclosure. Despite these modifications, the ancient enclosure retained its status as a significant component of the system.

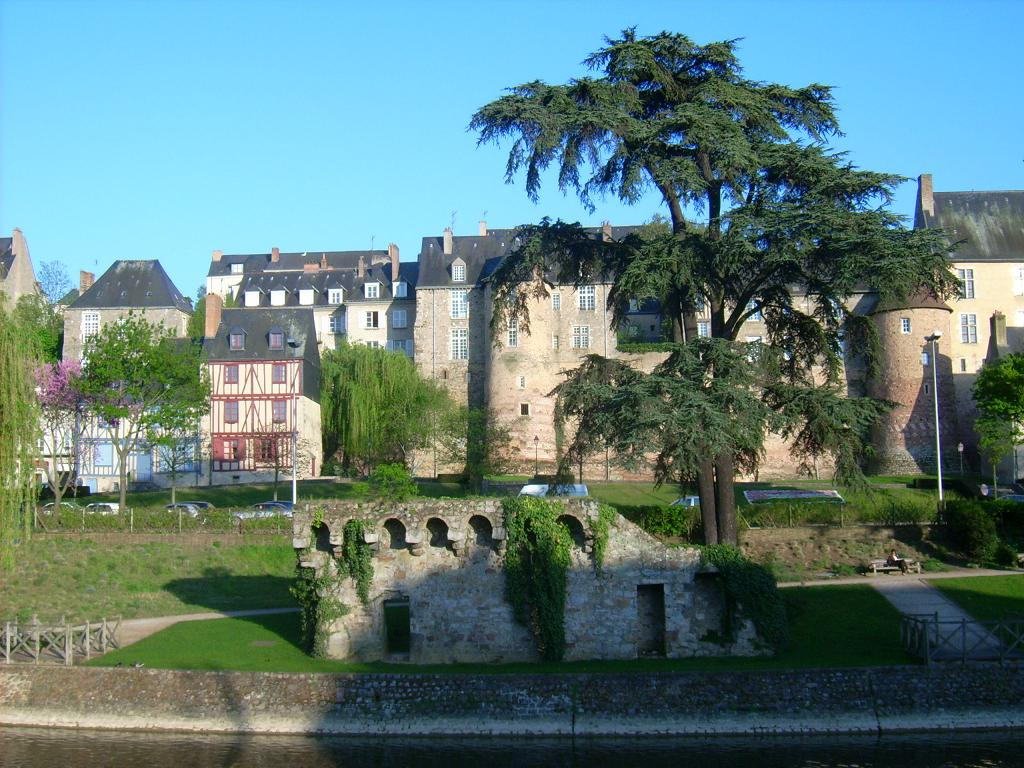
The enclosure with a section of the double wall, the medieval Tanneries wall in the foreground and the Roman wall in the background.

In periods of peace, the enclosures were not maintained, and buildings were constructed against them. The habitat approached the ancient enclosures, including the canonical houses of the 12th and 13th centuries, particularly that of Saint-Bertrand. A medieval window is present in the Madeleine Tower. Limestone foundation blocks, reused in construction, were stolen during this period, resulting in the weakening of the structure and subsequent deterioration.

The Tucé Hotel is primarily a late 15th-century structure, although evidence suggests it may have been erected earlier. The Tucé tower, which is still standing, was originally used as a chapel and a room. It features faux ashlar decoration that is stylistically consistent with the 13th–14th centuries. The Saint-Martin gate was bestowed upon the chapter of the collegiate church of Saint-Pierre-de-la-Tour circa 1170–1180. (Note: Augry & Meunier 2022b, pp. 146–147) The ditches on Fossés-Saint-Pierre Street were occupied by dense housing in the 13th–14th centuries, inhabited by wealthy families according to the artifacts found during excavations in the 1980s. Similarly, excavations near the cathedral and the Jet d'eau yielded comparable findings. (Note: Augry & Meunier 2022b, pp. 147–148) The subdivision of the ditches was "undoubtedly" a comital decision intended to generate income.

=== Modern Era ===
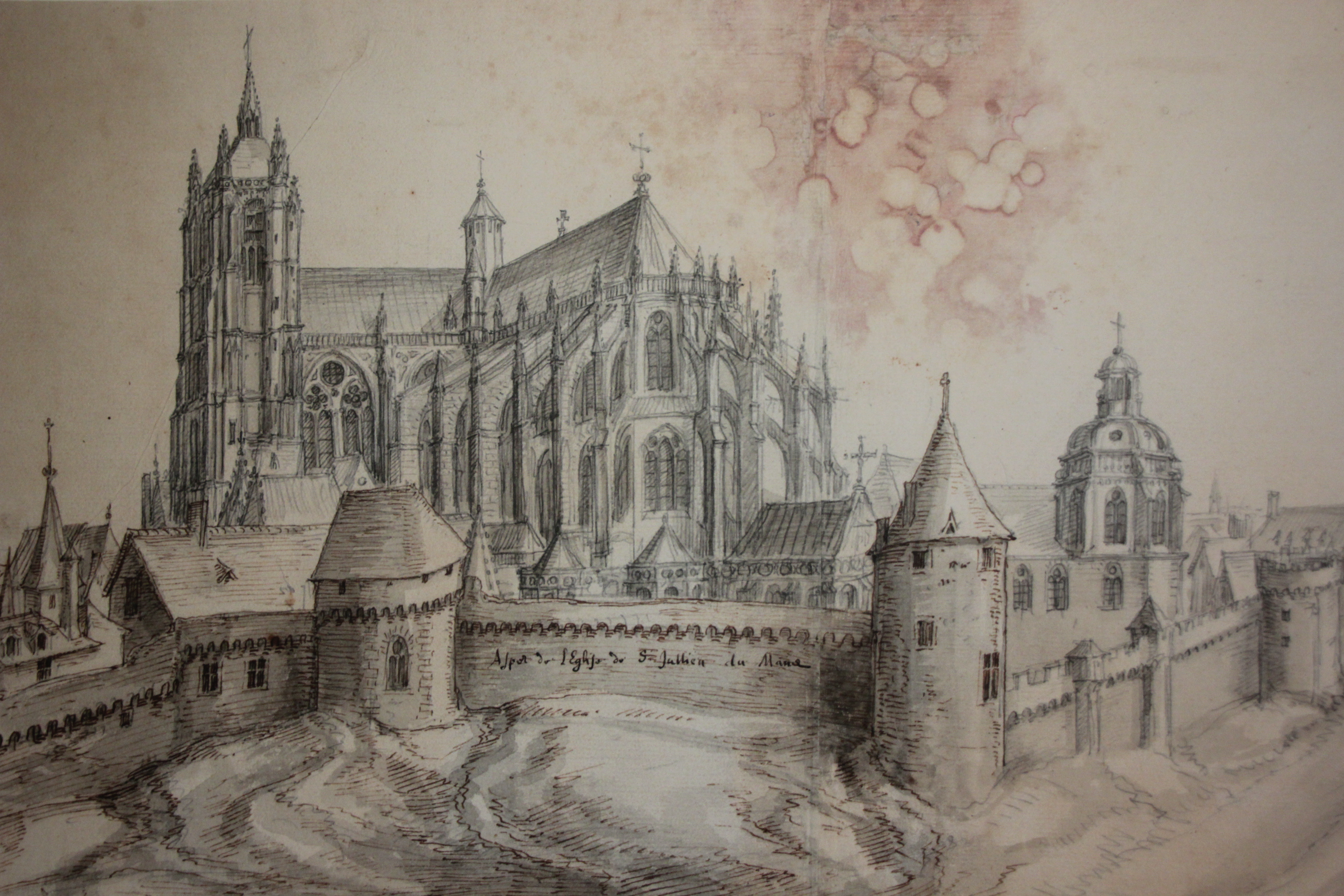
Partial view of the engraving entitled Aspect de l'Église de Saint Jullien du Mans le 8 janvier 1624 et Achevée le 4 juillet 1637, drawing by Martellange Étienne (1569–1641).

The population of the city exhibited a surge at the outset of the 14th century, a second wave around 1560, and a third during the mid-18th century. During this period, ditches were constructed and "often affluent" houses were erected on the enclosures. These structures, which were not used during peacetime, were no longer maintained and some elements were leased. The Grande Poterne retained its function. (Note: Bertrand & Salin 2022, p. 188)

From the late 15th century, municipal charters granted the aldermen control over the enclosures, confirmed by a royal decree in 1687: the towers were then used for city council meetings, one of which is attested in 1489, or for other public uses, while others were rented out to residents. The royal administration of the seneschal's office noted poor maintenance of the enclosures in 1671, and an inspection was organized in the presence of city representatives; despite the recommendations, the enclosures continued to deteriorate, as noted in 1772. (Note: Meunier 2022a, pp. 158–159)

Some sections of the enclosures were still under the ownership of religious institutions, including the Saint-Martin gate, which was topped with a "luxurious residence" in the 18th century. The towers on the Sarthe side frequently belonged to private mansions. (Note: Meunier 2022a, pp. 159–160)

The enclosures underwent modifications and reinforcement during the Wars of Religion, enabling their adaptation to accommodate artillery. Following the Fronde of the 17th century, the military use of the enclosures was abandoned. Instead, the interior enclosures were destroyed, and defenses were constructed along the kingdom's borders under the direction of Richelieu and Louis XIII. This strategy was designed to limit the potential for revolts. The tower of William the Conqueror, constructed in 1063 and subsequently serving as the city's castle, was demolished in 1617, along with sections of the Roman enclosures. The materials from these structures were repurposed, and the resulting space was cleared (subsequently becoming the Place du Cardinal Grente). A tower was destroyed in 1633. (Note: Meunier 2022a, p. 160) In 1683, the backfilling of the northwest corner by the canons resulted in the collapse of the enclosure over a length of approximately 50 meters, leading to the destruction of the buildings situated below, including the Church of Gourdaine.

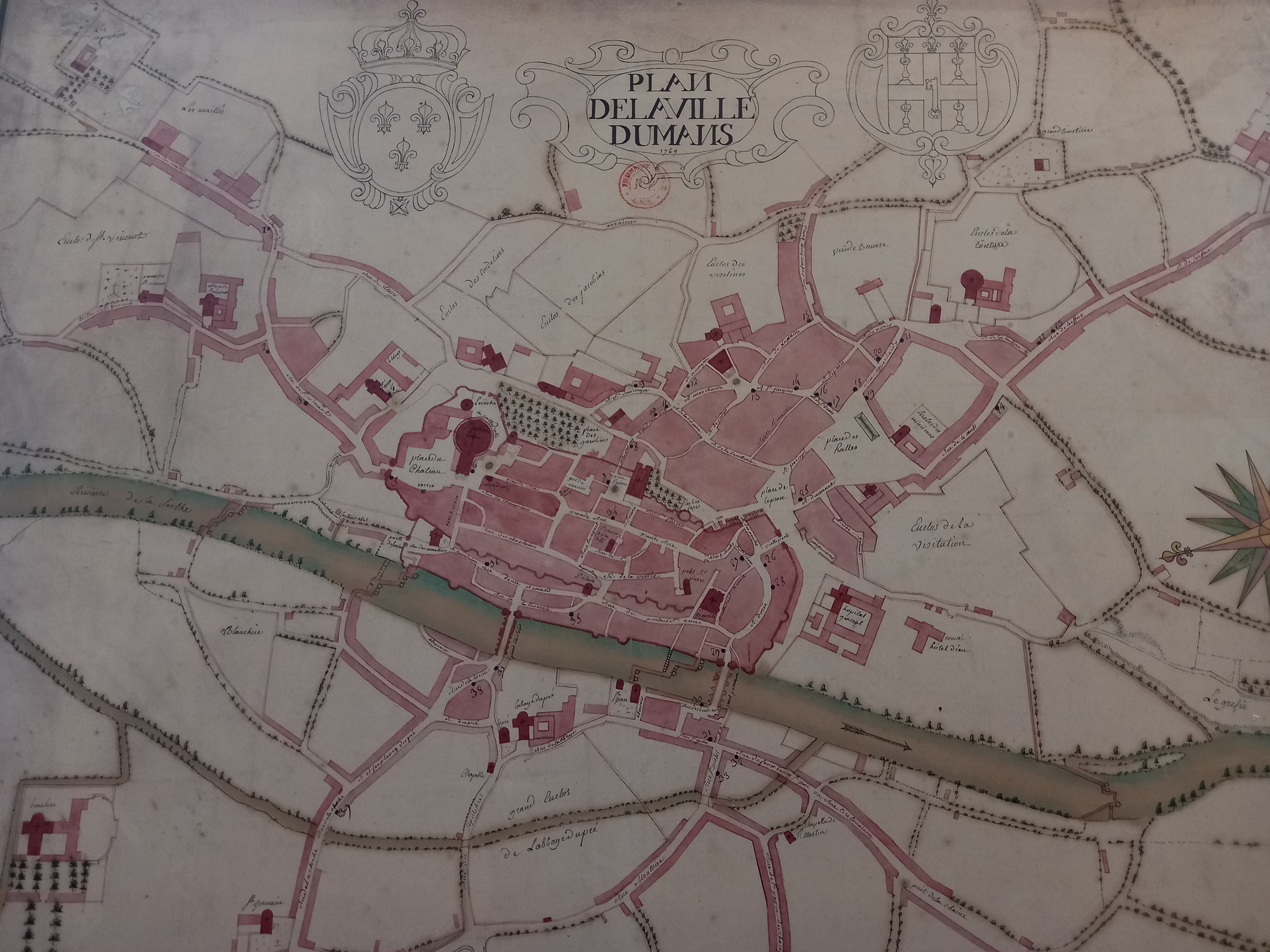
Map of the city of Le Mans in 1769, with the city spilling out of its successive enclosures as a result of the town planning activity of the period.

The period between 1680 and 1690 represents a significant shift in municipal policy, marked by the filling in of ditches and the destruction of fortified structures dating back to the 15th and 16th centuries. On 20 February 1696, the ownership of the building was formally transferred to the city by decree of Louis XIV.

The objective was to enhance the urban landscape by establishing new public spaces and improving mobility. This involved the construction of new thoroughfares and the erection of commercial establishments, including a market, fish market, and butcher's shop. Additionally, a staircase was constructed, which later became known as the Boucheries staircase. In 1688, the Margot Tower was transferred to the bishop for use in the Bishopric of Paris.

The work was completed in the early 18th century, yet urban development continued until the end of the century. In 1776–1778, the Fayau and Engoufer towers, which were in a state of disrepair and at risk of collapse, were demolished. Throughout this period of significant urban transformation, the Roman enclosures were preserved due to their function as retaining enclosures for the upper city (Note: Bertrand 2022c, p. 176) and their integration with residential and religious buildings.

== Between abandonment, studies, and valorization: The enclosure from the 19th to the 21st centuries ==
=== Abandonment ===
The demographic growth of Le Mans was considerable between 1830 and 1848. During this period, the city invested in significant infrastructure and undertook extensive efforts to clean up the banks of the Sarthe. (Note: Bertrand 2022b, p. 174) The decoration of the enclosures was covered by plaster. The Hueau tower, which was drawn in 1830, was demolished by the owner, who sought to expand his property.

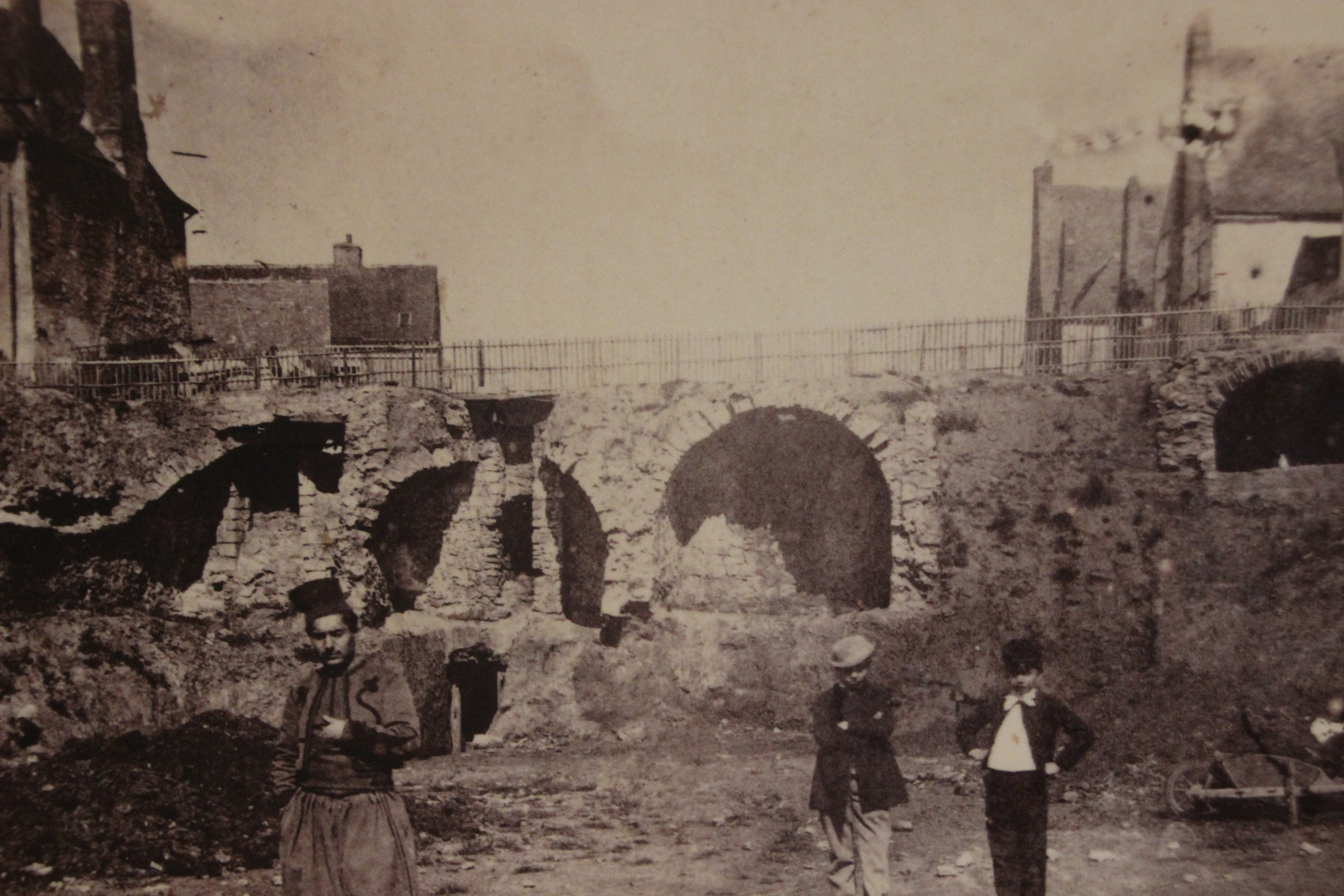
Early photograph, circa 1870, showing the tunnel work.

A gallery was inaugurated at the end of the 1840s, opening in 1851, but closed in 1857. To facilitate the construction of a staircase leading to the Place des Jacobins, sections of the gallery were demolished between 1853 and 1854.

A new project, comprising a tunnel and an open road, was proposed by Eugène Caillaux to connect the right bank of the Sarthe to the rest of the city. The project was adopted in 1872 and completed in 1877. (Note: Bertrand 2022c, pp. 176–177) Historians, including Edward Augustus Freeman, protested against the project, but a 20-meter opening was created using dynamite. (Note: Bertrand 2022c, p. 177)

The housing and craftsmanship surrounding the enclosure remained dense, and the area was unhealthy. Landslides affected the building between the late 19th century and the 20th century, resulting in structural damage.

=== Studies and hazards ===
==== From origins to the late 19th century ====
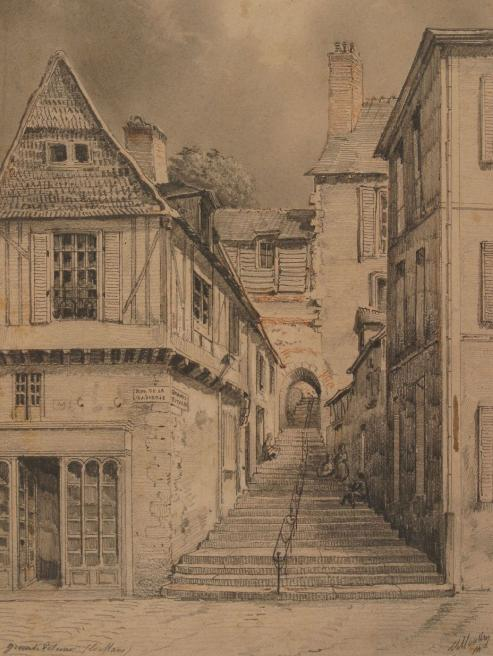
Drawing of the Grand Postern by Louis Moullin, circa 1854

The documentation on the enclosure increased significantly after the fourteenth century. The interest in antiquity that emerged in France in the sixteenth century (Note: Meunier & Monteil 2022a, p. 162) reached the city around 1540, according to François Grudé. Louis Maulny (circa 1681–1765), a counselor at the Presidial of his state, was the first true historian to study the building, describing it and dating it to the Roman Empire. (Note: Meunier & Monteil 2022a, pp. 162–163)

The initial substantial contribution by local scholars can be traced back to the latter half of the 18th century. Pierre Renouard (1744–1825) conducted a detailed archaeological investigation of the remains of Allonnes and the enclosure, employing rigorous scientific methods and making "genuine archaeological observations." (Note: Meunier & Monteil 2022a, p. 163) During the same period, and particularly in the 19th century, a plethora of representations of the city emerged, predominantly in the form of paintings. (Note: Bertrand & Hirardot 2022a, p. 167) However, the enclosure was largely obscured from view. It was employed in various construction projects, serving as a supporting structure for curtain enclosures, while the towers were repurposed with slate roofs. The enclosure was partially obscured by an artisanal district of tanners and mills, and the surrounding area was characterized by poor sanitation. (Note: Bertrand & Hirardot 2022b, p. 166)

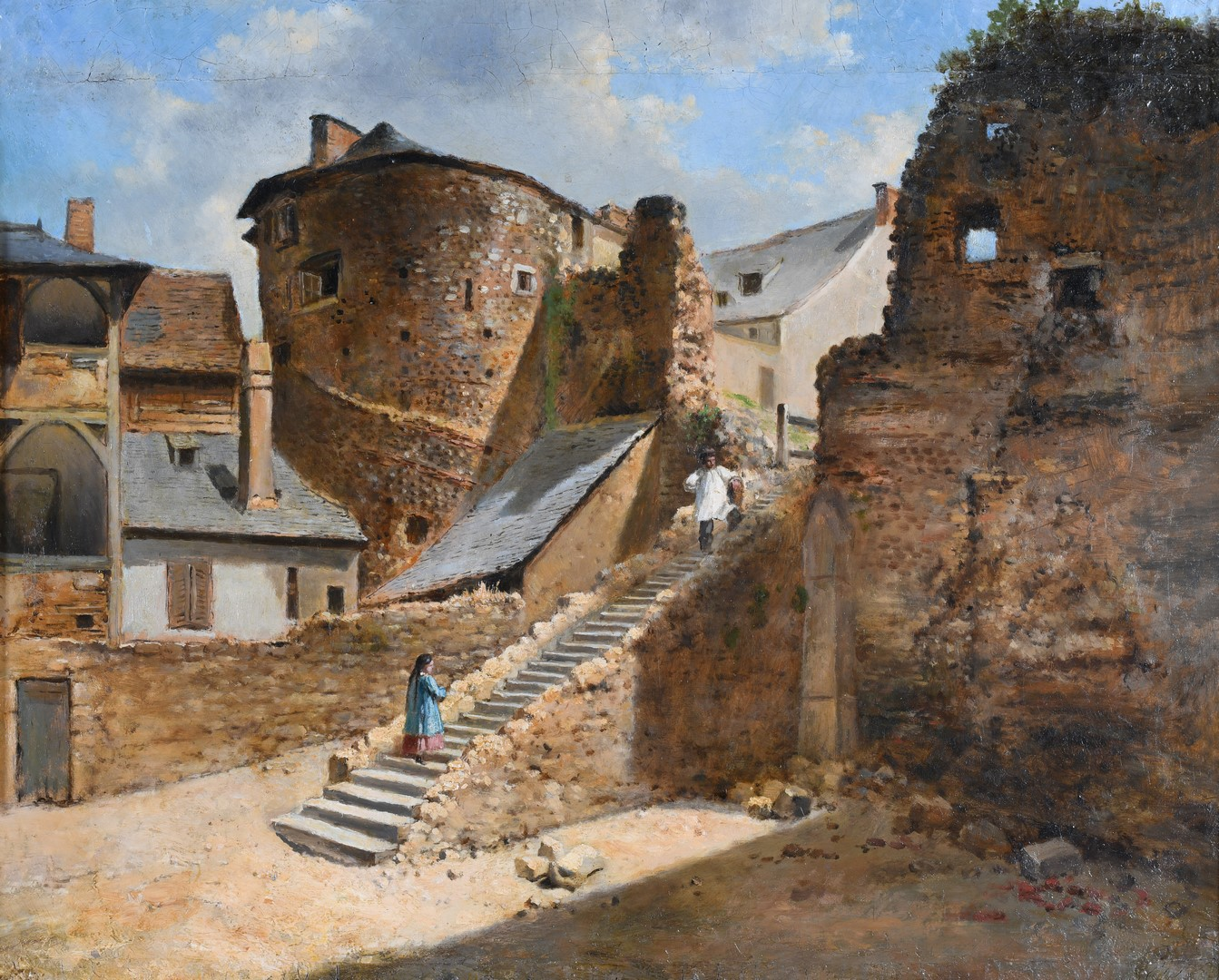
The Gallo-Roman enclosure before the tunnel was built, Georges Crinier, 1869, Musée du Mans.

The Roman enclosure was subjected to extensive study by scholarly societies and historians during the nineteenth century. (Note: Bertrand 2022e, p. 180) The enclosure was the subject of particular scrutiny by Arcisse de Caumont, a prominent figure in the field of archaeology, beginning in 1826. His findings were subsequently published in Cours d'antiquités monumentales in 1830. Local antiquarians began representing old buildings from the 1830s, following the destructions associated with the French Revolution. (Note: Bertrand & Hirardot 2022a, p. 168) A "genuine enthusiasm" surrounded the building, and the city hosted a congress of the French Archaeological Society as early as 1836. Following a report by Prosper Mérimée in 1850, (Note: Bertrand 2022e, p. 181) the Roman enclosure was classified as a historical monument in 1862. In the same century, the medieval enclosure was largely destroyed due to urban development.

Louis Moullin created approximately one hundred drawings in 1854, some of which serve as valuable testimonies due to the significant alterations that occurred in their surrounding areas in the subsequent decades. These changes were largely influenced by the construction of the tunnel and the Jet d'eau staircase in the cathedral area. (Note: Bertrand & Hirardot 2022a, pp. 168–169) Moullin's works reflect an "aesthetic and sensitive approach" that is not devoid of a desire for picturesque representation. (Note: Bertrand & Hirardot 2022a, p. 170)

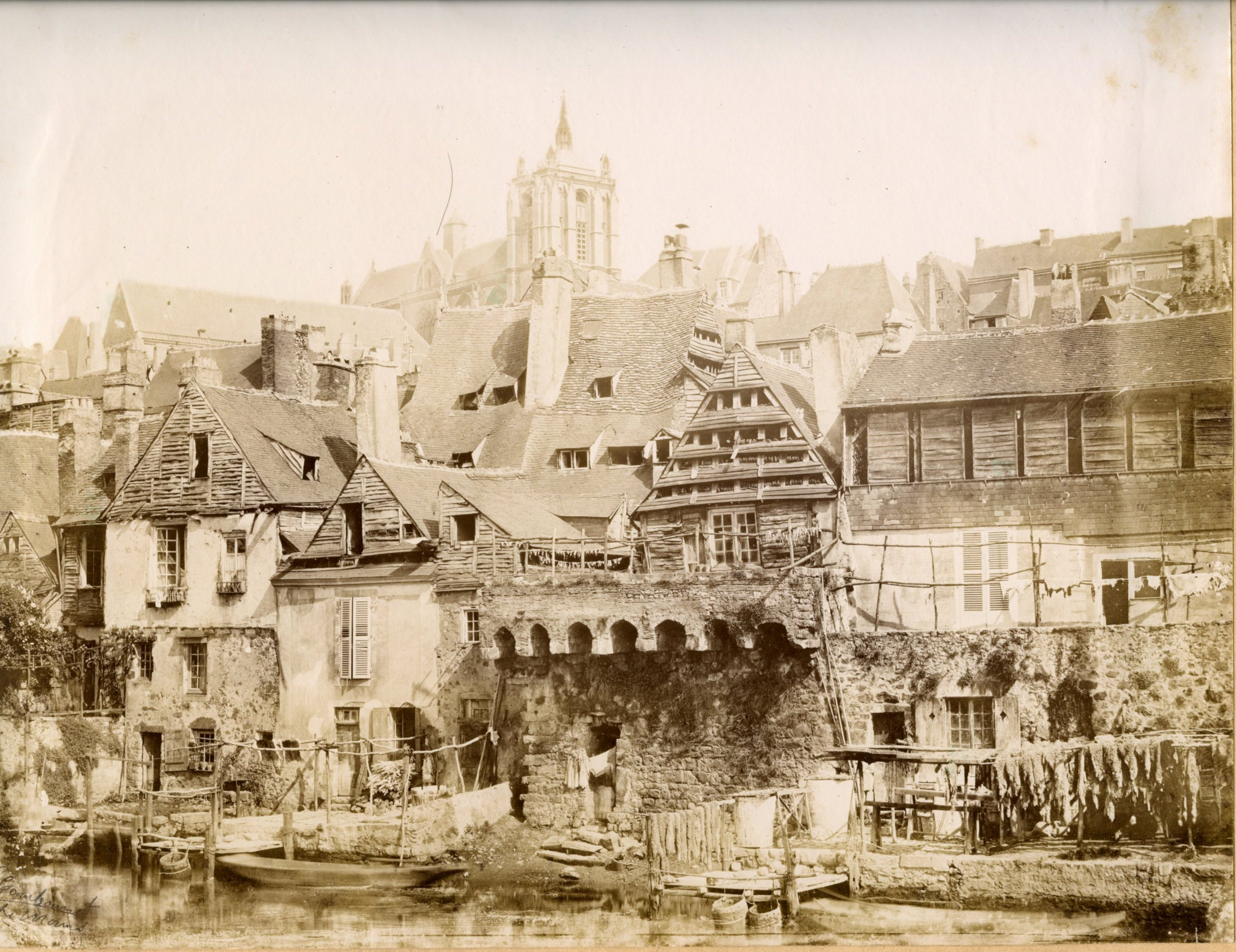
Tannery district in the early 20th century.

The practice of photography emerged in the 1850s, and by the 1870s-1880s, it had become a commissioned service of the city's archaeological museum. The photographs document significant changes in the city and destruction, although only those by Gatien Chaplain-Duparc document the excavations carried out during the major tunnel works. (Note: Bertrand & Hirardot 2022a, p. 169) Georges Crinier depicted the area that was to be destroyed by the tunnel in 1869; however, the representation of the Roman enclosure was not a subject in itself. (Note: Bertrand & Hirardot 2022a, p. 171)

In the early 20th century, postcards sometimes contained captions that were not entirely accurate. For example, the Roman enclosure was described as "almost invisible to both painters and residents", while the medieval remains of the tanners' quarter were highlighted.

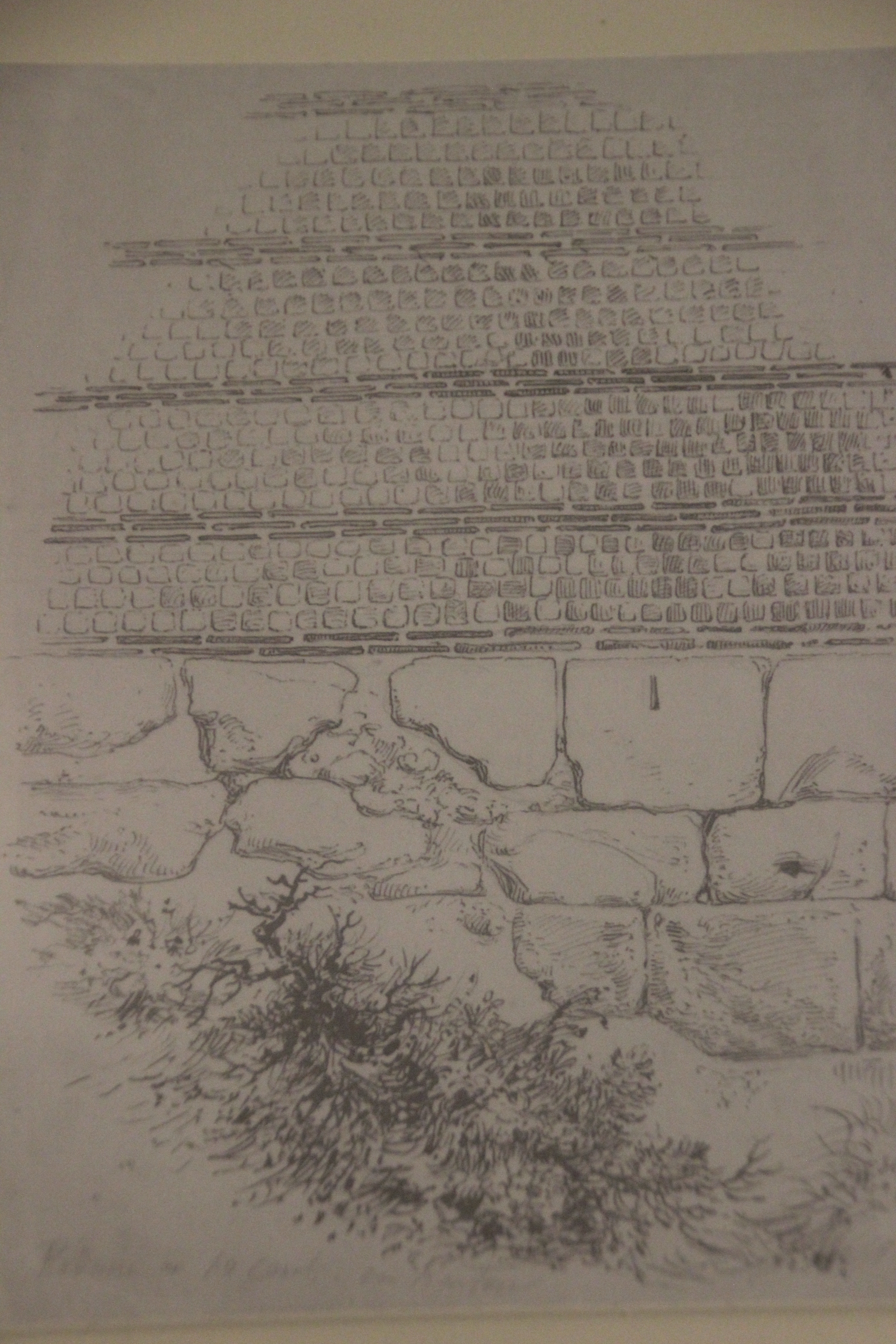
Large boulders and small machines near the Grande Poterne, Georges Bouet.

In the latter half of the nineteenth century, scholars such as Georges Bouet, Robert Triger, and Adrien Blanchet commenced efforts to describe and study the building. Subsequently, Blanchet conducted a comparative analysis of the enclosures, concurrently examining numismatics and epigraphy, and concluded that they were constructed during the latter decades of the 3rd century. In the 19th century, authors proposed a date range for the enclosure spanning the 3rd to the 6th century, with the majority of them placing it within the 3rd to the early 4th century. Georges Bouet produced over thirty drawings for a publication on the enclosure, which was subsequently authored by Robert Charles in 1881. Robert Charles exercised considerable caution in dating the enclosure, situating its construction between the second half of the 3rd century and the death of Emperor Julian in 363. (Note: Guilleux 2000, p. 247) The enclosure was described and its history was studied from the 1850s onwards within the framework of scholarly societies and journals.

The structural failures of portions of the enclosure resulted in legal proceedings between residents and the municipality to secure the implementation of safety measures. One such instance occurred following the collapse of a section on Rue de la Porte Sainte-Anne in 1887, precipitated by precipitation. Another trial took place in 1893. These disputes resulted in judicial defeats for the city, which was determined by the courts to be the proprietor. (Note: Bertrand 2022c, pp. 177–178)

==== From the early 20th century to the early 21st century ====
===== Awareness and first restorations: up to the 1970s =====
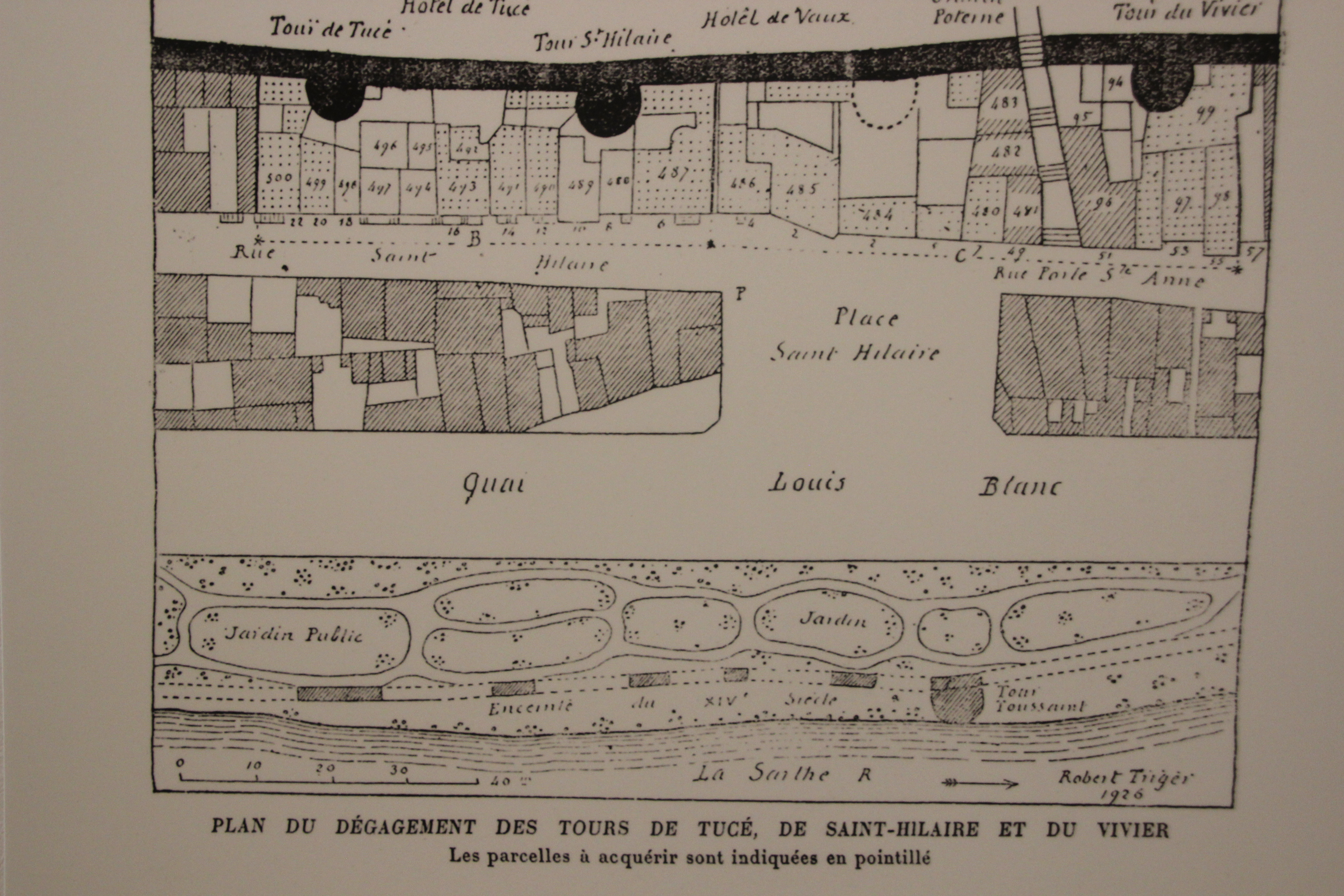
Plan for clearing the Tucé, Saint-Hilaire and Vivier towers, Robert Triger, 1926.

The city commenced monitoring and maintaining the enclosure in the early decades of the 20th century. (Note: Bertrand 2022c, p. 178) This awareness was largely due to the efforts of Robert Triger, who called on the press and specialists (Note: Bertrand 2022e, pp. 181–182) from 1907 to 1910. (Note: Bertrand & Salin 2022, p. 189) To facilitate access to the monument, the municipalities initiated a program to acquire the surrounding houses, beginning in the 1910s (Note: Bertrand 2022e, p. 182) and continuing into the 1920s and 1930s. This program aimed to demolish substandard housing and develop tourism. Subsequently, the enclosure was incorporated into the city's tourist promotion efforts, as evidenced by a 1935 poster from the Automobile Club de l'Ouest and the Sarthe Tourist Office. This partial clearance was completed in 1926.

Some towers were restored, including the Tunnel Tower in 1953 and the Vivier Tower in 1969. The latter was monitored and shored up from 1949, yet deterioration in other parts of the building persisted. (Note: Bertrand 2022c, pp. 178–179)

The enclosure was cleared and accompanied by scientific studies, which yielded discoveries. One such discovery was the tunnel postern, which was published in the journal Gallia in 1953. In response to the need for the preservation of the building, local preservation associations were formed and contributed to the protection of the structure. (Note: Bertrand & Salin 2022, p. 190)

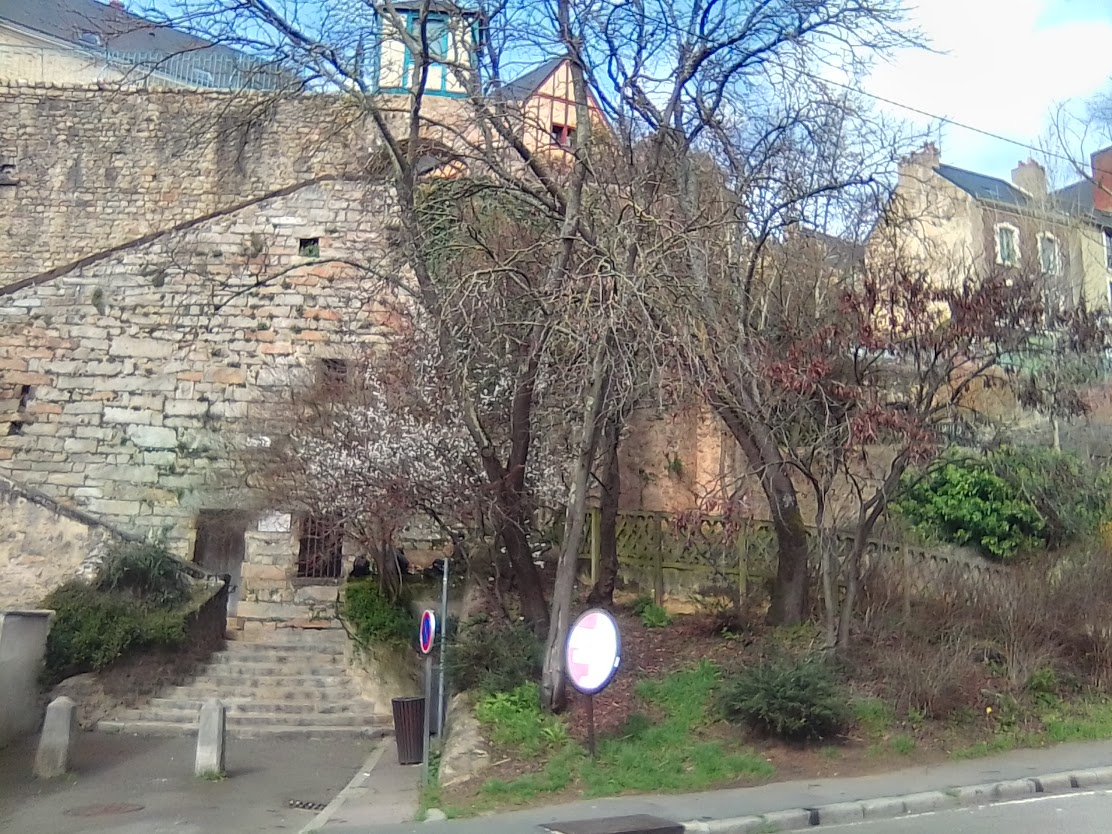
Wall on rue des Fossés Saint-Pierre.

In the 1960s, the enclosure became the subject of academic research. (Note: Bertrand 2022e, p. 183) In 1966, a protected area was established in the city according to the Malraux Law. Jacques Biarne, a professor of Roman history at the University of Maine, (Note: Bertrand 2022e, p. 186) and Joseph Guilleux undertook studies of the edifice. The former published a work in 1975, and the latter devoted twenty years to a thesis, which was defended in 1998 and is regarded as one of the most authoritative monographs on this type of building. Joseph Guilleux conducted his research in parallel with the developments in the city, which was undergoing a period of urban renovation.

The edifice was found to be in a state of structural weakness during the 1970s, with a collapse occurring in 1972 in the Saint-Benoît district (Note: Bertrand 2022c, p. 179) and another in 1976 on Rue des fossés Saint-Pierre, close to the Saint-Pierre-la-Cour collegiate church.

A road project along the Sarthe was initiated in the late 1970s but was ultimately terminated due to objections from experts, including Joseph Guilleux, who highlighted the potential damage to the structure and criticized the "negligence of politicians." (Note: Bertrand & Salin 2022, pp. 190–191) Following this, the restoration project was finally initiated.

===== Expansion of research and proactive policy =====
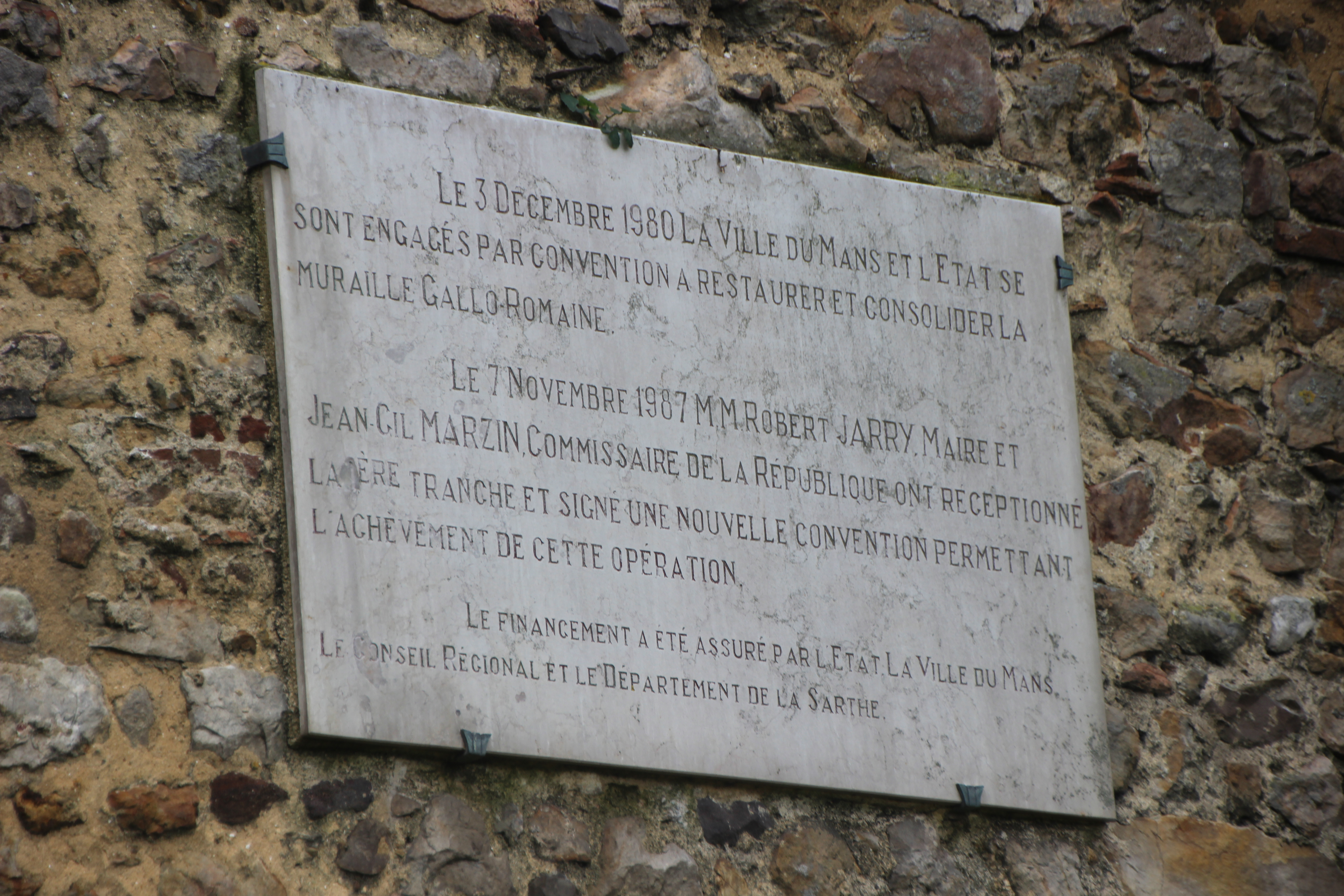
Plaque commemorating the signing of the agreement, lower part of the curtain wall of the Tucé tower.

At a conference held in 1980, an evaluation was conducted, and a cautionary statement was published in the August issue of Archéologia, wherein the enclosure was designated a "national heritage treasure in danger." Subsequently, a memorandum of understanding was concluded in 1980 or 1981 between the municipal authority and the state government to facilitate expanded research on the edifice, its restoration, and its enhancement.

A study based on archaeomagnetism was conducted in the mid-1980s and yielded a date of 280 AD (between 265 and 295) for the construction of the building. Subsequently, Jacques Biarne put forth a date range of 275–295 CE. (Note: Guilleux 2000, p. 251) Joseph Guilleux initially proposed a date of 280 AD, but subsequently, with the advent of improved dating techniques, he advanced a range of 309–546 AD. The construction materials were the subject of study in the 1980s and 1990s. In 2019, an excavation conducted in the garden of the Pierre-de-Ronsard revealed the presence of an archaeological layer that could not be attributed to the construction of the enclosure. Among the artifacts recovered from this layer was a coin minted under the rule of Crispus between 318 and 319 CE. A coin of Constantius II, dated to 337–338 AD, was discovered near the cathedral. Recent studies, which employed enhanced dating techniques and larger sample sizes, have dated the section between the collegiate church and the cathedral to 320–360 AD. The construction sites spanned "several decades."

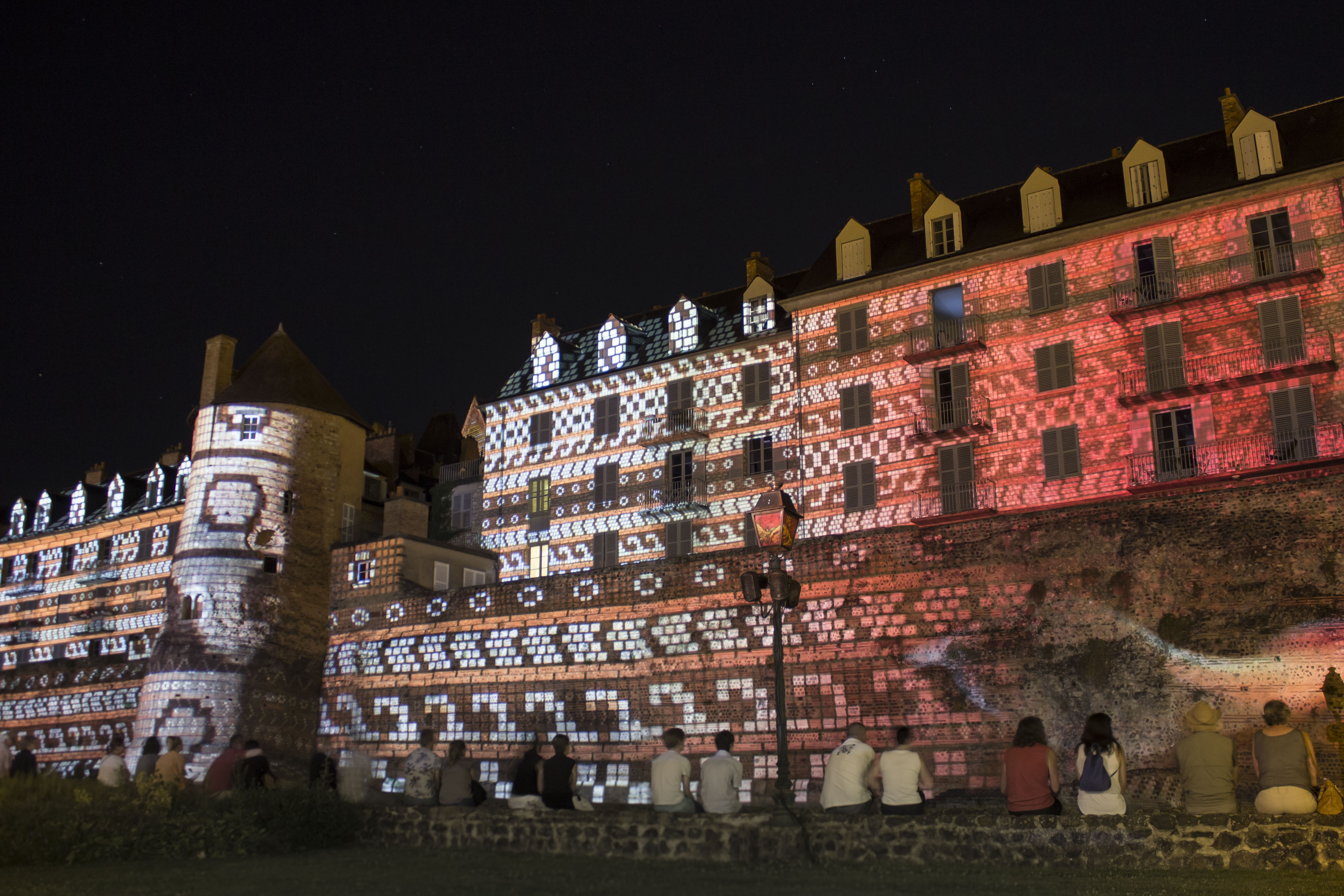
The enclosure illuminated during Chimera Night, 2015.

Since the 1980s, archaeological studies conducted with the assistance of volunteers have facilitated the comprehensive restoration and enhancement of the enclosure, particularly its western section. This area has also served as a venue for festivals and illuminations, with an exhibition held in 1989–1990 and the western façade undergoing a complete restoration in the mid-1990s.

Joseph Guilleux successfully defended his thesis at the University of Maine in 1998 under the guidance of Jacques Biarne. He subsequently published a condensed version of his thesis in 2000. (Note: Bertrand 2022e, pp. 186–187) In 2001, he contributed to the volume of the Carte Archéologique de la Gaule dedicated to the Sarthe department. He subsequently assumed the role of president of the Le Mans Tourist Office. (Note: Bertrand 2022e, p. 187)

In the late 20th and early 21st centuries, the AFAN and, subsequently, the INRAP conducted preventive archaeology. In 2017, (Note: Chevet, Meunier & Monteil 2022, pp. 169–170) an ambitious collective research project commenced, (Note: Chevet, Meunier & Monteil 2022, p. 198) encompassing both preventive and planned excavations. The studies engaged approximately thirty specialists, and research on the history of the enclosure after the Roman Empire is relatively recent.

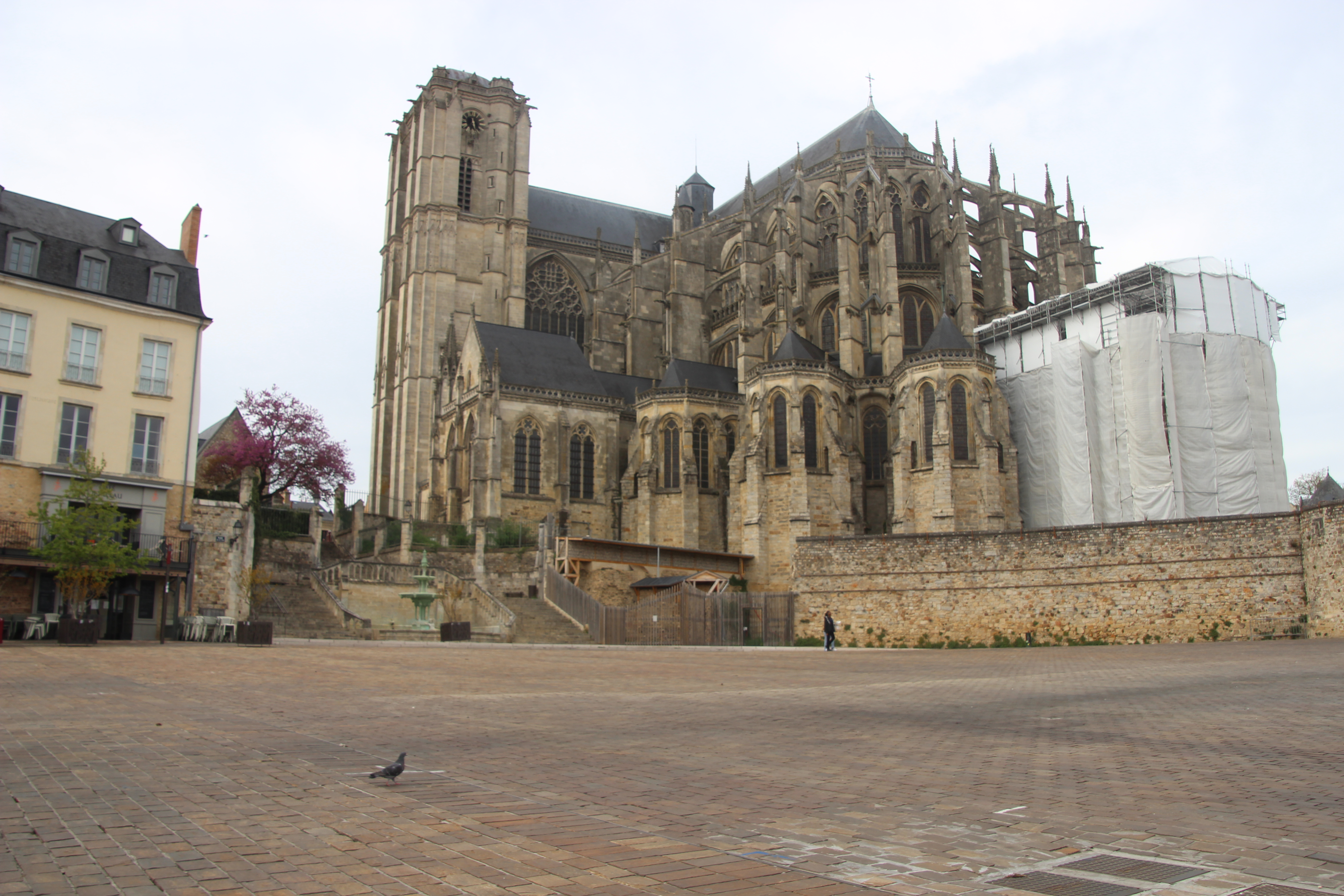
General view of the Place du Jet d'Eau, with the cathedral under construction, the medieval walls and Roman remains.

In the 2010s, research concentrated on the eastern façade of the enclosure, which had been comparatively neglected in comparison to the façade along the Sarthe. The area between the Wilbur-Wright tunnel and the Jet d'eau has been enhanced, and an archaeological garden project at the foot of the cathedral is underway in 2022. The Saint-Michel tower and sections of the enclosure have been rediscovered. In 2018, three towers and a section of the enclosure near the cathedral were uncovered during excavations in preparation for the development of a garden.

=== Enhancement ===
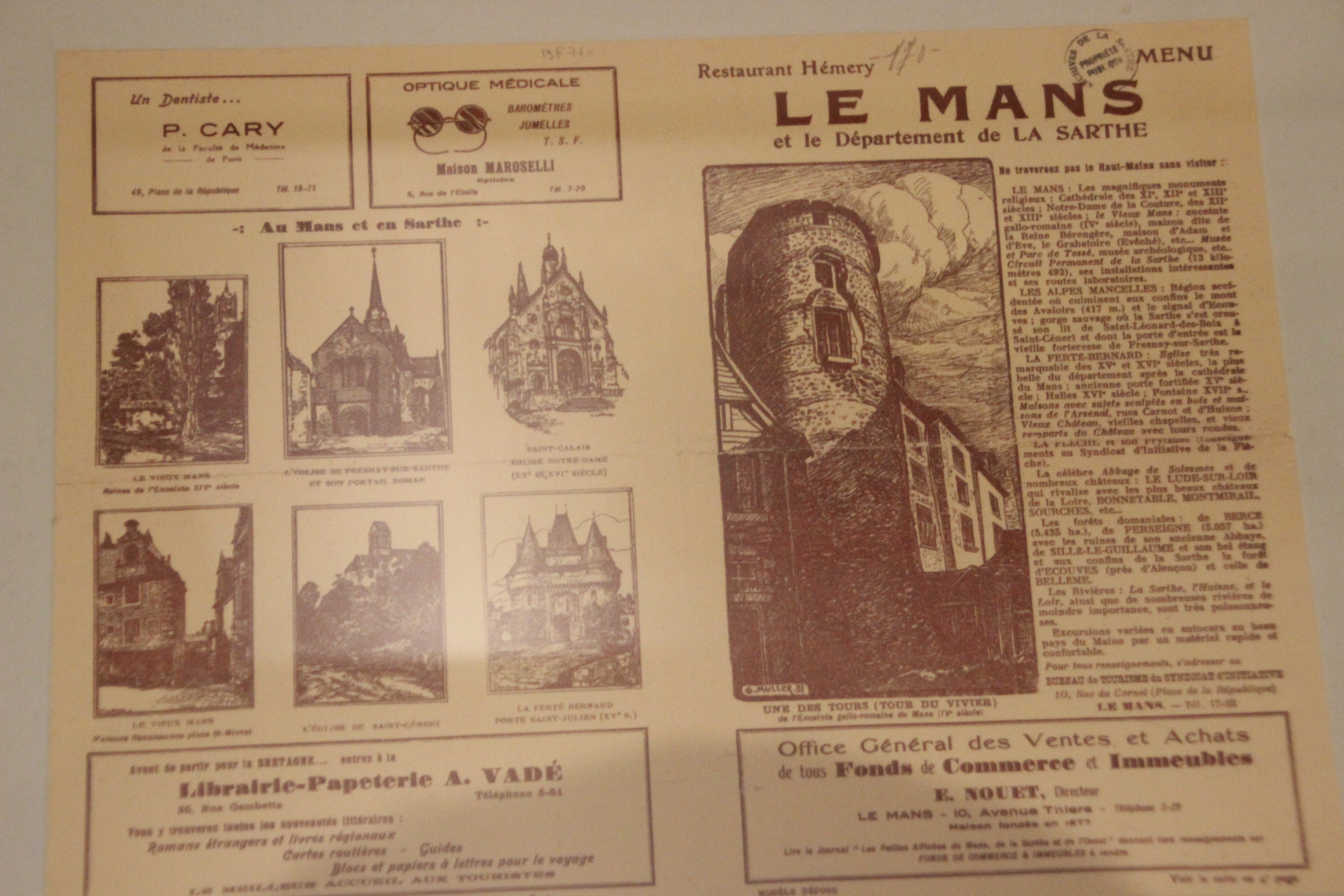
Menu of a restaurant from the first half of the 19th century, with the Vivier tower and other tourist features of the town.

The potential for tourism at the enclosure has been acknowledged since the early 20th century. As early as the late 19th century, scholars successfully advocated for the site's tourism potential to the relevant authorities. Since the late 20th century, the enclosure has been meticulously maintained, particularly through the implementation of regular weeding and cleaning activities.

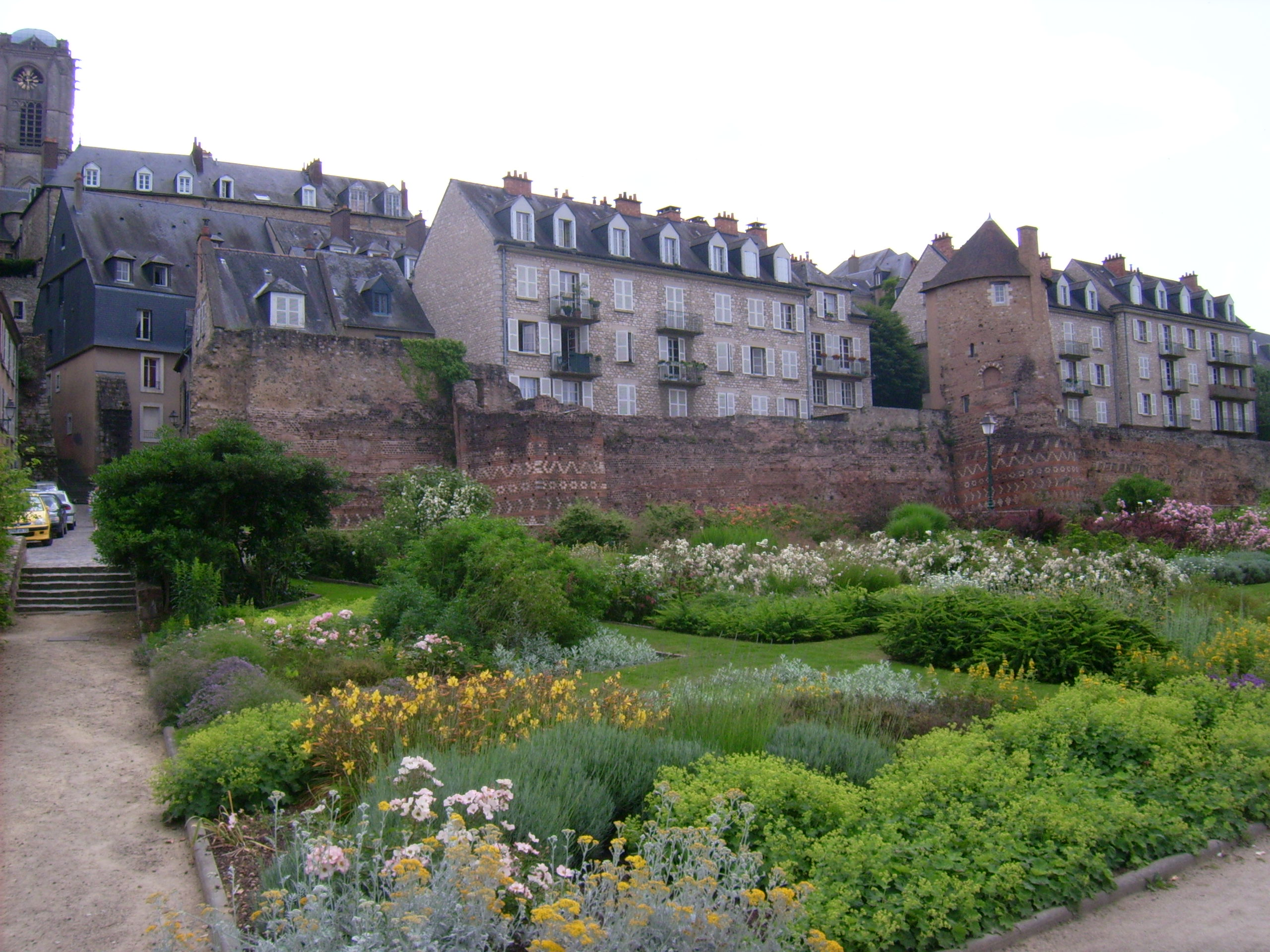
Landscaping at the foot of the Roman wall in 2007.

The initial phase of the project has been completed, with 50% of the enclosure cleared. (Note: Miot & Bertrand 2022, p. 192) This has enabled the creation of a promenade, which has replaced the former parking lots and incorporated appropriate vegetation in gardens inspired by the local artisanal heritage. This has resulted in the formation of the Gourdaine Gardens. The promenade provides visitors with an opportunity to appreciate the enclosure, and the local population has responded positively to this long-hidden monument. (Note: Bertrand & Salin 2022, p. 191)

The edifice was illuminated in the year 2000, and two years later, the municipality was designated as the "Town of Art and History." In addition to the "Night of Chimeras" event, which takes place annually from early July to early September, the heritage enhancement is accompanied by a series of festivals. In 2009, the opening of the Carré Plantagenêt museum marked a significant expansion of the museum enclosure, allowing visitors to gain a new perspective on the area between the Saint-Pierre-de-la-Cour collegiate church and the Ponts-Neufs staircase. This previously inaccessible zone, protected by the Roman enclosure, has now been designated as the "Cité Plantagenêt."

The enclosure was initially considered for UNESCO World Heritage status between 2012 and 2014. However, this initial project was ultimately discontinued. The project was revisited in 2015 and 2016. Experts are currently engaged in the process of drafting the application, to highlight the site's "outstanding universal value." In contrast, the international institution's policy tends to prioritize a balance among the registered sites, with France already representing a significant presence. Other enclosures protected by the international organization include those of Lugo and Rome. A joint research project by the universities of Le Mans and Nantes commenced in 2017, resulting in a more profound understanding of the enclosure. Concurrently, mediation efforts are being undertaken with various stakeholders, while the city's services are addressing the project's implications for on-site management. As of 2022, the application process remained open. (Note: Miot & Bertrand 2022, p. 193)

== See also ==
- Vestiges of the Gallo-Roman wall, Grenoble
- Gallo-Roman wall of Nantes
- Gallo-Roman enclosure of Tours

== Bibliography ==
=== Publications ===
==== General works ====
- Bouillet, Julie; Augry, Stéphane; Bertrand, Estelle; Meunier, Hugo (2022). Au pied du mur. L'enceinte romaine du Mans (in French). Gand: Snoek. ISBN 978-94-616-172-93.
- Guilleux, Joseph (2000). L'Enceinte romaine du Mans (in French). Saint Jean d'Angély: Jean-Michel Bordessoules. ISBN 2-913471-15-3.
- Chevet, Pierre; Meunier, Hugo; Monteil, Martial (2022). "Le Mans/Vindinum, chef-lieu de la cité des Aulerques Cénomans". Revue archéologique de l'ouest (in French) (11): 167–199. ISSN 1775-3732.
- Dornic, François; Auffret, Marc; Biarne, Jacques; Bois, Paul; Garnier, François; Gouhier, Jean; Ménard, Michèle; Philippe, Robert (1988). Histoire du Mans et du pays manceau (in French) (2nd ed.). Toulouse: Privat. ISBN 2-7089-4758-3.

==== History ====
- Bertrand, Estelle (2022a). "La ville du Mans, chef-lieu de la cité des Aulerques Cénomans". Au pied du mur. p. 18.
- Bertrand, Estelle (2022b). "L'enceinte malmenée : les dommages (XIXe – XXe siècle)". Au pied du mur. p. 174.
- Bertrand, Estelle (2022c). "L'enceinte à l'épreuve du temps : les dommages (XIXe – XXe siècle)". Au pied du mur. pp. 175–179.
- Chevet, Pierre (2022). "Le Mans/Vindinum au IIIe siècle : un long déclin avant la construction de l'enceinte". Au pied du mur. pp. 23–25.
- Monteil, Martial (2022a). "Contexte historique". Archéologia (in French) (34): 10–13.
- Monteil, Martial (2022b). "La construction des enceintes romaines tardives en Gaule et dans l'Empire". Au pied du mur. pp. 28–33.
- Augry, Stéphane; Meunier, Hugo (2022a). "L'enceinte antique du Moyen ge au XVIIIe siècle". Archéologia (in French) (34): 46–55.
- Meunier, Hugo (2022a). "L'enceinte et ses abords aux XVIIe et XVIIIe siècles". Au pied du mur. pp. 158–161.
- Bertrand, Estelle; Hirardot, Carole (2022a). "L'enceinte dans la ville au XIXe siècle". Au pied du mur. p. 166.
- Bertrand, Estelle; Hirardot, Carole (2022b). "L'enceinte du Mans vue par les savants et les artistes". Au pied du mur. pp. 167–173.
- Fillion-Braguet, Bénédicte (2022). "Le lapidaire du haut Moyen ge de la tour Saint-Michel". Au pied du mur. pp. 136–137.
- Meunier, Hugo (2022b). "Le devenir de l'enceinte urbaine entre Moyen ge et temps modernes". Au pied du mur. pp. 120–121.
- Meunier, Hugo; Monteil, Martial (2022). "Le Mans : que sait-on de la ville de l'Antiquité tardive ?". Au pied du mur. pp. 90–94.
- Meunier, Hugo (2022c). "L'enceinte et la ville au haut Moyen ge". Au pied du mur. pp. 128–133.
- Augry, Stéphane; Meunier, Hugo (2022b). "L'enceinte dans le tissu urbain médiéval (Xe – XVIe siècle)". Au pied du mur. pp. 139–148.

==== Historiography and heritage enhancement ====
- Meunier, Hugo; Monteil, Martial (2022a). "Les évocations de l'enceinte par les érudits entre les XVIe et XVIIIe siècles". Au pied du mur. pp. 162–163.
- Augry, Stéphane; Meunier, Hugo; Monteil, Martial (2022a). "40 ans de recherches archéologiques (1980–2022)". Archéologia (in French) (34): 14–21.
- Bertrand, Estelle (2022d). "40 ans de restauration et de mise en valeur". Archéologia (in French) (34): 56–61.
- Bertrand, Estelle; Miot, Franck (2022). "Demande d'inscription à l'Unesco". Archéologia (in French) (34): 63.
- Meunier, Hugo; Monteil, Martial (2022b). "Le renouveau des connaissances sur l'enceinte romaine du Mans". Au pied du mur. pp. 34–37.
- Bertrand, Estelle (2022e). "Érudits et archéologues, entre recherches et sauvegarde". Au pied du mur. pp. 180–183.
- Bertrand, Estelle (2022f). "Les recherches de Joseph Guilleux". Au pied du mur. pp. 186–187.
- Bertrand, Estelle; Salin, Élodie (2022). "L'enceinte restaurée, patrimoine de la Ville du Mans". Au pied du mur. pp. 188–191.
- Miot, Franck; Bertrand, Estelle (2022). "La demande d'inscription Unesco". Au pied du mur. pp. 192–193.

==== Construction ====
- Meunier, Hugo; Monteil, Martial; Augry, Stéphane (2022). "L'enceinte romaine du Mans : une construction monumentale". Archéologia (in French) (34): 22–35.
- Augry, Stéphane (2015). "Éléments inédits de l'enceinte romaine". Archéopages (in French). 41: 94–95. doi:10.4000/archeopages.1071. ISSN 1622-8545. Archived from the original on 1 March 2023.
- Guilleux, Joseph (2004). "L'enceinte romaine de la ville du Mans et les thermes de l'ancienne école Claude Chappe". Revue archéologique (in French) (37): 214–217. ISSN 0035-0737. JSTOR 41017199. Archived from the original on 1 March 2023.
- Meunier, Hugo; Monteil, Martial (2019). "Le Mans. L'enceinte romaine et la nef de la collégiale comtale Saint-Pierre-de-la-Cour". Bulletin Monumental (in French). 177 (177–1): 59–63. doi:10.3406/bulmo.2019.13525. ISSN 0007-473X.
- Nauleau, Jean-François (2022). "La brique". Au pied du mur. pp. 71–72.
- Coutelas, Arnaud (2022). "Les mortiers de chaux". Au pied du mur. pp. 73–74.
- Coutelas, Arnaud; Augry, Stéphane (2022). "La production de chaux". Au pied du mur. p. 75.
- Augry, Stéphane (2022a). "Le bois". Au pied du mur. pp. 76–77.
- Deloze, Valérie; Polinski, Alexandre (2022). "La pierre : le regard des géologues". Au pied du mur. pp. 78–79.
- Meunier, Hugo; Monteil, Martial (2022c). "L'enceinte du Mans : situation topographique et tracé". Au pied du mur. pp. 38–39.
- Augry, Stéphane; Meunier, Hugo; Monteil, Martial (2022b). "Les fonctions de l'enceinte". Au pied du mur. pp. 40–43.
- Meunier, Hugo; Monteil, Martial (2022d). "Dater l'enceinte : nouvelles données et évolution des propositions". Au pied du mur. pp. 47–48.
- Meunier, Hugo; Monteil, Martial (2022e). "Le chantier". Au pied du mur. pp. 58–64.
- Meunier, Hugo; Monteil, Martial (2022f). "Les matériaux de construction". Au pied du mur. p. 70.
- Meunier, Hugo; Monteil, Martial (2022g). "Les caractéristiques architecturales de l'enceinte". Au pied du mur. pp. 80–87.
- Meunier, Hugo; Monteil, Martial (2022h). "Le Mans : que sait-on de la ville de l'Antiquité tardive ?". Au pied du mur. pp. 90–94.
- Augry, Stéphane (2022). "La fouille archéologique des jardins de la cathédrale". Au pied du mur. pp. 150–154.

=== Operations summaries ===
- Guilleux, Joseph (2020). "Le Mans – Rue des Fossés Saint-Pierre. Sondage (1993)". Archéologie de la France – Informations (in French). ISSN 2114-0502. Archived from the original on 1 March 2023.
- Guilleux, Joseph (2020). "Le Mans – Place du Général-Grente. Sauvetage urgent (1992)". Archéologie de la France – Informations (in French). ISSN 2114-0502. Archived from the original on 1 March 2023.
- Meunier, Hugo; Monteil, Martial (2023). "L'enceinte romaine du Mans : bilan des connaissances. Projet collectif de recherche (2020)". Archéologie de la France – Informations (in French). ISSN 2114-0502. Archived from the original on 1 March 2023.
- Prouteau, Nicolas (2020). "Le Mans – Tour du Tunnel. Sondage (2009)". Archéologie de la France – Informations (in French). ISSN 2114-0502. Archived from the original on 27 August 2024.
- Scheffer, Marie-Ève (2022). "Le Mans – Hôtel de Ville. Évaluation (1999)". Archéologie de la France – Informations (in French). ISSN 2114-0502. Archived from the original on 10 November 2023.
