= Ancient bridges over the Loire in the Touraine area =

Bridges over the Loire

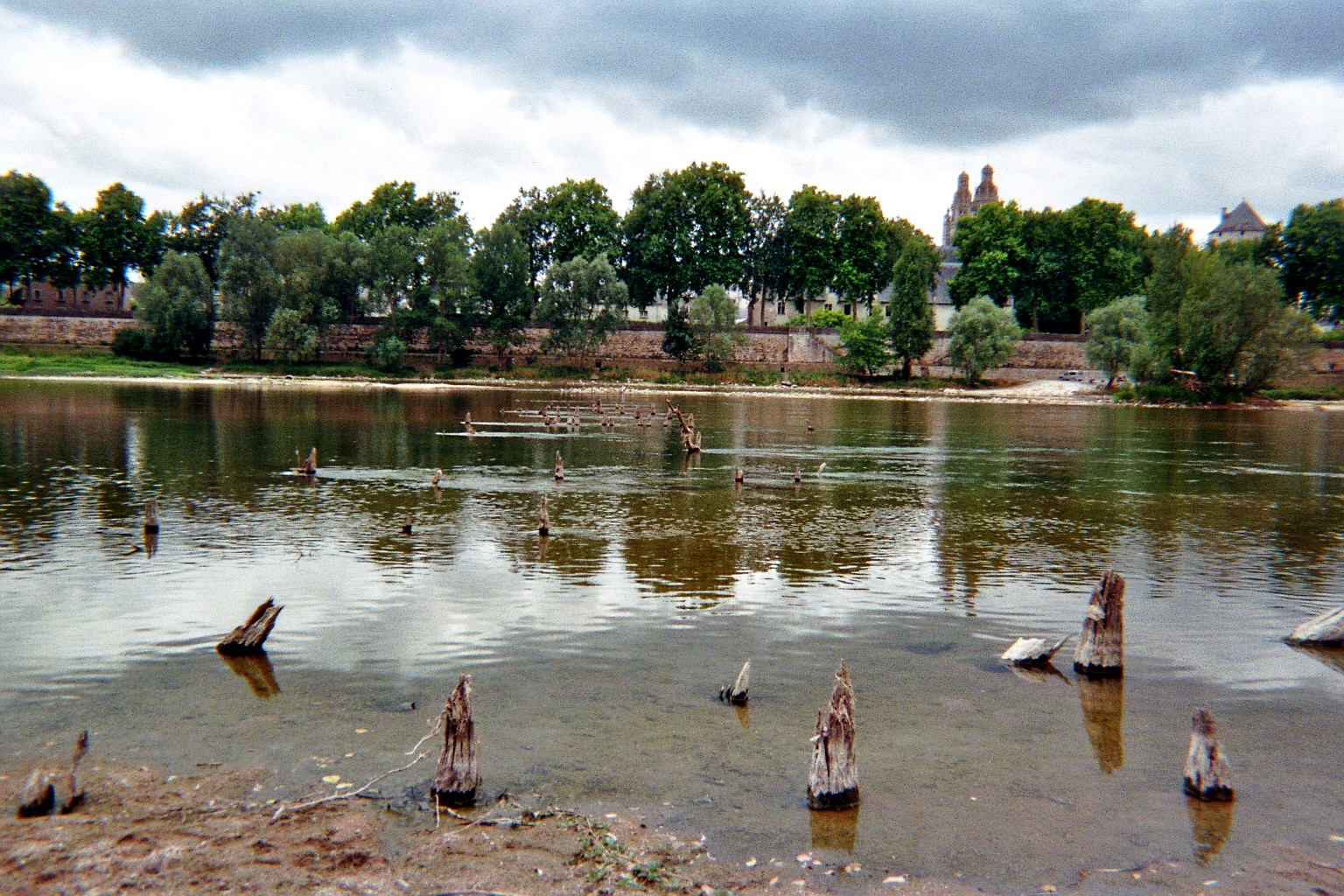
- Remains of the “Aucard Island” bridge (4th century)
- Location: Touraine, Indre-et-Loire, France
- Coordinates: 47°23′37″N 0°41′21″E
- Type: Bridge
- Beginning date: 1st century
- Completion date: 3rd century
- Dedicated to: Tours and Fondettes

The ancient bridges over the Loire in the Touraine area were wooden structures erected during the Roman Empire to facilitate river navigation close to Fondettes and Tours, then known as Caesarodunum. Two bridges, constructed in the 1st century, appear to have been operational concurrently. The third bridge, erected in the early 4th century when walls enclosed the city, superseded the preceding two bridges, which were subsequently dismantled.

The remnants of these bridges, unearthed around the turn of the 21st century, are discernible as lines of stakes embedded in the riverbed. They become visible during periods of low water levels, which are now occurring with greater frequency and duration.

== Geographical and historical context ==
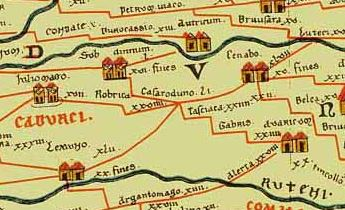
Extract from the Peutinger Table, mentioning Casaroduno (Tours).

The city of Caesarodunum, an open city established at the beginning of the era and intended to serve as the capital of the Turoni territory, was founded between the Loire and Cher rivers, in an area where several significant ancient routes intersected.

Among these was a south-north road connecting Limonum (Poitiers) to Vindunum (Le Mans). This route is mentioned on the Tabula Peutingeriana and is believed to have followed a Gallic path, necessitating a crossing of the Loire. While the route of this road to the south and north of Tours is well-documented, its course through the alluvial plain is less well-known. However, it seems to have passed a few kilometers west of Tours. Until the early 21st century, the method used to cross the Loire—whether by bridge or ford—was unknown, as was the accurate point of crossing.

Caesarodunum, established to the east of the Poitiers-Le Mans road, was linked to it by a branch road constructed to the south of Tours. However, the city, situated within the alluvial plain between the two rivers, also required specific crossing structures over the Cher and Loire rivers. (Note: Galinié 2007, p. 232, Jacques Seigne & Patrick Neury, Les ponts antiques sur la Loire) Until the late 20th century, the precise nature of these crossings during antiquity remained uncertain, as acknowledged by Henri Galinié in 1985: "A bridge over the Loire, a river port, quays, and a landing stage are necessities that remain unlocalized."

A similar question emerged in the early 4th century when the city appeared to have diminished in size and been confined to a fortified enclosure. The question of whether a bridge or ford crossed the Loire at that time—whether a new structure or a continued use of an older one—remained unresolved for some time.

== Ancient bridges ==
In the late 20th century, and especially from the beginning of the 21st century, alterations in the Loire's hydrological regime (baseflow, more pronounced low-water periods) permitted the undertaking of new observations within the riverbed. (Note: Galinié 2007, p. 237, Jacques Seigne & Patrick Neury, Les ponts antiques sur la Loire) These findings led to the discovery of three ancient bridges that had crossed the Loire in the suburbs downstream from Tours (the "Fondettes" bridge) or within the city itself (the "Île Saint-Jacques" bridge and the "Île Aucard" bridge).

=== "Fondettes" Bridge ===
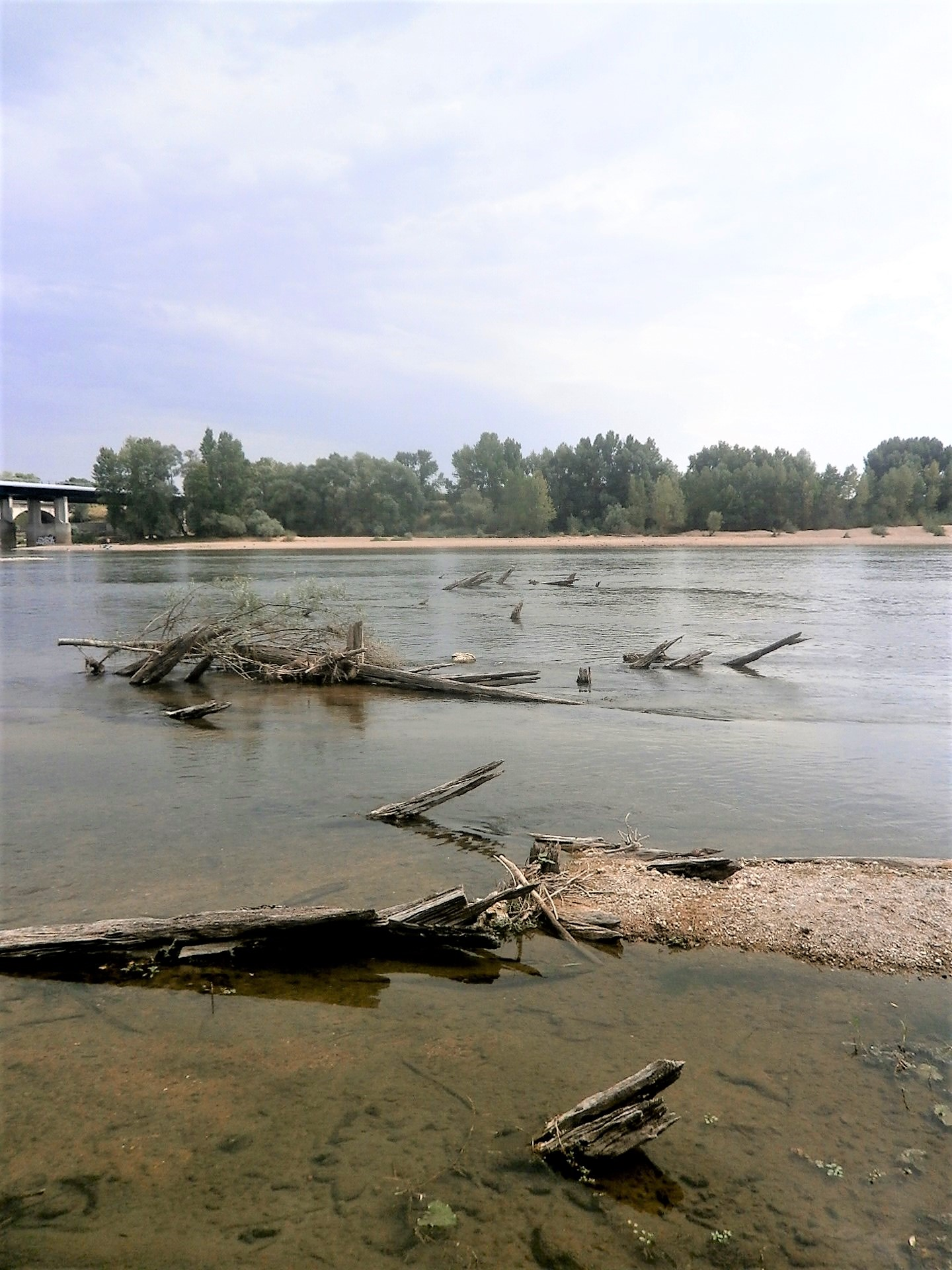
Remains of the ancient bridge at Fondettes.

In the 1970s, clusters of stakes in the Loire riverbed downstream from Tours were observed. To confirm the hypothesis of an ancient bridge crossing at this location and to date its construction, samples of stakes were subjected to analysis using carbon-14 dating and dendrochronology. (Note: Couderc 1998, pp. 395–396)

It seems probable that this bridge allowed the Poitiers-Le Mans road to cross the Loire. The presence of a valley provided convenient access to the northern hillside, which was protected by a nearby oppidum. This structure possibly replaced an older one at the same location. (Note: Couderc 1998, p. 403) The bridge was constructed entirely of wood and was erected in the early years of the common era. (Note: Galinié 2007, p. 233, Jacques Seigne & Patrick Neury, Les ponts antiques sur la Loire) It was equipped with a wooden caisson at its northern end, which facilitated the transition between the bridge deck and the roadway. The differing structures of some piers suggest that one or more repair campaigns were undertaken, (Note: Couderc 1998, p. 401) a hypothesis supported by the dating results for the stakes, which indicate a date of around 125 AD. Pieces of the bridge deck found near the northern bank suggest that the bridge was deliberately dismantled. (Note: Galinié 2007, p. 238, Jacques Seigne & Patrick Neury, Les ponts antiques sur la Loire)

In 1987, constructing a channel for a windsurfing competition destroyed the majority of these remains, leaving only a few stakes situated near the northern bank. (Note: Couderc 1998, p. 393)

=== "Île Saint-Jacques" Bridge ===
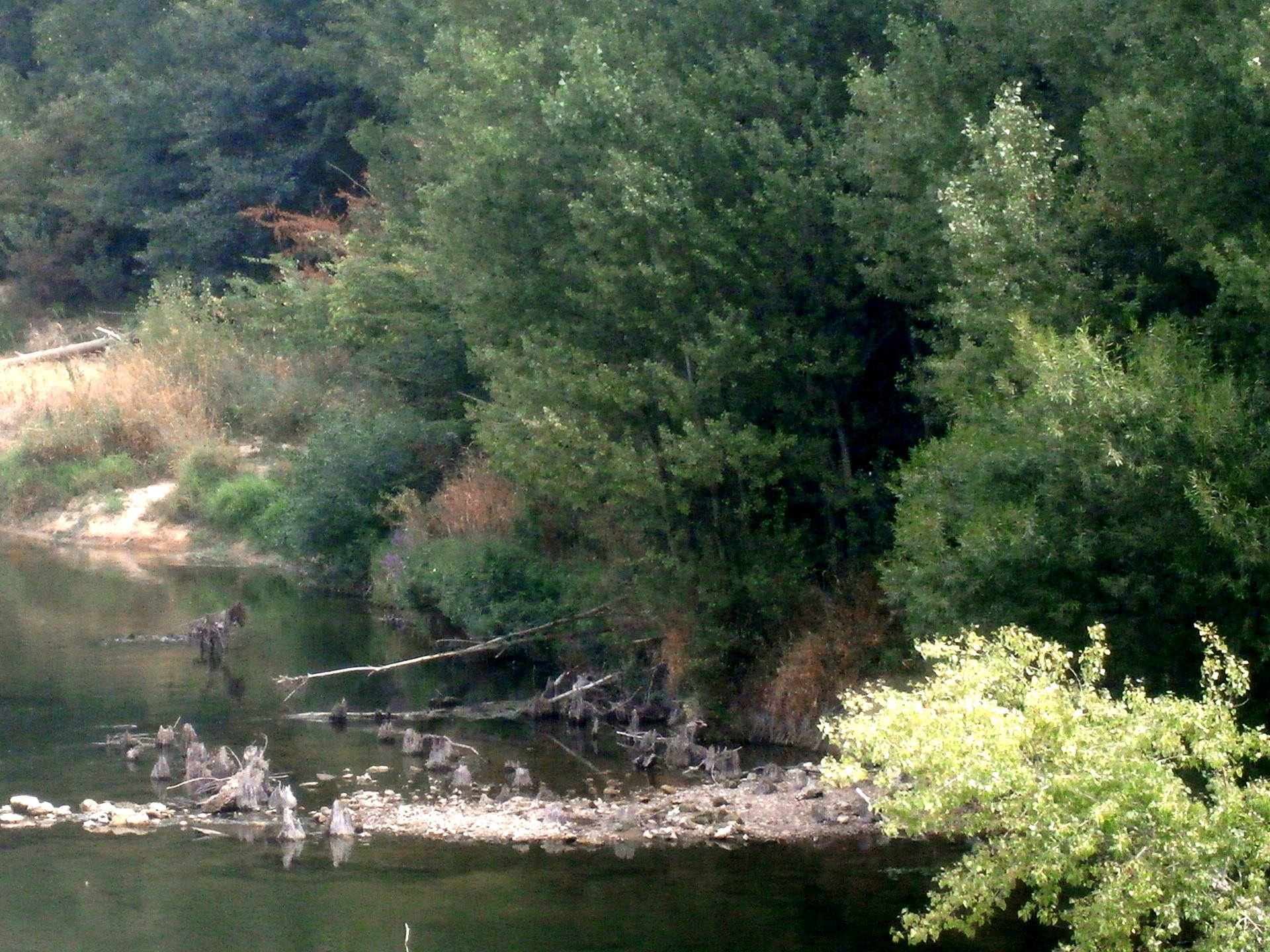
Remains of the Île Saint-Jacques Bridge.

The "Île Saint-Jacques" bridge is situated approximately 100 meters east of the Wilson Bridge. The bridge's name is derived from an island in the Loire that no longer exists. The bridge is visible from a few stakes near the northern bank or within the riverbed. Additionally, a series of stake alignments can be observed near a modern dike. The sparse remains, studied in 2003, permit the reconstruction of a wooden bridge that connected a valley on the northern bank of the river to Caesarodunum. This hypothesis is corroborated by the discovery of a masonry structure south of the modern quay, interpreted as the abutment of this ancient bridge during excavations conducted between 2000 and 2003. (Note: Galinié 2007, pp. 171–180, Henri Galinié et al., La fouille du square Prosper-Mérimée) Furthermore, in addition to the aforementioned remains, a north-south road was unearthed in the vicinity of a substantial temple and a thermal complex, situated to the south of the ancient city. (Note: Galinié 2007, p. 191, Anne-Marie Jouquand, À l'est du temple, rue de Lucé) These structures have been dated to the first half of the 1st century. (Note: Galinié 2007, p. 17, Henri Galinié, Préambule historique et archéologique) The bridge, abutment, and road collectively constitute a north-south axis extending into the city and serving multiple public edifices. This road is postulated to represent the cardo maximus. (Note: Galinié 2007, p. 327, Jacques Seigne, Le plan d'urbanisme de la ville ouverte)

The "Île Saint-Jacques" Bridge, with a length of approximately 560 meters, was constructed between 40 and 60 AD and subsequently underwent regular repairs until the mid-2nd century. (Note: Galinié 2007, p. 235, Jacques Seigne & Patrick Neury, Les ponts antiques sur la Loire) Its utilization appears to have terminated in the 4th century, at which point the masonry components of its southern abutment were repurposed. (Note: Galinié 2007, p. 176, Henri Galinié et al., La fouille du square Prosper-Mérimée)

=== "Île Aucard" Bridge ===
Remains and materialization of the Aucard Island bridge right-of-way.

In 1978, the lowering of the Loire's water level revealed a series of stakes embedded in the riverbed, extending from the upstream side of Île Aucard, situated in the eastern part of Tours, towards the southern bank. In 1985, the hypothesis of a bridge crossing the Loire in the Late Roman Empire was proposed, but natural changes in the riverbed prevented further observations. The remains reappeared several times from 2000 onwards across most of the riverbed between Île Aucard and the southern bank, except for the crossing of the island and the narrow channel separating it from the northern bank, which escaped investigation.

The alignment of the stakes suggests the presence of a bridge with a length of at least 270 meters, whose rectangular piers supported a wooden deck. The application of carbon-14 dating to some of the stakes indicates a construction date between 205 and 280 AD, which makes the bridge older than the castrum erected in the early 4th century.

The bridge extended to the midpoint of the northern wall of the castrum, aligned with the principal axis of the amphitheater. Possibly, a gate was constructed in the wall at this location. The entire setup served as a mechanism to control access to the Loire River by forcing passage through the fortifications and regulating arrivals from the northern bank. On the north side, the bridge led to a valley perpendicular to the Loire. (Note: Galinié 2007, p. 236, Jacques Seigne & Patrick Neury, Les ponts antiques sur la Loire) The date of its abandonment is unknown; however, neither Paulinus of Périgueux (late 5th century) nor Gregory of Tours (late 6th century) explicitly mentions it in their writings.

== Chronology of ancient crossings of the Loire in Tours ==
The method of crossing the Loire at Caesarodunum underwent significant evolution throughout antiquity. During the High Empire, two bridges, the "Fondettes" and the "Île Saint-Jacques", which appear to be roughly contemporary, operated simultaneously. The first bridge was situated along the main axis of the Poitiers-Le Mans road, while the second bridge was located in the city itself. These bridges were maintained until the late 3rd century.

At the turn of the 3rd and 4th centuries, a shift occurred in the situation. The Tours castrum was constructed along with a bridge to the east of the previous ones, which opened within the fortified enclosure. The other two bridges were subsequently abandoned and likely dismantled. Subsequently, the only Loire crossing at Tours—and no other bridges have been found for several dozen kilometers upstream or downstream—was via the "Île Aucard" bridge, which required passage through the castrum, effectively acting as a checkpoint for north-south traffic.

== Bibliography ==
- Chevalier, Bernard (1985). Histoire de Tours [History of Tours]. Univers de la France et des pays francophones (in French). Toulouse: Privat. ISBN 2-7089-8224-9.
- Courtois, Julien (2004). Gués et ponts antiques dans le territoire de la cité des Turons : mémoire de maîtrise en archéologie [Fords and ancient bridges in the territory of the city of Turons: Master's thesis in archaeology] (in French). Tours: Université François-Rabelais.
- Couderc, Jean-Mary (1998). "Le pont antique de Fondettes sur la Loire" [The ancient Fondettes bridge over the Loire]. Bulletin de la Société archéologique de Touraine (in French). XLV: 393–406.
- Croubois, Claude (1986). L'indre-et-Loire – La Touraine, des origines à nos jours [Indre-et-Loire - Touraine, from its origins to the present day]. L’histoire par les documents (in French). Saint-Jean-d’Angely: Bordessoules. ISBN 2-903504-09-1.
- Galinié, Henri (2007). Tours antique et médiéval. Lieux de vie, temps de la ville. 40 ans d'archéologie urbaine, Supplément à la RACF n° 30, numéro spécial de la collection Recherches sur Tours [Ancient and medieval Tours. Lieux de vie, temps de la ville. 40 ans d'archéologie urbaine, Supplement to RACF no. 30, special issue of the Recherches sur Tours collection.] (in French). Tours: FERACF. ISBN 978-2-913272-15-6.
- Riou, Samuel; Dufaÿ, Bruno (2016). Le site de la chapelle Saint-Libert dans la cité de Tours, Mémoire LXXIII de la Société archéologique de Touraine - 61e supplément à la Revue archéologique du centre de la France [The site of the Saint-Libert chapel in the city of Tours, Memory LXXIII of the Archaeological Society of Touraine - 61st supplement to the Archaeological Review of Central France] (in French). Tours: FERACF. ISBN 978-2-913272-47-7.
