= Gallo-Roman Temple of Tours =

Romano-Celtic temple in Tours, France

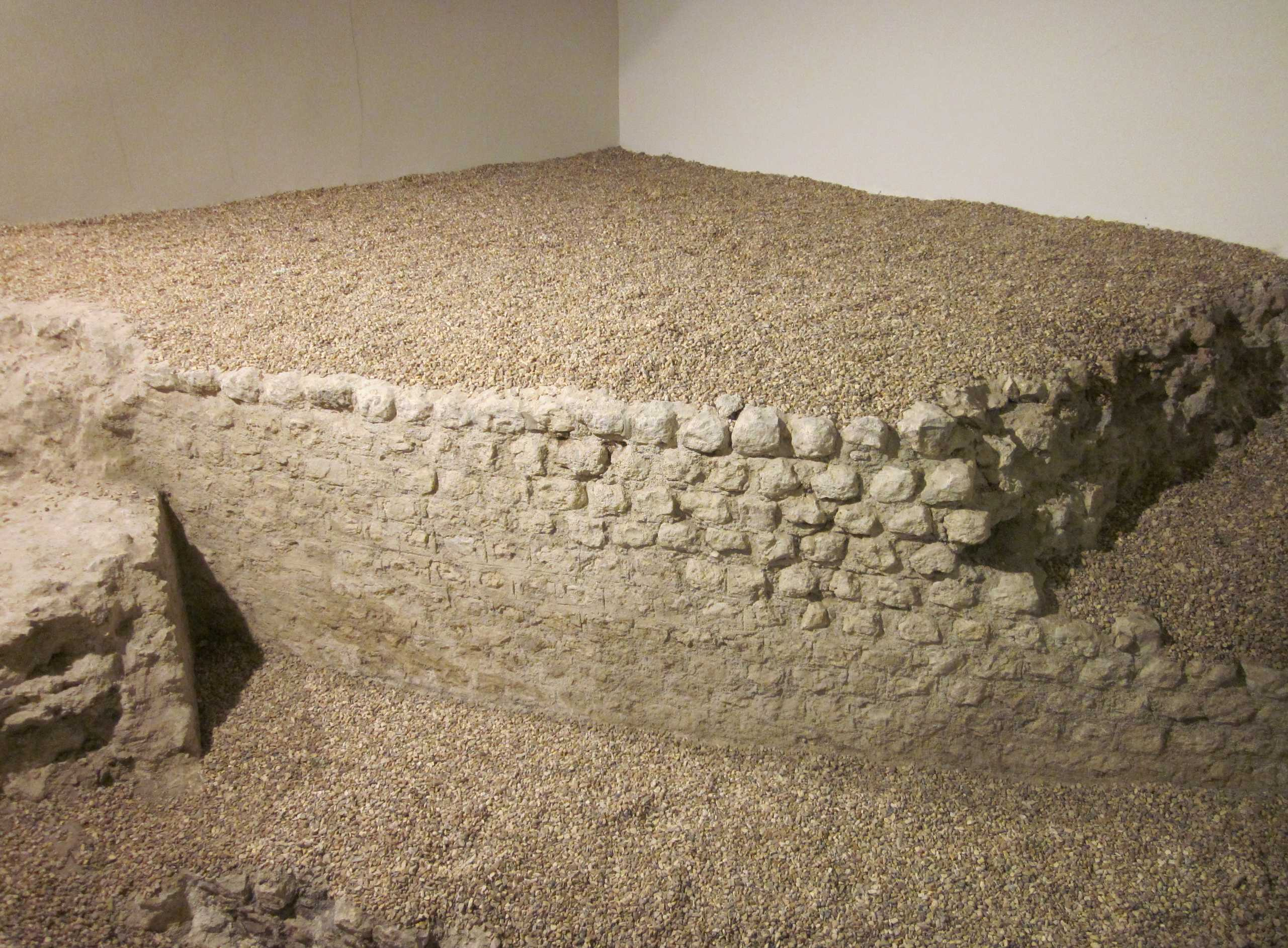
- Remains of the cella (sanctuary) and pronaos of the temple.

- Location within France
- 47°23′46″N 0°41′17″E
- Type: Romano-Celtic temple
- Periods: Classical Antiquity
- Cultures: Turoni, Gallo-Roman
- Location: Tours (France)
- Region: Centre-Val de Loire

History
- Built: 1st century

Site notes
- Material: Limestone
- Length: 37 m (121 ft)
- Width: 29.5 m (97 ft)
- Excavation dates: 1951, 1994, 2001-2002
- Condition: Ruined

Monument historique
- Designated: 1953

The Gallo-Roman temple of Tours is an ancient religious building of the fanum type, dated to the late 1st century CE. It was located in the city center of the ancient settlement of Caesarodunum, which also corresponds to the heart of the contemporary city of Tours, in the Indre-et-Loire department.

It most likely succeeded an earlier sanctuary built in the first half of the 1st century at the same location. The temple belongs to the relatively small group of urban Celtic-inspired temples with a circular sanctuary, such as the Tower of Vesunna in Périgueux. Its cella probably measured over thirty meters in external diameter and stood at least twenty meters high. It was preceded to the east by a pronaos in classical Roman style, topped with a triangular pediment, and the entire structure was enclosed within a peribolus of about 0.7 hectares. The temple appears as the result of the merging of two religious and architectural cultures, although the reasons for choosing such a unique design remain unknown. Many elements of its architecture, decor, and surroundings remain undiscovered. Furthermore, historians and archaeologists know nothing about the dates of the temple’s abandonment and destruction, nor the identity of the deity or deities it was dedicated to. Nevertheless, from the Early Middle Ages onward, a necropolis occupied the site of this ancient monument, and a 15th-century urban wall reused some of its structures.

Its existence was revealed through medieval texts, but not its precise location. It was accidentally uncovered during the clearing of ruins in Tours after World War II and was quickly examined. The remains were destroyed in the urgent push for reconstruction. The temple underwent two preventive or rescue excavation campaigns in the 1990s and around the turn of the third millennium; its immediate surroundings were partially studied in 2000 and 2011. Nowadays, only a few rare underground remains of this grand temple are known, all listed in the General Inventory of Cultural Heritage. However, other parts likely remain, sealed within the foundations of buildings reconstructed after the war.

== Temple at the heart of the ancient city ==
=== Caesarodunum during the Early Empire ===
Probably founded during the reign of Augustus or Tiberius, between 10 BCE and 20 or 30 CE, Caesarodunum was established in the valley between the Loire and Cher rivers, at the site now occupied by Tours. The area of the ancient city is estimated to be at least 80 hectares, though urbanization was denser along the Loire. Caesarodunum had monuments and public facilities, including an amphitheater, two bathhouses, two aqueducts, a bridge, and the temple; (Note: Galinié 2007, pp. 330–331) other structures likely remain to be discovered. The city reached its peak during the Early Empire in the 2nd century.

=== Location and orientation ===
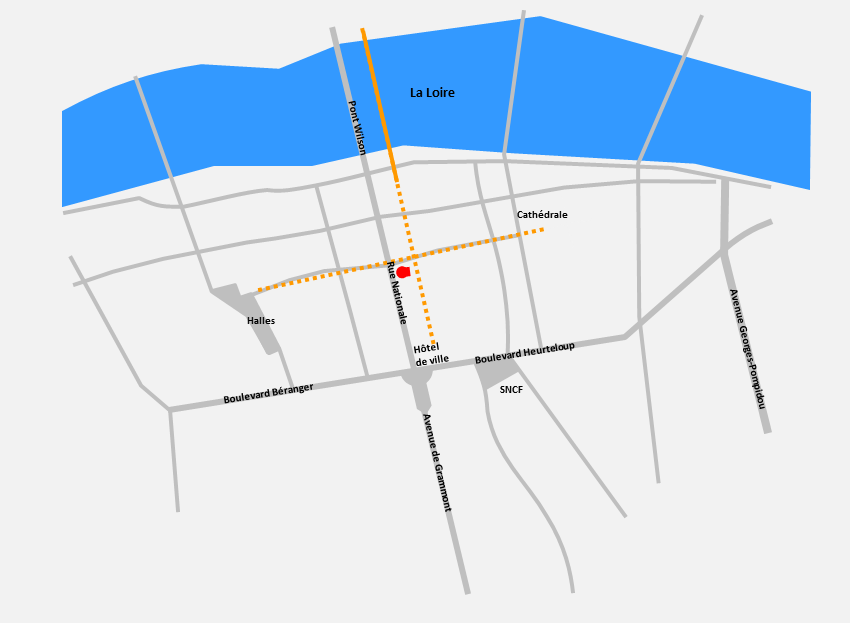
The road network and the temple of Caesarodunum in the present-day city. (Note: Galinié 2007, pp. 326–328) grey lines: modern road network orange: the main ancient roads rouge: the temple

The temple of Tours is located in the hypercenter of the 21st-century city, within the block bordered by Rue Nationale to the west, Rue de Lucé to the east, Rue de la Scellerie to the north, and Rue Émile-Zola to the south. It lies buried beneath the Nouvel Olympia theater and the Regional Dramatic Arts Center.

According to prevailing hypotheses in 2014 regarding the road network of the city during the Early Empire, the decumanus maximus is identified with Rue de la Scellerie and Rue des Halles, while the cardo maximus roughly follows Rue de Lucé, extending from a wooden bridge over the Loire and leading south to public baths. These two main axes of the ancient city would have intersected northeast of the temple. The city’s heart, thus defined, would have centered around some of Caesarodunum’s public facilities, including the forum, an essential feature of Roman cities, even though exceptions to this rule exist. (Note: Bedon, Chevallier & Pinon 1988, p. 206) The forum has not been identified in Tours, but it could suggest its location within one of the three remaining quadrants of this strategic crossroads. Additionally, a source, possibly sacred, was discovered nearby and laboriously filled in 1952; this source could be linked to the forum, or even to the temple itself.

The temple faces almost precisely east and is aligned with other monuments of the ancient city. This orientation is a very typical arrangement for this type of monument, (Note: Bedon, Chevallier & Pinon 1988, p. 124) according to religious conventions. The pronaos facade forms a slight angle with the cardo maximus, slightly oriented southeast and northwest due to topographical constraints (to maintain orthogonality with the decumani and the ancient shoreline of the Loire).

== Architecture and dating ==
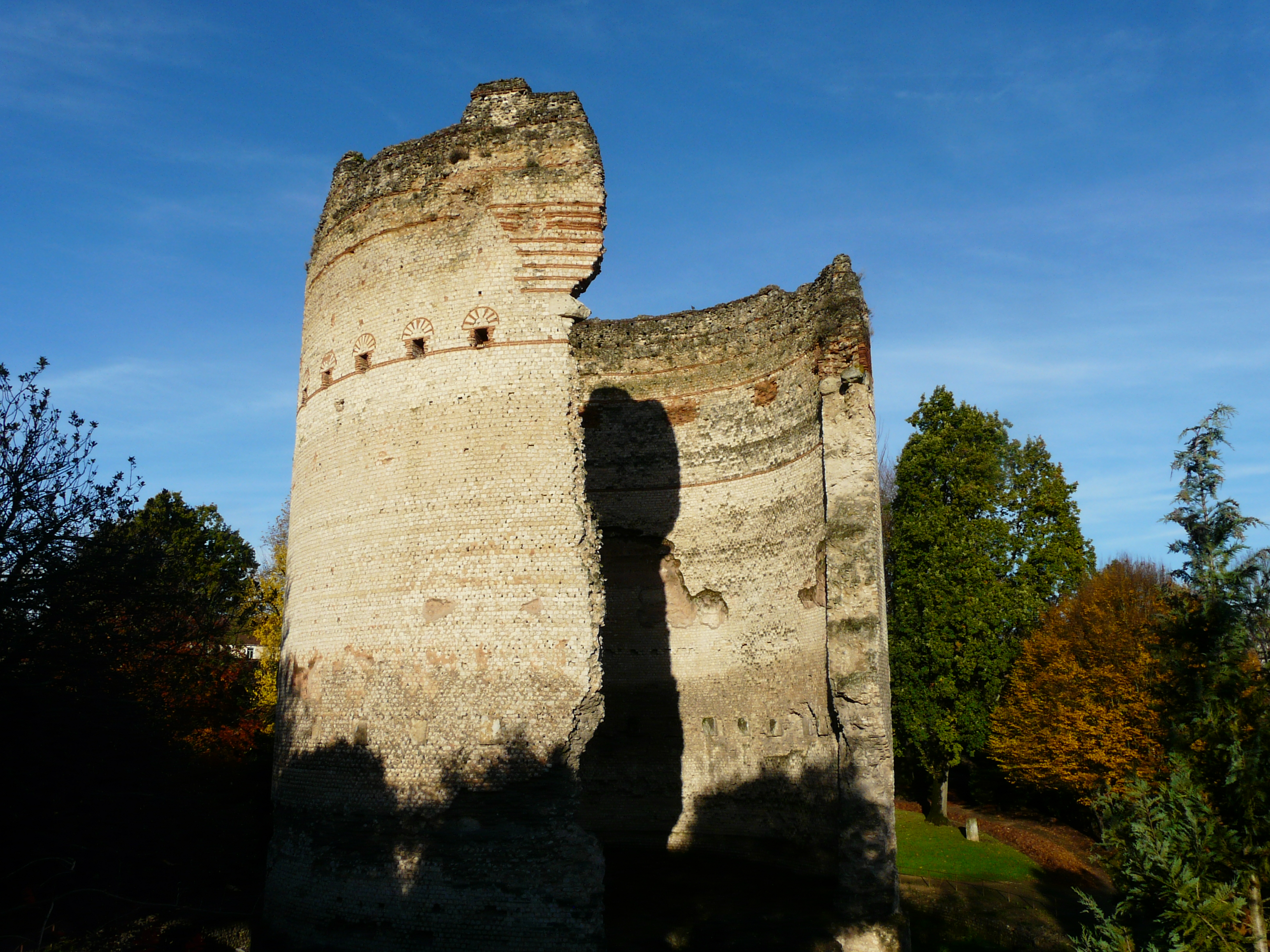
The Tour de Vésone, in Périgueux.

A 3D animation available on the website of the National Institute for Preventive Archaeological Research (INRAP) offers a reconstruction of the temple, depicting a fanum-type structure that blends Celtic influences (circular cella) and classical Roman architecture (a pronaos with columns topped by a triangular pediment). This design represents a fusion of two religious cultures and architectural styles. Pierre Audin describes it as "a fortunate alliance between Romanization and loyalty to indigenous traditions." In this regard, the temple of Tours belongs to the group of large circular cella temples, including those of Barzan, Cahors, Périgueux, and Vendeuvre-du-Poitou. (Note: Galinié 2007, pp. 194–195)

The temple of Tours is large. The only confirmed dimension that allows for a comparison is the exterior diameter of the cella: 34.80 meters for the temple of Tours and 19.60 meters for the Tour de Vésone in Périgueux, a structure of comparable, if not similar, design.

=== Earlier structure preceding the temple ===
Beneath the temple’s foundation level, predating it and directly dug into the natural alluvial soil, (Note: The natural ground level in this part of the city is at 47 m NGF, which is 4 m below the ground level in the 21st century (Morin, Eymeric; Rodier, Xavier; Laurent-Dehecq, Amélie; Macaire, Jean-Jacques (2013). "Évolution morphologique et sédimentaire de la plaine alluviale d'un espace urbanisé (Tours, Indre-et-Loire, France)" [Morphological and sedimentary evolution of the alluvial plain of an urbanized area (Tours, Indre-et-Loire, France)]. Revue archéologique du centre de la France (in French). 52.)) a trench from a previous wall was discovered. It was filled with debris, including fragments of red plaster that once covered this wall. The persistence of this plaster on the wall suggests it must have been protected from the elements, possibly by a roof. Marks from stakes and possibly a well, the coping of which had been dismantled, were also identified. The trench was dug into the natural soil, indicating that the wall was, chronologically, the first structure established in this area. A possible dating points to construction during Tiberius’s reign, with the site being occupied until the third quarter of the 1st century CE. The fragmentary nature of these remains makes interpretation difficult. However, a hypothesis suggests an initial Tiberian-Claudian cult complex (built between 14 and 54 CE) that directly preceded the large temple, reflecting continuity in the site's use. This early complex would have consisted, among other things, of a courtyard partially sheltered by a roof and possibly a cultic well. (Note: Galinié 2007, pp. 190–191)

=== Architectural components of the temple ===
==== Foundations ====
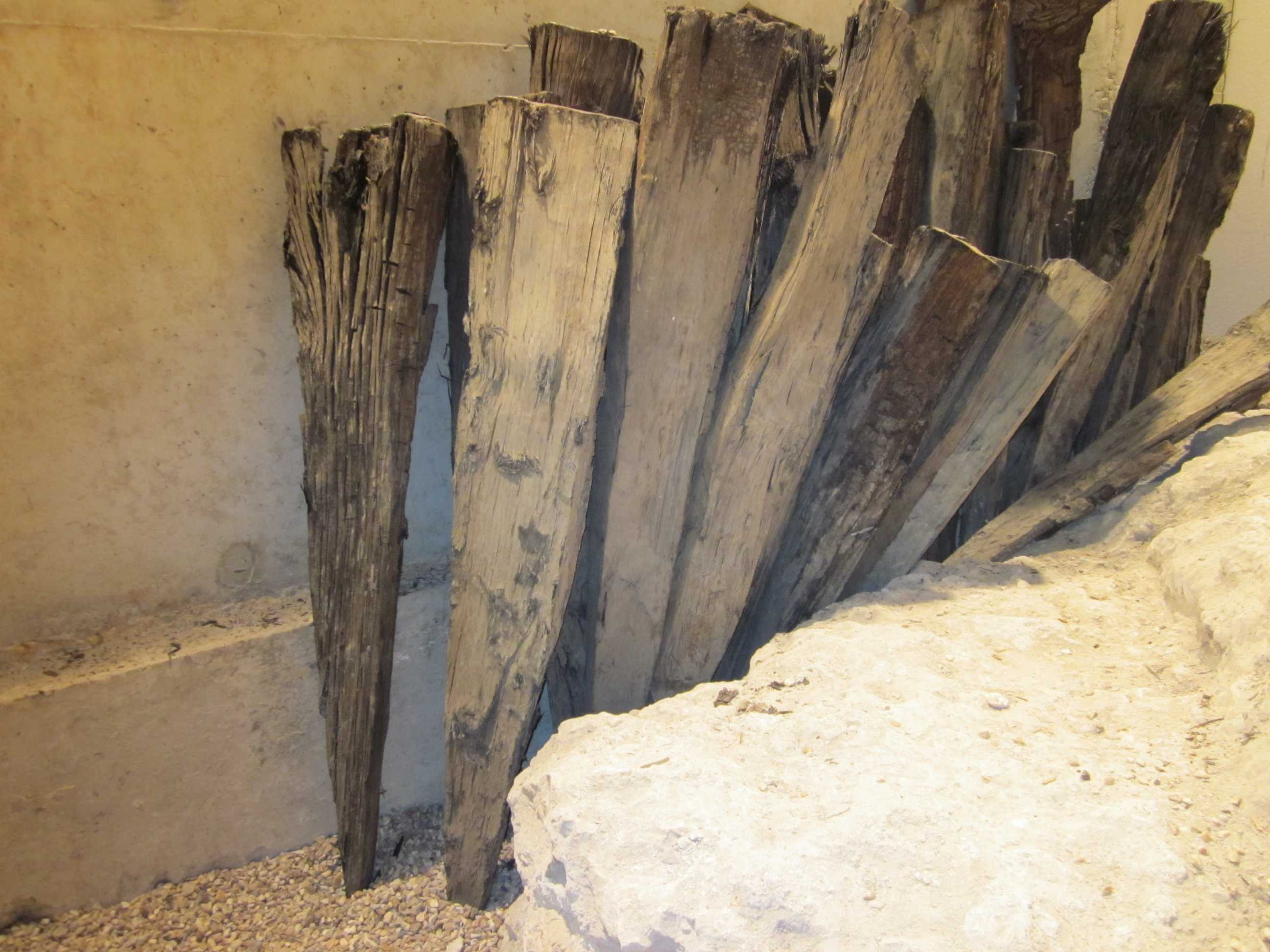
Wooden piles from the temple foundations.

Schematic cross-section of the temple foundations.

The foundations are established on a dense arrangement of oak piles, (Note: The use of wooden piles as a foundation base in wet areas was a widespread practice in antiquity. In Tours, where the water table was only a few meters below the surface, it is confirmed for the foundations of a public thermal establishment (Galinié 2007, pp. 159–169) and is presumed for other constructions, including the Late Empire fortifications (Galinié 2007, pp. 247–255).) with an average density of 15 piles per square meter, placed within a trench. The gaps between the piles are filled with liquid clay to hold them in place and prevent the formation of air pockets that would be detrimental to their preservation. These piles have a square cross-section of approximately 30 cm and measure between 1.50 and 2 meters in length. (Note: Galinié 2007, p. 192) Their tips are carved into an elongated, four-sided pyramid shape. Some of the piles, taken from trunks of large diameters, were split with an axe and then smoothed with a saw before use. The preservation state is such that fragments of moss and lichen sometimes still adhere to the bark. Nine hundred of these piles were extracted during the 1994 excavations; the total number of piles supporting the temple’s foundations is estimated at 9,400. A waterproofing layer made of mortar containing tile fragments caps the ends of the piles. A 1.80-meter-thick masonry mass covers this entire arrangement. This mass is much wider than the walls’ elevation, as is generally the case. It serves as the base for the structure, but its layout seems irregular and does not strictly follow the assigned shape of the monument. (Note: In the captions of photographs taken in 1951 and presented in the Mérimée database of the Ministry of Culture, the foundation ring of the cella is mistakenly interpreted as a step structure providing access to the temple. The existence of the "monumental portico" mentioned in the notice is not referenced in any subsequent publication. Finally, the "room flanking the cella to the west" is likely, given the announced dimensions, the pronaos, which is not located to the west but to the east of the cella ("Le temple païen de Tours" [The Pagan Temple of Tours]. Notice No. IA00071592, on the open heritage platform, base Mérimée, French Ministry of Culture (in French). Archived from the original on May 5, 2019.).)

The entire temple appears to rest on this type of foundation, designed to support heavy loads, except for the access staircase to the pronaos, whose foundation masonry mass rests directly on the ground.

==== Pronaos ====
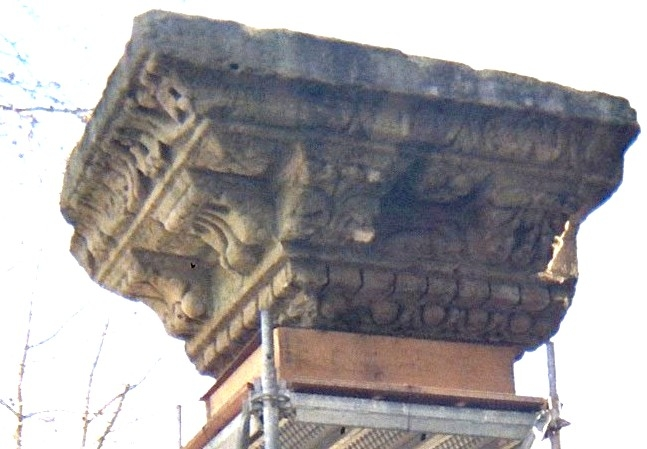
Fragment of cornice attributed to the pronaos of the temple (2.70 × 2.70 × 0.70 m). Coll. Société d'Archéologie de Tirlemont (SAT).

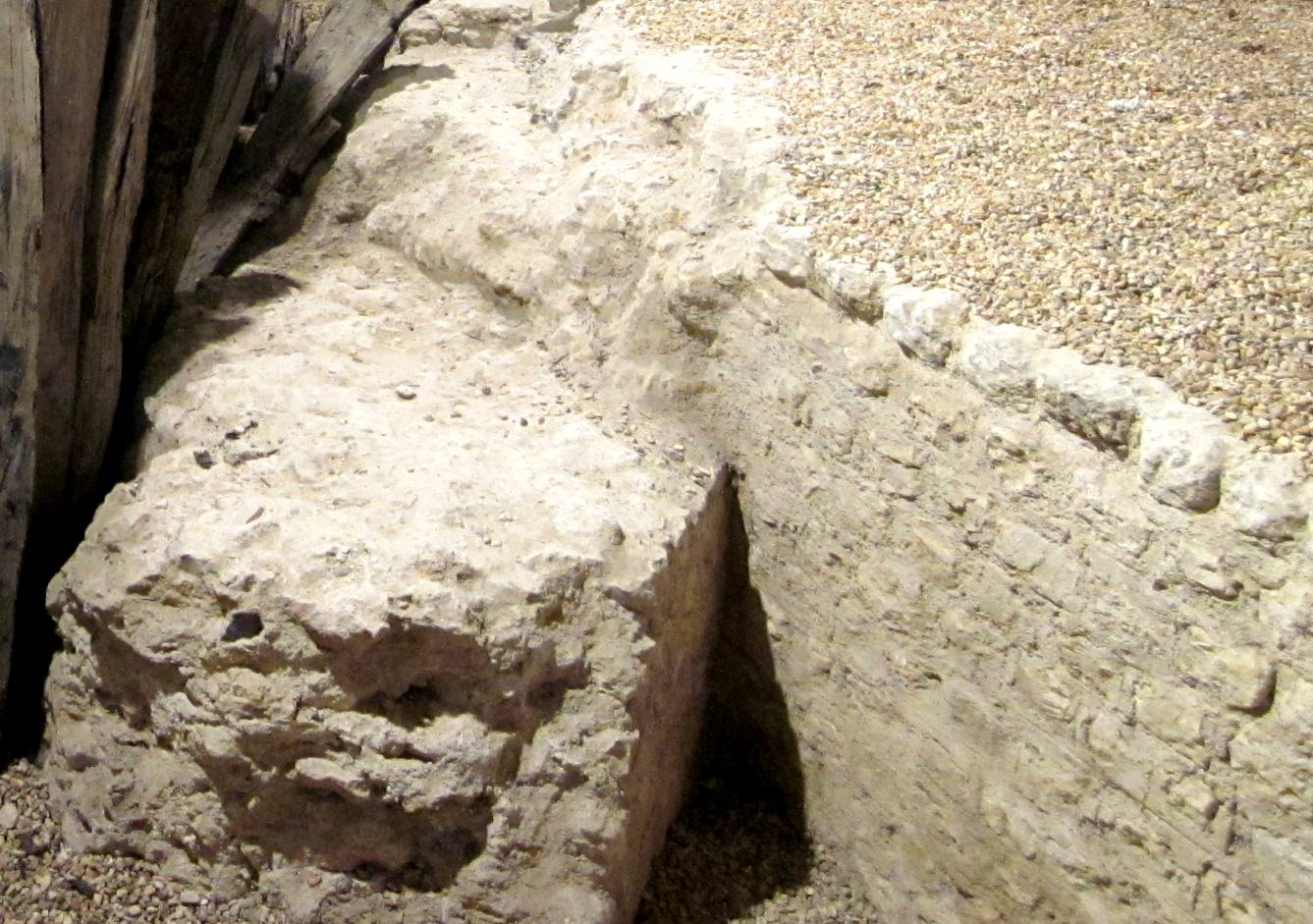
Beginning of the south wall of the pronaos, in contact with the cella.

The temple’s cella opens to the east onto a pronaos (also called a propylon), following a fairly classical layout for this type of grand monument. In his initial surveys, Raoul Lehoux referred to this part of the building as the "opisthodome," believing the temple opened to the west and that he had identified its rear section. The pronaos measures 27.50 meters in width, with a depth ranging from 7.50 meters at its center—aligned with the presumed entrance to the cella—to 10.40 meters at the side walls of the pronaos. (Note: This depth variation is due to the curvature of the cella wall.) It forms a raised podium, 2.20 meters high, built on a masonry mass and accessible by a straight staircase of 11 steps, probably enclosed by side walls. The top of this podium marks the circulation level for the pronaos and the cella. Fragments of column drums and Corinthian-style capitals found nearby, as well as reused within the foundations of Tours’ Gallo-Roman enclosure, are attributed to this part of the temple. (Note: Galinié 2007, p. 195) The pronaos was, in all likelihood, topped by a triangular pediment resting on a series of columns adorning its façade. However, the state of preservation of the column remains—around thirty in total—does not allow for precise measurements, making it impossible to determine their exact number (either six or eight). (Note: Galinié 2007, p. 193) The total height of the pronaos, at the peak of the pediment, is estimated at 18.60 meters above ground level, or 16.40 meters above the podium, with its roof consisting of tiles covering a wooden framework and slats.

==== Cella ====
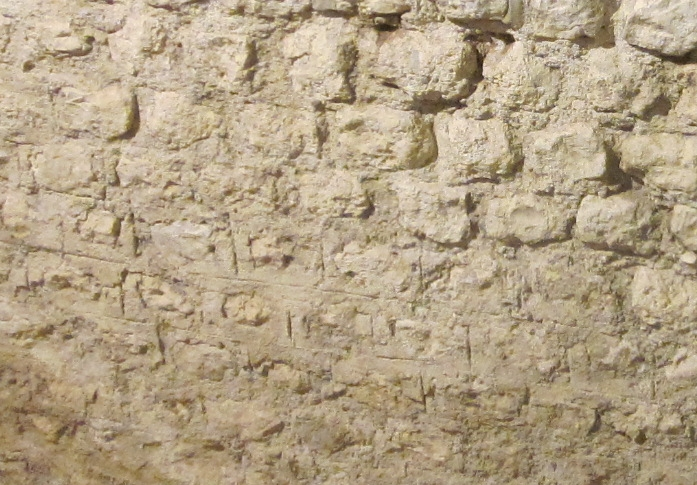
Detail of the masonry of the cella.

The leveling of the walls—when the temple was discovered in 1951, they were identified to a height of 3 meters —makes any hypotheses about the height of the cella, the presence or absence of windows, and the type of roofing very uncertain. However, this cella was likely at least as tall as the pronaos it supported, which would give it a height of at least 20 meters above ground level. The inner diameter of this circular sanctuary is estimated at 29.50 meters, and the wall thickness reaches 2.65 meters. The wall’s structure is typical, with two facings of small limestone rubble stones without brick courses (opus vittatum) enclosing a core of irregularly shaped stones embedded in mortar, with the joints between the stones accentuated with iron tools; masonry cellae are the standard for this type of building. No peripheral ambulatory gallery around the cella, such as those found in Périgueux or Cahors, has been identified in Tours, which distinguishes this temple from other large Gallo-Roman circular sanctuaries. This type of circular cella temple without a surrounding gallery was already noted as very rare in 1993 by Isabelle Fauduet. The floor of the cella is covered with large slabs measuring approximately 0.60 meters per side; their imprint was observed in 1952 on a layer of pink mortar covering the concrete foundation that formed the cella’s floor. The decoration of the walls is unknown, as the many small fragments of marble found in the dark earth covering the temple cannot be definitively attributed to it; they could originate from nearby buildings. However, it is conceivable that the inner walls of the cella were covered, at least to a certain height, with a veneer of polychrome marble.

Finally, its roofing remains a mystery: a wooden roof structure to match the diameter of the cella (about thirty meters) seems difficult to conceive given the technical means available at the time. A stone dome, similar to the one in the Pantheon of Rome, could have been considered, but the relatively thin walls (three times thinner than those in Rome) make this hypothesis unlikely, especially since such a structure has never been identified in any Gallo-Roman circular temples. One last possibility remains: an open-air temple, meaning a cella without a roof, in which case its walls might not have been pierced by windows, and lighting would have come naturally from above. (Note: Galinié 2007, p. 196)

==== Temple environment ====
The temple appears to be set within a peribolus enclosed by the four previously mentioned streets, covering an area of approximately 7,000 square meters, of which 1,200 square meters are occupied by the temple itself. However, this layout has not been formally identified, except perhaps to the north and west of the temple for a few meters and at its southeast corner. Possibly, light structures accompanied the temple, such as service buildings and housing for priests.

The space in front of the pronaos staircase was probably covered with a thick layer of coarse sand, intended to level the ground surface. This sand layer was then covered with limestone slabs, some of which were still in place during the excavations. Two masonry bases, which likely supported statues or altars, were positioned in front of the staircase.

=== Temple chronology ===
==== Construction ====
Two dendrochronological studies conducted on the foundation piles agree that the trees were felled in the spring of the year 39. However, other evidence suggests a later construction date: an as (coin) of Domitian, minted in 82, was found embedded in mortar layers and stone fragments reminiscent of a construction site; the style of the decorative elements found aligns more closely with those popular at the end of the 1st century; and the temple seems to have been built in a previously urbanized area. These archaeological indicators suggest that construction of the temple may not have begun until the end of the 1st century. In the last quarter of this century, the monumental adornment of Caesarodunum appears to have been established, (Note: Galinié 2007, pp. 325–326) with many fanas being built in Gaul, particularly those with a circular cella layout. This discrepancy between the two dating hypotheses remains unexplained. It is unlikely that the foundation piles could have dried for at least 50 years before being used. It is also inconceivable that the piles were reused materials taken from several dismantled or demolished monuments. The construction of the temple did not occur over several decades. A final, more technical hypothesis has been proposed: since the same inconsistency is observed for other ancient monuments in Tours and archaeological dates are firmly established, the reference framework used by laboratories is possibly incorrectly calibrated. In this case, the "late" dating of the temple suggested by archaeology should be favored over the "early" dating indicated by dendrochronology.

==== Abandonment and destruction ====
Field studies have provided no information on the period or circumstances of the temple’s abandonment; no demolition layer was observed, and the black soils of the Early Middle Ages directly sealed the leveled remains of the temple in the excavated areas. However, given that elements attributed to the temple were found reused in the Late Empire fortifications, built in the first half of the 4th century, it seems likely that by the end of the 3rd century, the temple had been dismantled or was close to being dismantled, like most of the High Empire monuments in Tours. The site was briefly used as a necropolis, with eight pits and thirteen inhumations in open ground recorded between the 6th and 8th centuries, probably unrelated to its original religious function. (Note: Galinié 2007, p. 197)

The reasons for the temple's abandonment remain unknown. Several unverified hypotheses are plausible, including the rise of Christianity leading to the gradual neglect of the sanctuary, with evangelization accompanied by the destruction of pagan symbols—such episodes occurred in Touraine during the episcopate of Martin, as recounted by Gregory of Tours. Another possibility is the financial inability to maintain the temple.

However, the monument does not seem to have completely vanished from the landscape in the Middle Ages. In 1363 and 1364, city records mention the extraction of stones from its foundations and sanctuary for the new fortified enclosure of Tours, then under construction. (Note: Bedon, Chevallier & Pinon 1988, p. 128) Additionally, the construction of a tower from this enclosure, called the "Tour Chièvre," built later between 1470 and 1473, was supported by the southern return of the leveled wall of the pronaos. (Note: Galinié 2007, pp. 304–307)

== The large circular temple ==
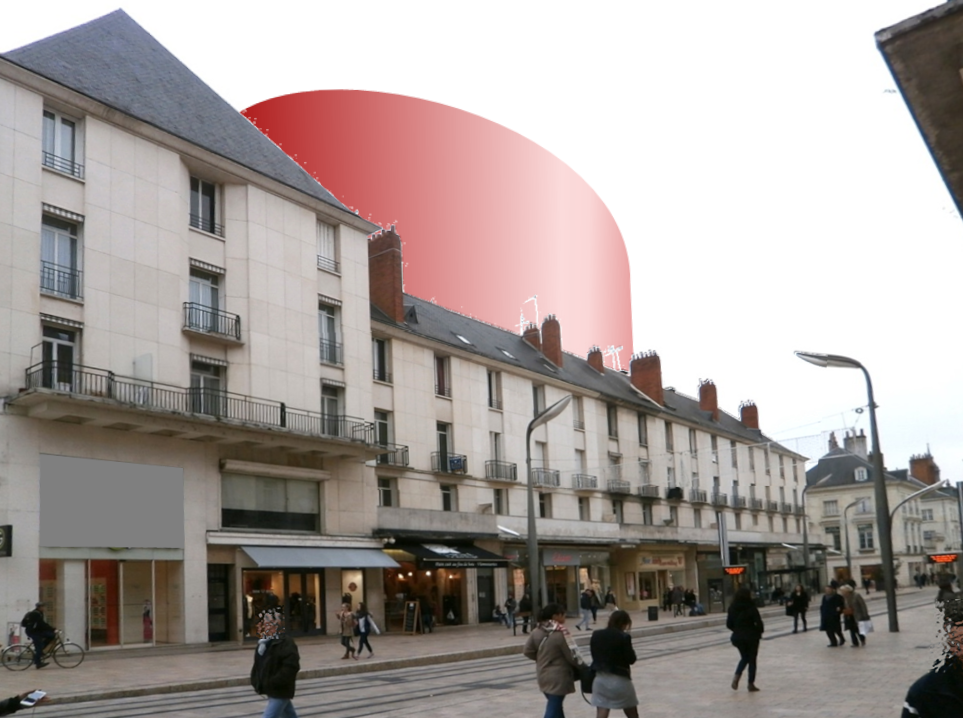
Hypothesis of restitution of the silhouette of the cella (sanctuary) of the temple in a contemporary view of the neighborhood. (Note: The diameter of the cella and its positioning are a graphical transcription, as faithful as possible, of the archaeological data available in 2014. Its height and appearance are purely speculative.)

The construction of a temple with such a circular cella poses significant architectural challenges, particularly concerning the roof. Cultic motives likely dictated this architectural choice; the possible absence of a roof would not have hindered the temple’s proper functioning.

As of the research conducted up to the beginning of the third millennium, no archaeological remains provide the slightest clue regarding the deity or deities to whom the temple may have been dedicated. Only a fragment of an inscription, considered a dedication, was found in the dark earth sealing the temple's remains. The three letters of this supposed dedication—S F L—are too insufficient to be of any use, and there is no certainty that the dedication from which they originate relates to the temple. (Note: Galinié 2007, pp. 194 & 196) The temple’s shape and architecture offer no insight: nowhere in Roman Gaul has the form of temples been linked to the worship practices conducted within them. (Note: Fauduet 1993, pp. 151–152)

Questions regarding the architectural choice and the temple’s purpose therefore remain entirely unanswered. (Note: The same questions arise regarding the temple in Cahors; for Périgueux, while the Tower of Vésone seems to be dedicated to the worship of Vesunna, the tutelary goddess of the ancient city, the choice of a temple with a circular cella is unexplained.)

== Studies and remains ==
=== Discovery and archaeological studies ===
The city accounts from 1363 and 1364 mention, without further geographical details, that elements from the temple were taken to build the medieval enclosure; it is therefore possible that this temple was located near the enclosure. In 1894, Charles de Grandmaison, upon discovering a monumental cornice west of Rue Nationale, attributed it to a temple. However, he concluded that the monument itself was located on that side of the street and that the cornice had been reused in the foundations of a structure built after the temple.

On June 19, 1940, German artillery batteries positioned on the hillside overlooking the right bank of the Loire, opposite Tours, opened fire on the city. A fire broke out, devastating 12 hectares of buildings in the neighborhoods of Tours near the Loire, on both sides of Rue Nationale.

Figure I: Map showing the location of the temple (Note: This figure was developed based on data collected in Audin 2002, p. 50, Jouquand et al. 2002, p. 33 and Rodier, Bisson & Thomas 1995, p. 41.) Supposed ancient roads Known remains Certified route Restored route (1) cella - (2) pronaos - (3) peribolos.

The war over, the clearing of rubble began with an imperative from the Ministry of Reconstruction and Urban Planning: rebuild as quickly as possible to rehouse the victims. A complete consolidation of the area was decided, preceded by the leveling of ruins and the flattening of the ground. It was on this occasion, in July 1951, along the eastern edge of Rue Nationale, between Rue Émile-Zola and Rue de la Scellerie, that an imposing curved wall of small masonry blocks of Gallo-Roman origin was discovered—perhaps the cella of an ancient temple whose existence was known but not its location. Emergency excavations were then carried out in the area under the direction of Raoul Lehoux, then curator of the Société Archéologique de Touraine’s museum. These excavations confirmed this hypothesis, even though other functions were proposed for these remains: a nymphaeum, a water tower, or a mausoleum. The excavations made it possible to calculate the interior diameter of the cella—29 meters—and to observe that it was preceded, to the east, by a pronaos, the whole structure enclosed within a peribolos of about one hectare, bordered by Rue Nationale, Rue de la Scellerie, Rue de Lucé, and Rue Émile-Zola. Despite last-minute attempts to preserve these remains, (Note: The debate regarding the preservation of the temple's remains even took on a polemical tone, with part of the population, led by the organization in charge of reconstruction, accusing the archaeologists—branded as "archaeomaniacs"—of opposing the necessary and urgent restoration of the city. The prefect of Indre-et-Loire himself, though using more moderate terms, adopted the same position.) mechanical shovels and dynamite destroyed nearly the entire uncovered wall. Only a portion was preserved underground, accessible to researchers, as the building was classified as a historical monument by decree on November 23, 1953. (Note: Galinié 2007, p. 187)

Restructuring work in this neighborhood began in 1994. Archaeologists were then surprised to discover that remains of the temple, which had unexpectedly escaped the destructions of the 1950s, were still in place. An emergency rescue excavation was therefore carried out in two stages, focusing on the southern and southeastern parts of the temple’s footprint; its wooden pile foundations were uncovered, along with some elements attributable to the internal decoration of its cella.

In 2000, a survey conducted a little further east along Rue de Lucé revealed a road serving the temple, which could be identified as the cardo maximus of the city, as well as a possible building between this street and the temple. (Note: Galinié 2007, p. 191)

The construction of the Nouvel Olympia, a cultural complex housing, among other things, the Regional Dramatic Center and set to be built directly above the temple, began with an excavation campaign in 2001-2002. This final operation provided fairly precise data on the structure and layout of the temple’s pronaos, whose access staircase was almost completely uncovered.

The work undertaken in 2010 during the construction of the first tramway line, and in 2011 for the city center, uncovered, beneath Rue Nationale, an "old road used throughout Antiquity, following the current alignment of the street." No remains of the temple or its peribolos were discovered on this occasion. Still, this ancient road, whose existence had long been only a working hypothesis, naturally established itself as a physical western boundary to the sanctuary’s footprint.

=== Temple remains ===
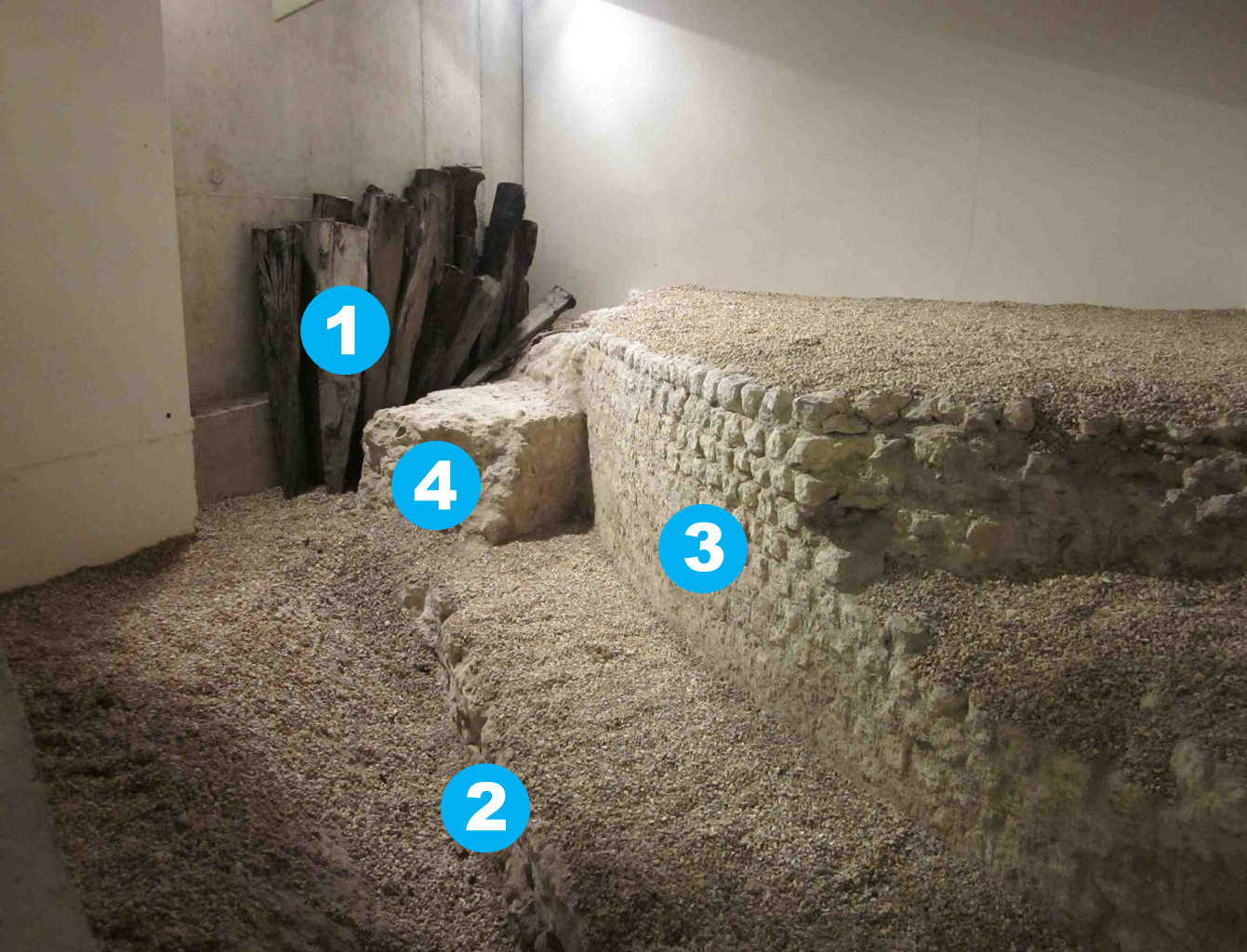
Figure II: Remains of the temple in situ: (1) uprooted foundation piles; (2) ring of the cella foundation; (3) wall of the cella; (4) side wall of the pronaos.

The remains of this temple are very rare. On-site, only a portion of the cella wall remains, located in an archaeological crypt exclusively accessible to researchers, as stipulated by regulations. (Note: Galinié 2007, p. 189) Other remains can be observed in the underground areas of a pharmacy: (1) foundation piles extracted from the ground but left in place, (2) part of the masonry ring that served as the base for the elevation of the cella wall, (3) a portion of this wall with its external facing preserved, and (4) the start of the pronaos’s southern lateral wall (the numbers in parentheses refer to the markers in Figure II). It is, however, likely that other, yet-to-be-inventoried remains persist beneath the buildings constructed in this urban block.

By cross-referencing the results of the various excavation campaigns and observations carried out at the temple site, Anne-Marie Jouquand et al. were able to propose a hypothetical reconstruction of the monument’s plan.

Several elements attributed to the temple’s decor, including a monumental fragment of a cornice, have been collected in the collections of the Société Archéologique de Touraine. For technical reasons, these collections could not be made accessible to the public in 2014.

Following an investigation initiated in 1974, the temple’s remains, located in the city’s protected area, (Note: In the protected "Level A" area of Tours, where the temple's remains are located, any work affecting buildings (demolition, construction, development), apart from those involving roofs and the cleaning of recent buildings—regardless of their significance—must be subject to a prior request to the regional prefect for "instructions and potential archaeological prescriptions.") were added to the General inventory of cultural heritage on December 6, 1991.

== See also ==
- Caesarodunum
- Tours

== Bibliography ==
=== Documents on the archaeology and/or history of Tours ===
- Audin, Pierre (2002). Tours à l'époque gallo-romaine [Towers in the Gallo-Roman era] (in French). Saint-Cyr-sur-Loire: Alan Sutto. ISBN 2-8425-3748-3.
- Chevalier, Bernard (1985). Histoire de Tours [History of Tours]. Univers de la France et des pays francophones (in French). Toulouse: Privat. ISBN 2-7089-8224-9.
- Croubois, Claude (1986). L'indre-et-Loire – La Touraine, des origines à nos jours [Indre-et-Loire – Touraine, from its origins to the present day]. L’histoire par les documents (in French). Saint-Jean-d’Angely: Bordessoules. ISBN 2-9035-0409-1.
- Ferdière, Alain; Fouillet, Nicolas; Jouquand, Anne-Marie; Rodier, Xavier; Seigne, Jacques (2014). "Discordances chronologiques à Tours aux Ier et IIe s. apr. J.-C. : questions posées à l'archéologie et à la dendrochronologie" [Chronological discrepancies at Tours in the 1st and 2nd centuries AD: questions for archaeology and dendrochronology]. ArcheoSciences (in French). 38 (38): 151–163. doi:10.4000/archeosciences.4240.
- Galinié, Henri (2007). Tours antique et médiéval. Lieux de vie, temps de la ville. 40 ans d'archéologie urbaine, Supplément à la RACF n° 30, numéro spécial de la collection Recherches sur Tours [Ancient and medieval towers. Living spaces, city times. 40 years of urban archaeology, Supplement to RACF No. 30, special issue of the Recherches sur Tours collection] (in French). Tours: FERACF. ISBN 978-2-9132-7215-6.
- Jouquand, Anne-Marie; Neury, Patrick; Trébuchet, Émilie; Wittmann, Alain (2002). "Nouvelles données sur le temple de Tours : fouilles du Centre Dramatique Régional (ancien cinéma Olympia-rue de Lucé)" [New information about the Temple of Tours: excavations at the Centre Dramatique Régional (former Olympia cinema on rue de Lucé)]. Bulletin de la Société archéologique de Touraine (in French). XLVIII. Joué-lès-Tours: 27–34. doi:10.4000/archeosciences.4240.
- Jouquand, Anne-Marie; Lorans, Élisabeth; Seigne, Jacques (2024). Tours. Carte archéologique de la Gaule (in French). Paris: Académie des inscriptions et belles-lettres and Maison des Sciences de l'Homme. ISBN 978-2-8775-4703-1.
- Lehoux, Raoul (1952). Communication faite le 30 octobre 1952 à la Société archéologique de Touraine par Monsieur R. Lehoux, conservateur du Musée archéologique de Touraine, et Directeur des Fouilles du Temple romain [Communication made on October 30, 1952, to the Société archéologique de Touraine by Mr. R. Lehoux, curator of the Musée archéologique de Touraine and director of the excavations at the Roman temple] (in French). Tours.
- Provost, Michel (1988). Académie des inscriptions et belles-lettres [Archaeological map of Gaul - Indre-et-Loire-37] (in French). Paris. ISBN 2-8775-4002-2.
- Rodier, Xavier; Bisson, Danielle; Thomas, Frédéric (1995). "Un temple antique, rue Émile-Zola" [An ancient temple, rue Émile-Zola]. À propos d'archéologie urbaine (in French) (11): 32–41.

=== Documents totally or partially devoted to architecture and town planning in the Roman Empire ===
- Bedon, Robert; Chevallier, Raymond; Pinon, Pierre (1988). Architecture et urbanisme en Gaule romaine : l'architecture et la ville [Architecture and urban planning in Roman Gaul: architecture and the city]. Les Hespérides (in French). Vol. 1. Errance. ISBN 2-9034-4279-7.
- Coulon, Gérard (2006). Les Gallo-Romains [The Gallo-Romans]. Civilisations et cultures (in French). Paris: Errance. ISBN 2-8777-2331-3.
- Duby, Georges (1980). Histoire de la France urbaine [History of Urban France]. L’univers historique (in French). Vol. 1: La ville antique, des origines au IXe siècle. Paris: le Seuil. ISBN 2-0200-5590-2.
- Fauduet, Isabelle (1993). Les temples de tradition celtique en Gaule romaine [The temples of Celtic tradition in Roman Gaul] (in French). Paris: Errance. ISBN 2-87772-074-8.
