= Société archéologique de Touraine =

Public utility from Touraine

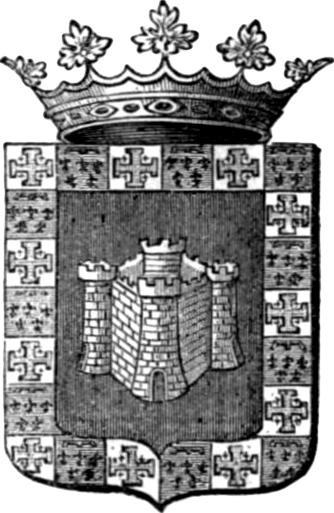
- Seal of the Société archéologique de Touraine.
- Abbreviation: SAT
- Founder: Henry Goüin, Alexandre Giraudet, Noël Champoiseau, and François Manceau abbey
- Region served: Tours, France
- Official language: French
- Secretary General: Gilbert Wycke
- Website: https://www.societearcheotouraine.eu

The Société archéologique de Touraine (Archaeological Society of Touraine, SAT by its acronym in French), founded in 1840 and recognized as a public utility in 1872, welcomes all those, amateurs or curious, students or professionals, who are interested in, work towards, or wish to contribute to the study, defense, and illustration of the history and heritage of Touraine.

== History ==
On June 23, 1840, members from Tours of the Société française pour la conservation des monuments historiques (now the Société française d'archéologie) gathered in commission (banker Henry Goüin (1782–1861), physician Alexandre Giraudet (1797–1863), industrialist Noël Champoiseau (1795–1859), and abbot François Manceau (1805–1855) to develop and present the statutes of a new association at a public meeting. The first board had Henry Goüin as president, Alexandre Giraudet as general secretary, Abbot Manceau as deputy general secretary, and Louis-Pierre Boilleau (1792–1872, archaeologist, founder of the archaeological museum of Tours) as treasurer-archivist. The society then had 35 full members, 43 correspondents, and 9 honorary members, including Arcisse de Caumont, François Guizot, and Prosper Mérimée.

It was recognized as a public utility in June 1872 by Jules Simon, Ministry of National Education, thanks to Charles de Grandmaison, the 7th president of the society.

Its collections, comprising more than 30,000 pieces, the result of donations from members and purchases, span from prehistory to contemporary times, mostly related to Touraine. They are displayed at the Hôtel Goüin in Tours, donated by the Goüin family to the society in the 20th century, which became the society's museum since the late 1960s and was sold for a symbolic franc to the General Council of Indre-et-Loire in 1977, due to a lack of means for its maintenance. The archaeological and art collections that were gathered there were handed over to the General Council, as a deposit for thirty years. Part of these collections will be exhibited at the Hôtel Goüin, when the museum reopens after its ongoing reorganization in 2014; part of the prehistory collections is transferred to the Museum of Prehistory of Grand-Pressigny.

During the 20th century, the society also had its headquarters in the Hôtel de Jean Galland, which it was able to acquire thanks to a donation from André Goüin.

Having become the owner of the former Saint-Libert chapel in 2011, it had it restored and fitted out with the aim of making it its headquarters as well as a privileged space for work, meetings, and exhibitions. All work completed, the inauguration of the chapel took place in May 2016. The Société archéologique de Touraine adopted a new logo; in 2014, it had more than 580 members. After the purchase and renovation, the society inaugurated in October 2022 the Library of the History of Touraine (BHT).

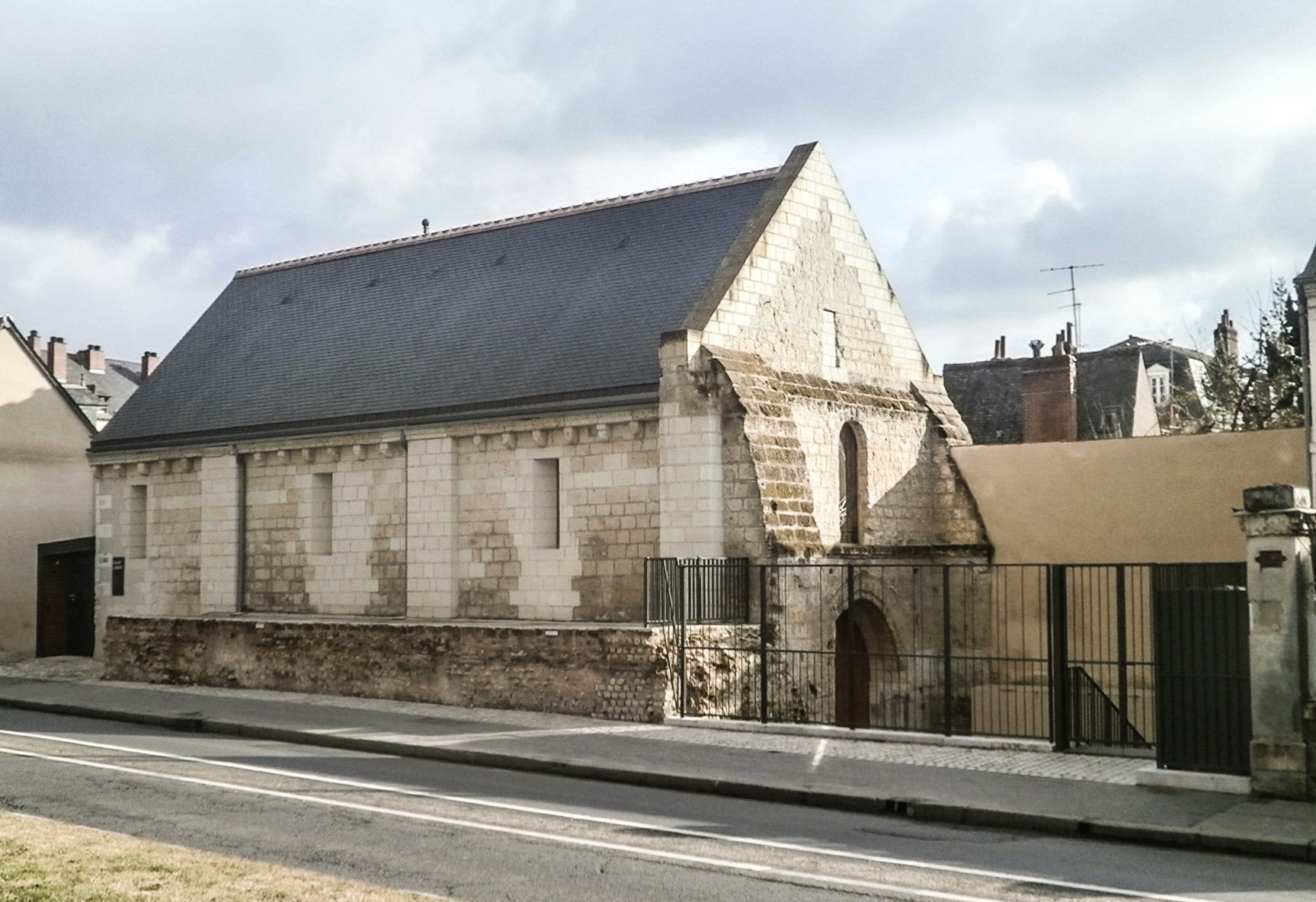
The Saint-Libert chapel, in Tours, is the workspace of the Society.

=== List of SAT presidents ===
From 1840 to 2017, 32 presidents have succeeded each other at the head of the SAT.

- 1840–1845: Henry Goüin
- 1845–1848: Noël Champoiseau
- 1848–1853: Charles Mourain de Sourdeval
- 1853–1859: Abbot Jean-Jacques Bourassé
- 1859–1862: Henry Lambron de Lignim
- 1862–1868: Abbot Jean-Jacques Bourassé
- 1868–1871: Charles de Grandmaison
- 1871–1875: Abbot Casimir Chevalier
- 1875–1878: Alfred Boulay de la Meurthe
- 1878–1883: Abbot Augustin-Hubert Juteau
- 1883–1889: Léon Palustre
- 1889–1892: Joseph Delaville Le Roulx
- 1892–1894: Léon Palustre
- 1895–1901: Canon Louis-Auguste Bossebœuf
- 1901–1904: Henry Faye
- 1904–1910: Louis de Grandmaison
- 1910–1917: Édouard Gatian de Clérambault
- 1917–1919: Charles Bonnin de La Bonninière de Beaumont
- 1919–1926: Alfred Boulay de la Meurthe
- 1926–1932: Canon Victor Guignard
- 1932–1938: Émile Roque
- 1938–1940: Louis de Grandmaison
- 1940–1949: Dr. Robert Ranjard
- 1949–1954: Robert Milliat
- 1954: Léopold Bariller
- 1955–1961: Albert Philippon
- 1961–1967: Pierre Leveel
- 1967–1970: Pierre Boille
- 1970–1976: Eugène Pépin
- 1976–1979: Pierre Leveel
- 1979–1985: Pierre Boille
- 1985–1991: Jacques Dubois
- 1991–1997: Dr. Jean Moreau
- 1997–2003: General Jean-Jacques Montigaud
- 2003–2009: Alain Jacquet
- 2009–2015: Yves Cogoluègnes
- 2015–2018: Philippe Rouillac
- 2018–2021: Yves Cogoluègnes
- 2021–2022: Michel Rapoport
- 2022–*: Yves Cogoluègnes
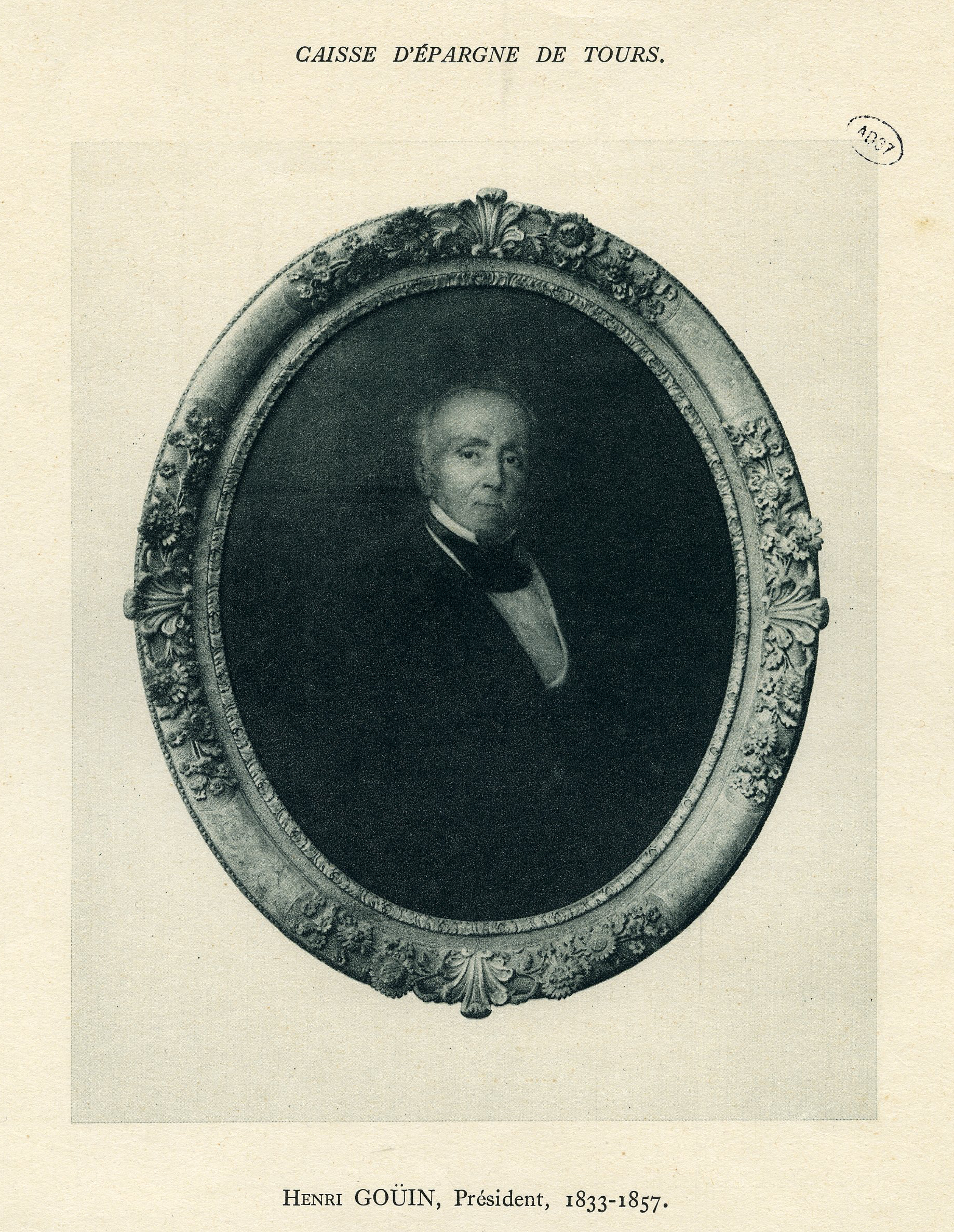
  Henri Goüin (1840-1845)
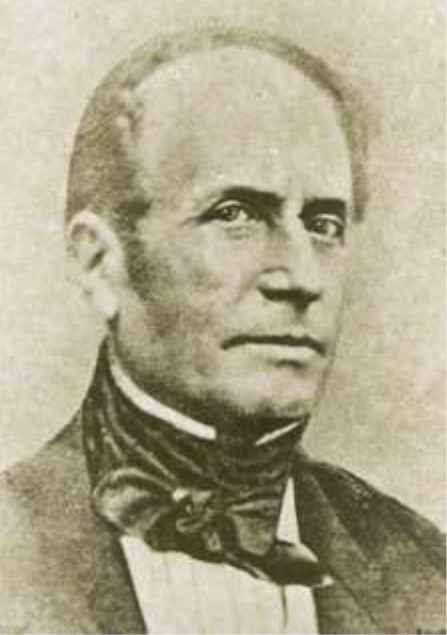
  Noël Champoiseau (1845-1848)
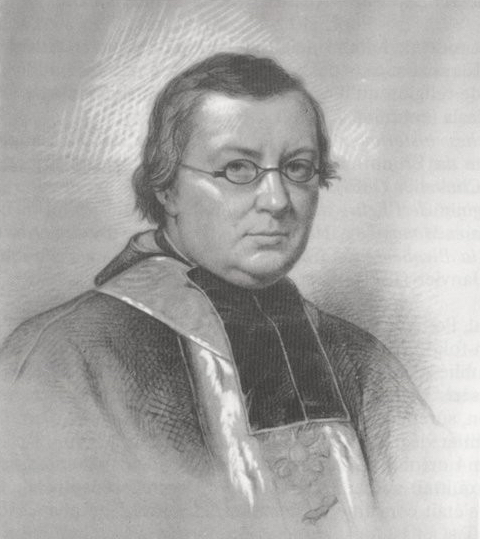
  Jean-Jacques Bourassé (1853-1859, 1862-1868)
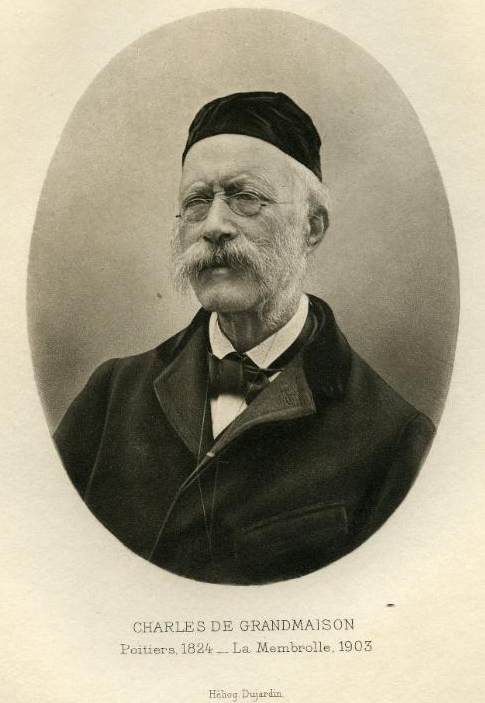
  Charles de Gransmaison (1868-1871)
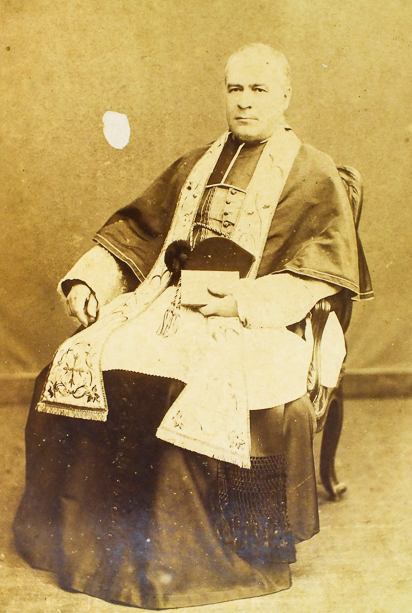
  Augustin-Hubert Juteau
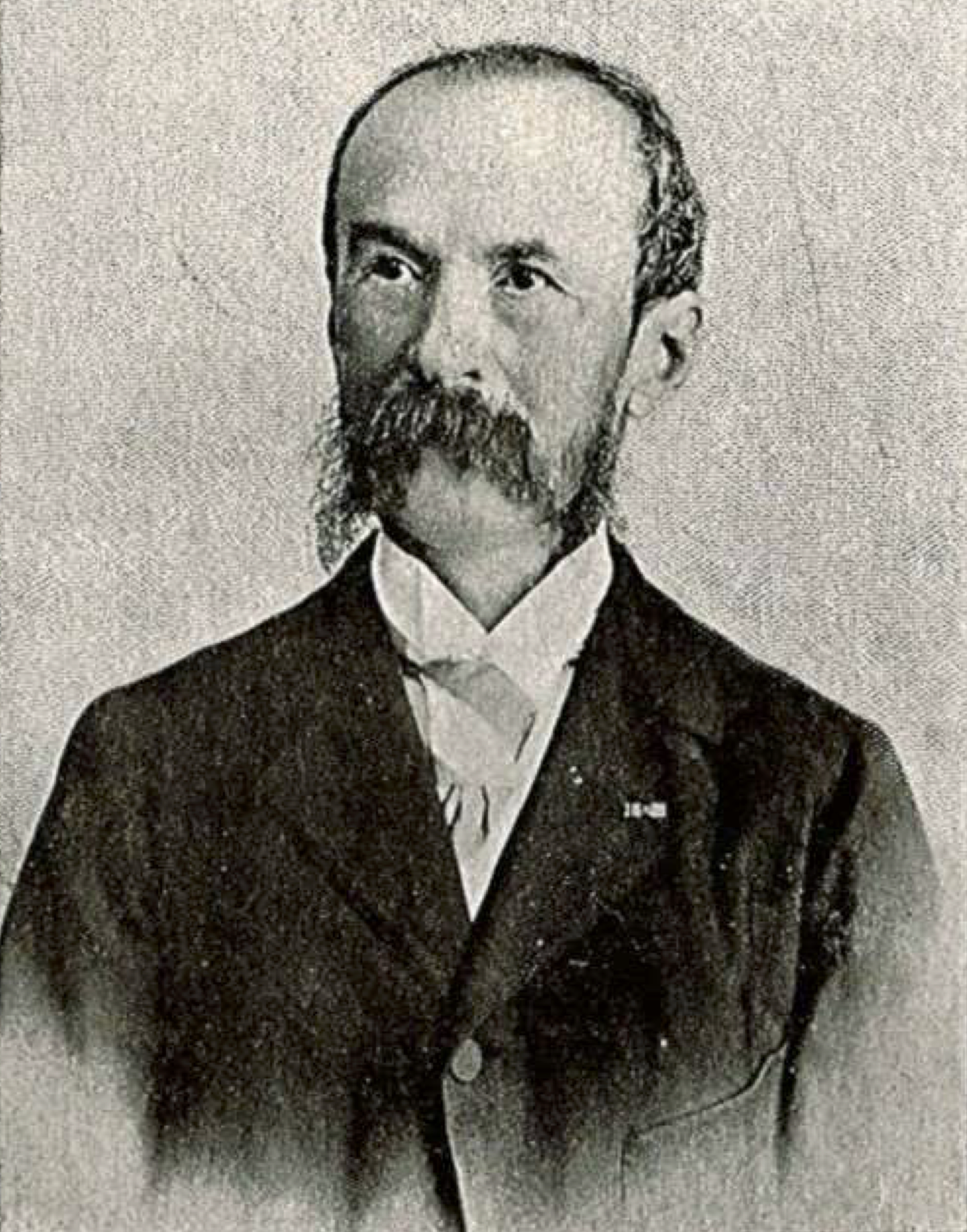
  León Palustre (1883-1889, 1892-1894)

== Objectives ==
The Société archéologique de Touraine organizes a session at the end of each month during which scholarly communications concerning Touraine are presented to members. An annual bulletin, containing the texts of the communications presented during the monthly sessions, is published every year. The society also publishes memoirs, exhibition catalogs, and indexes of its publications, which it sells in its library premises and by correspondence. It organizes outings for its members, allowing them to discover unknown sites and monuments of the local heritage, under the direction of specialists.

The society continues, as in the past, to conserve important collections: old photographs (about 15,000), partly from the archives of the former Société de photographie de Tours (1891–1960), maps and figurative documents, coins (about 4,000), and seals, not to mention books and brochures (about 8,500), hundreds of collections of journals in its study library (infra).

== Library ==
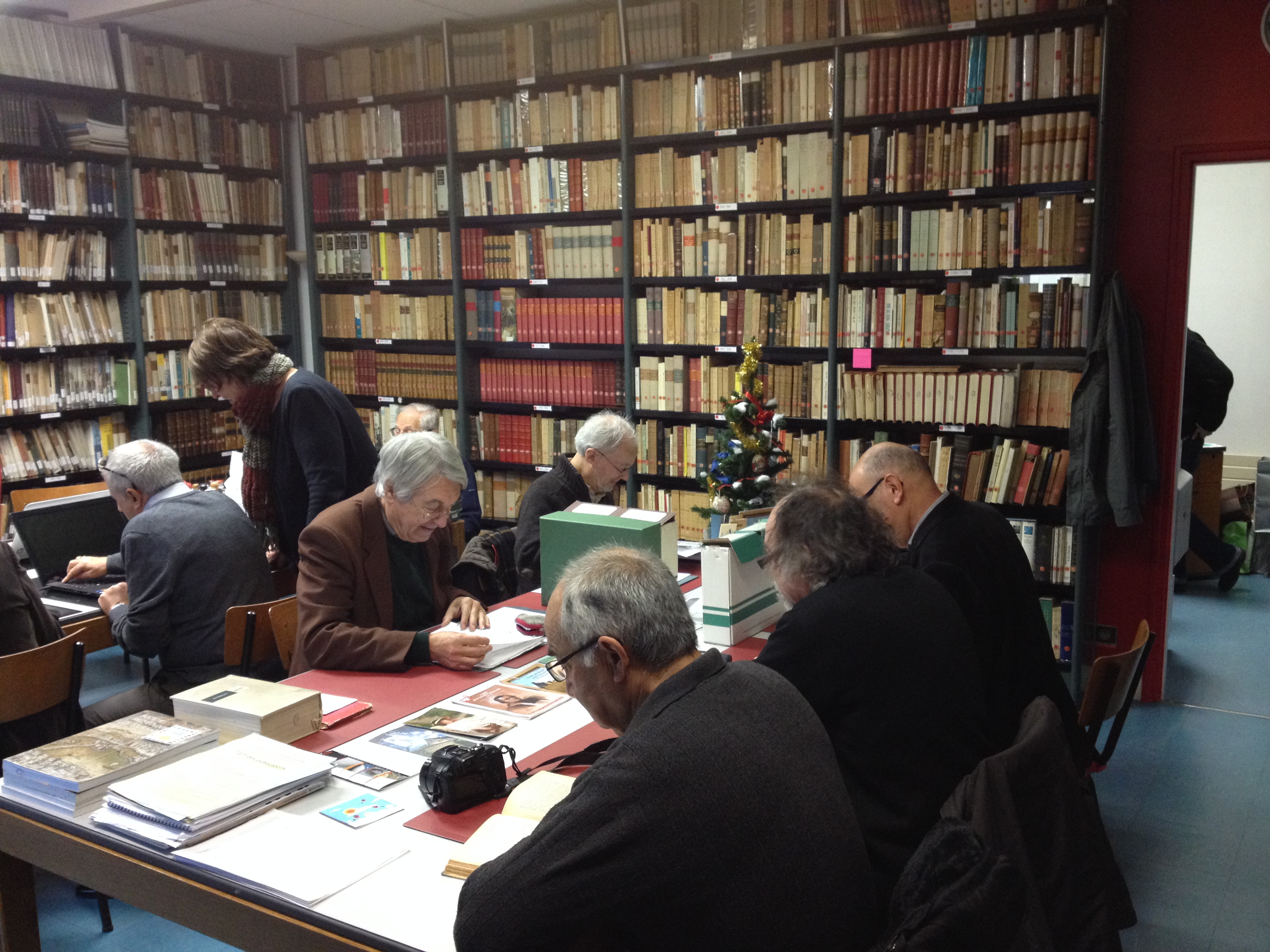
The reading room of the library on the ground floor of the Logis (December 2014).

The society's first study library, created in 1840, was destroyed on June 19, 1940, in the fire of the municipal library of Tours, where it had been deposited in 1909. It has since been reconstituted and relocated in 1958 to the building of the new municipal library, then in 2012 to the ground floor of the Logis des Gouverneurs of the Château de Tours, where the reading room and public reception are located, and in 2016, to its first floor (for 55 m2), which allowed it, on the one hand, to redeploy its collections and repatriate the stock of periodicals still stored at the municipal library, and on the other hand, to expand its workspace and activities. In 2019, the society acquired, at 2 rue des Maures, very close to the Logis des Gouverneurs, a building intended to house the Library of the History of Touraine (BHT). In October 2022, it opened to the public and can accommodate readers on the ground floor and store books on three levels.

Long animated by a team of members around Daniel Schweitz, the library now directed by Florence Cailleau, includes, in addition to the complete collection of memoirs and bulletins published by the society since 1840, about 11,000 books and brochures dealing mainly with the history, archaeology, and heritage of Touraine and neighboring provinces, and a collection of private archives. Access is free to any authorized researcher or reader in the reading room, where they can find the necessary assistance from the librarian. The society's publications are also consultable in several places in Tours: Departmental Archives, Municipal Archives, Central Library for Lending, and the Center for Contemporary Archives of Indre-et-Loire, as well as on Gallica and in various locations in Paris and France. The society's library provides tools for research in its publications. An annual activity report is published in the Bulletin since 2006.

== Bibliography ==
- Collectif (1990). La Société archéologique, 150 ans au service de la Touraine, Société archéologique de Touraine, musée de l'Hôtel Gouïn, exposition 30 juin-26 novembre 1990 (in French). Société archéologique de Touraine.
- Collectif (2010). La SAT, un passé plein d'avenir (in French). Société archéologique de Touraine.
- Audin, Pierre (1993). Au milieu du xixe siècle en Touraine : une société savante face à l'archéologie (in French). Cæsarodunum.
- Lhuillier, Léon. La Société archéologique et son influence en Touraine (in French). Bulletin de la Société archéologique de Touraine.
- Schweitz, Daniel (2010). De la monnaie gauloise au jeton de présence de la Société archéologique de Touraine (1840–1841) (in French). Bulletin de la Société archéologique de Touraine.
- Cogoluègnes, Yves (2020). Les 180 ans de la Société archéologique de Touraine (in French). Bulletin de la Société archéologique de Touraine.
- Zollinger, Monique (2016). Les présidents et officiers de la SAT : table pour une étude prosopographique (in French). Bulletin de la Société archéologique de Touraine.

=== Library of the Society ===
- Schweitz, Daniel (2008). La nouvelle bibliothèque de la Société archéologique de Touraine (1940–2007) (in French). Bulletin de la Société archéologique de Touraine.
- Schweitz, Daniel (2009). La première bibliothèque d'étude de la Société archéologique de Touraine (1840–1940) (in French). Bulletin de la Société archéologique de Touraine.
- Schweitz, Daniel (2009). L'incendie de la Bibliothèque de Tours (juin 1940) (in French). Mémoires de l’Académie des sciences, arts et belles-lettres de Touraine.
- Schweitz, Daniel (2012). Délocalisation de la bibliothèque d'étude de la Société (février-avril 2012) (in French). Bulletin de la Société archéologique de Touraine.
- Schweitz, Daniel (2017). Un outil pour mieux connaître l'histoire et le patrimoine de : la bibliothèque d'étude de archéologique de Touraine (2017) (in French). Bulletin de la Société archéologique de Touraine.
- Schweitz, Daniel (2017). À propos de la fonction de Bibliothécaire (in French). Bulletin de archéologique de Touraine.

=== Research tools ===
- Schweitz, Daniel (2021). Histoire et Patrimoine de la Touraine. Bibliographie élémentaire pour le chercheur et le curieux (in French). Académie des sciences, arts et belles lettres de Touraine.
- Audin, Pierre (2009). 170 ans de bibliographie tourangelle (1840–2009) (in French). Mémoire de la Société archéologique de Touraine.
- Schweitz, Daniel (2020). Histoire et patrimoine de la Touraine. Éléments de bibliographie pour le chercheur et le curieux (2009–2020) (in French). Bulletin de la Société archéologique de Touraine.
- Schweitz, Daniel (2011). Histoire et patrimoine de la Touraine. Introduction aux études locales. Guide du lecteur et du chercheur en bibliothèque (in French). Mémoire de la Société archéologique de Touraine.
- Schweitz, Daniel (2020). Historiens, « antiquaires » et archéologues de la Société archéologique de Touraine. Répertoire biographique et bibliographique (1840–2018) (in French). Mémoires de la Société archéologique de Touraine.
