= Pierre Leveel =

Pierre Marie Marcel Levéel (11 October 1914 - 3 May 2017) was a French historian and professor of history and geography.

He published 160 works and articles, all on Touraine. A full list of his works is on the website of the Société archéologique de Touraine, of which he was vice-president (1955-1961) and president (1961-1967 and 1976-1979).

== Life ==
He was born in Chinon and spent part of his childhood there. After gaining his teaching qualification he taught history and geography at the Lycée Descartes in Tours, France from 1940 to 1964.

He was president of the association des amis de Ronsard and received many distinctions, being made a knight of the Ordre des Arts et des Lettres in 1968, a knight of the Ordre national du Mérite in 1971, and a commander of the Ordre des Palmes académiques in 2012 He died in Tours and in 2007 a roundabout in the Monconseil district in the north of that city was named after him.

== Selected works ==
- Histoire de la Touraine. Que sais-je ?. Paris: Presses universitaires de France. 1967 [1958].
- La Mission de Tallien, représentant du peuple en Indre-et-Loire, mars-août 1793. Mémoires de la Société archéologique de Touraine. SAT. 1958.
- Le partage de la généralité de Tours et la formation du département d’Indre-et-Loire (1789-1790). Mémoires de la Société archéologique de Touraine. SAT. 1964.
- in collaboration with Joseph Thibault (1975). Les Buade de Frontenac entre Touraine et Berry. Chambray-lès-Tours: CLD.
- Histoire de Touraine et d'Indre-et-Loire. Chambray-lès-Tours: CLD. 1988. ISBN 978-2-85443-157-5.
- La Touraine disparue. Chambray-lès-Tours: CLD. 1994. ISBN 2-85443-253-3..
