= René Ouvrard =

French priest, writer and composer

René Ouvrard (1624–1694) was a French priest, writer and composer.

Ouvrard was born in Chinon. He received orders and became kapellmeister of the cathedral of Bordeaux, Narbonne and the Sainte-Chapelle of Paris, then he was a canon in Tours. He became a priest in 1682. He died in Tours.

== Main works ==
- Secret pour composer en musique par un art nouveau, 1660
- L'Art et la Science des nombres en latin et en français, 1677
- Défense de l'ancienne tradition des Églises de France, 1678
- Histoire de la musique chez les Hébreux, les Grecs et les Romains
