= Chinon =

- Subprefecture and commune
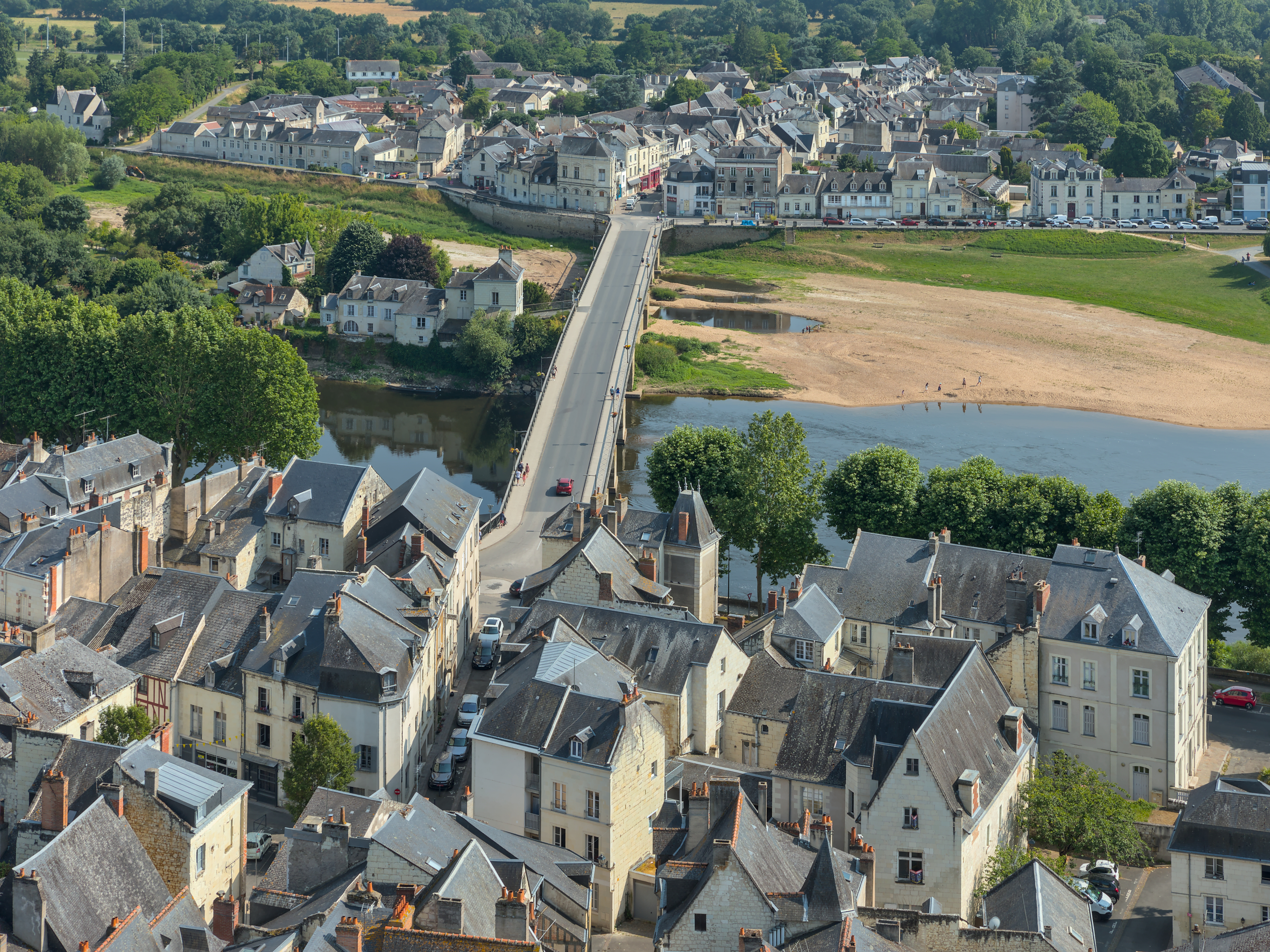
- View from the Château de Chinon: the Carroi neighborhood, the Eleanor of Aquitaine bridge and the Saint Jack neighborhood

- Coat of arms
- Location of Chinon
- Location within France Location within Centre-Val de Loire
- Coordinates: 47°10′04″N 0°14′37″E
- Country: France
- Region: Centre-Val de Loire
- Department: Indre-et-Loire
- Arrondissement: Chinon
- Canton: Chinon

Government
  - Mayor (2020–2026): Jean-Luc Dupont
- Area^{1}: 39.02 km^{2} (15.07 sq mi)
- Elevation: 37 m (121 ft)
- Highest elevation: 112 m (367 ft)
- Lowest elevation: 27 m (89 ft)
- Population (2023): 8,144
  - Density: 208.7/km^{2} (540.6/sq mi)
- Time zone: UTC+01:00 (CET)
  - Summer (DST): UTC+02:00 (CEST)
- INSEE/Postal code: 37072 /37500
- ^{1} French Land Register data, which excludes lakes, ponds, glaciers > 1 km^{2} (0.386 sq mi or 247 acres) and river estuaries.

Chinon (French pronunciation: [ʃinɔ̃]) is a commune in the Indre-et-Loire department, Centre-Val de Loire, France.

The traditional province around Chinon, Touraine, became a favorite resort of French kings and their nobles beginning in the late 15th and early 16th centuries. The Renaissance châteaux which they built new or erected on the foundations of old fortresses earned this part of the Loire Valley the nickname "The Garden of France." Chinon played an important and strategic role during the Middle Ages, serving both French and English kings.

Chinon is known for its wine, castle, and historic town. Its part of the Loire Valley has been registered as a UNESCO World Heritage Site since 2000.

== History ==
The historic town of Chinon is on the banks of the river Vienne about 10 kilometres (6 mi) from where it joins the Loire. Settlement in Chinon dates from prehistoric times, with a pronounced importance for both French and English history in the Middle Ages. At this period rivers were the main trade routes, and the Vienne joins both the fertile regions of the Poitou and the city of Limoges, and is a tributary of the Loire, which acted as a traffic thoroughfare. The site was fortified early on, and by the 5th century a Gallo-Roman castrum had been established there.

Towards the mid 5th century, a disciple of St Martin, St Mexme, established first a hermitage, and then a monastery to the east of the town. This religious foundation bearing his name flourished in the medieval period, being rebuilt and extended four times. The eventual complex contained a large and highly decorated church and a square of canons' residences. Closure and partial demolition during and after the Revolution of 1789 have damaged this once very important church. The imposing second façade still stands, with its nave dating from the year 1000 AD. Its important remains have been restored as historical monument and a cultural centre.

During the Middle Ages, Chinon further developed, especially under Henry II (Henry Plantagenêt, Count of Anjou, crowned King of England in 1154). The castle was rebuilt and extended, becoming his administrative center and a favourite residence. It was where court was frequently held during the Angevin Empire.

On Henry's death at the castle in 1189, Chinon passed to his eldest surviving son from his marriage with Eleanor of Aquitaine, Richard I the Lionheart. On Richard's death in 1199, it passed to the youngest of their children, John Lackland. King John would lose the castle in a siege in 1205 to the French king Philip II Augustus, from which date it was included in the French royal estates as the royal duchy of Touraine.

The castle in Chinon served as a prison for a time when Philip IV the Fair ordered the Knights Templar arrested in 1307. Jacques de Molay, Grand Master, and a few other dignitaries of the Order of the Temple were incarcerated there prior to trial and eventual execution.

Chinon again played a significant role in the struggle for the throne between the French and the English during the Hundred Years' War (1337–1453) when the heir apparent, the future Charles VII of France sought refuge and installed his court there in 1425. The province remained faithful to him and he made lengthy stays with his court there. In 1429, the 17-year-old Joan of Arc came to Chinon to meet and to acknowledge him as the rightful heir to the throne. After interrogation to prove she had been sent on a mission from God and with the men and arms then accorded to her, she would go on to break the siege of Orléans in June and open the way for Charles to be crowned at Reims in July 1429. The meetings in Chinon with the future Charles VII of France and his acceptance of her constituted the turning point of the war, helping to establish both firmer national boundaries and sentiment.

Chinon also served Louis XII as he waited for the papal legate Cesare Borgia to bring the annulment papers from Jeanne de France, enabling him to marry Anne of Brittany in 1498, and thus solidifying an even more coherent French territory.

In 1490, the commune of Chinon was the birthplace of the writer, humanist, humorist, philosopher and satirist François Rabelais, author of Gargantua and Pantagruel amongst other works. The region is the scene of these fantastic, critical and observant adventures.

From the 16th century, Chinon was no longer a royal residence, and in 1631 it became part of the estates of the Duke of Richelieu, who neglected the fortress. Apart from townhouses and convents that were built, the city changed little up to the Revolution. In the 1820s, however, the fortifications were pulled down and the banks of the river Vienne were opened up to the outside.

In the late 19th and 20th centuries, Chinon grew to the east, towards the railway station, and to the north on the hill. The historic centre was registered as a conservation area in 1968, and since that time has been undergoing restoration in order to preserve its historic, natural and architectural identity.

== Geography ==
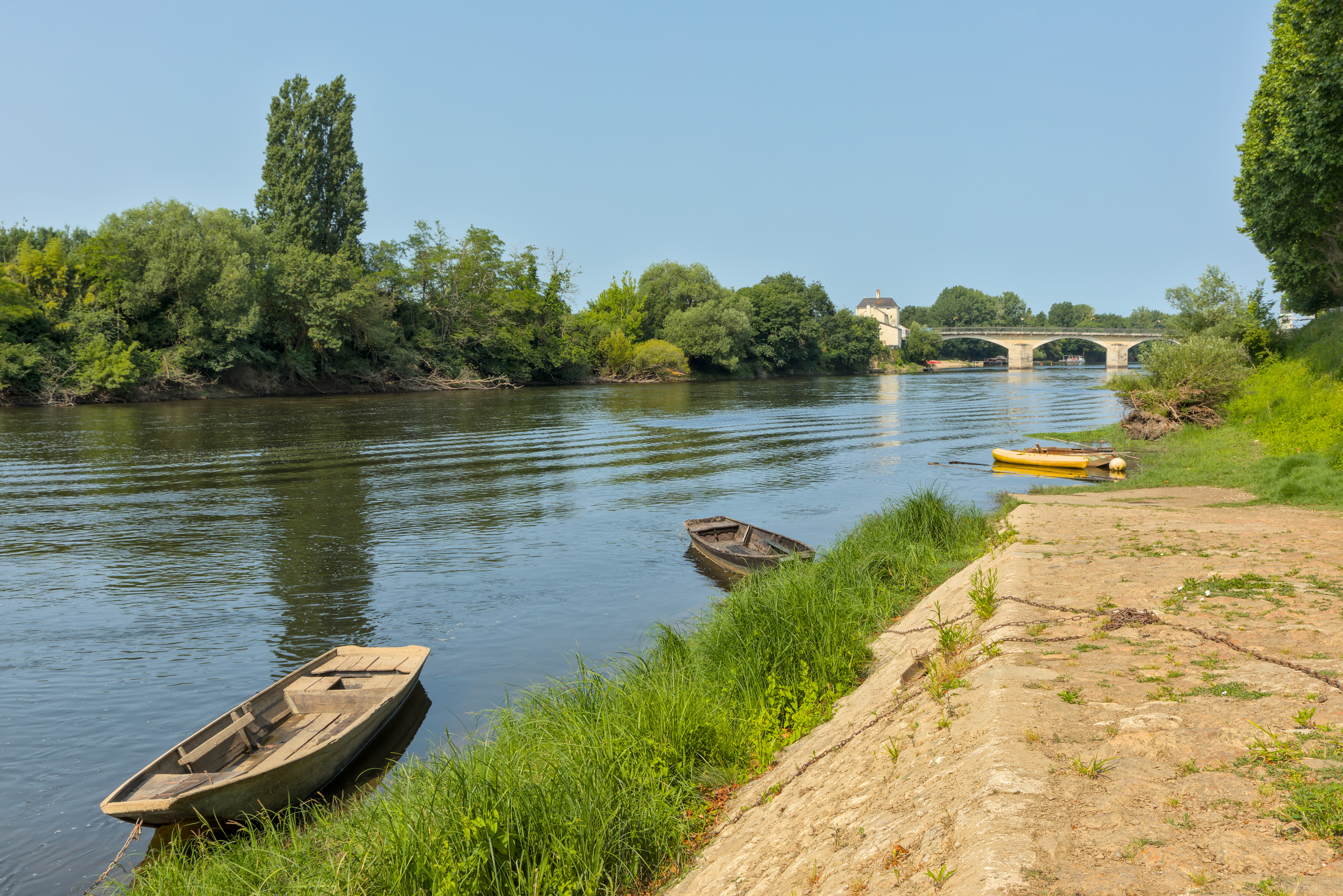
The Vienne river in Chinon.

Chinon is located in the heart of the Val de Loire, 47 km (29 miles) southwest of Tours and 305 km (189 miles) south west of Paris. It extends on both the banks of the Vienne, with the historic town mainly on the northern bank, at the foot of the medieval castle.

Chinon's importance derives in great part from its geographical position, located on the Vienne just before it joins the Loire. From prehistoric times, rivers acted as the principal trade routes, and the Vienne not only joins the fertile southern plains of the Poitou and the city of Limoges, but joining the Loire, gives access to both the seaport in Nantes and the Île-de-France Paris region, thus providing not only a natural protective barrier, but a source of wealth.

The natural rocky outcrop that dominates the northern bank provides not only a natural fort and defensive position; it also acts as protection from flooding.

== Population ==
Historical population

Year	Pop.	±% p.a.
1793	5,704	—
1800	6,110	+0.99%
1806	5,992	−0.32%
1821	6,333	+0.37%
1831	6,859	+0.80%
1836	6,911	+0.15%
1841	6,677	−0.69%
1846	6,690	+0.04%
1851	6,774	+0.25%
1856	6,922	+0.43%
1861	6,905	−0.05%
1866	6,895	−0.03%
1872	6,553	−0.84%
1876	6,301	−0.98%
1881	6,096	−0.66%
1886	6,205	+0.36%
1891	6,119	−0.28%
1896	6,187	+0.22%
1901	6,033	−0.50%

Year	Pop.	±% p.a.
1906	5,813	−0.74%
1911	5,943	+0.44%
1921	5,349	−1.05%
1926	5,751	+1.46%
1931	5,515	−0.83%
1936	5,790	+0.98%
1946	6,069	+0.47%
1954	6,743	+1.33%
1962	7,593	+1.50%
1968	7,735	+0.31%
1975	8,014	+0.51%
1982	8,622	+1.05%
1990	8,627	+0.01%
1999	8,716	+0.11%
2007	8,202	−0.76%
2012	7,928	−0.68%
2017	8,242	+0.78%
2023	8,144	−0.20%

Source: EHESS and INSEE (1968-2023)

== Wine ==
Carved into the banks of the Vienne River are the caves, or wine cellars, for Chinon's well-known Cabernet Franc-based red wines.

== Monuments ==
=== The historic town ===
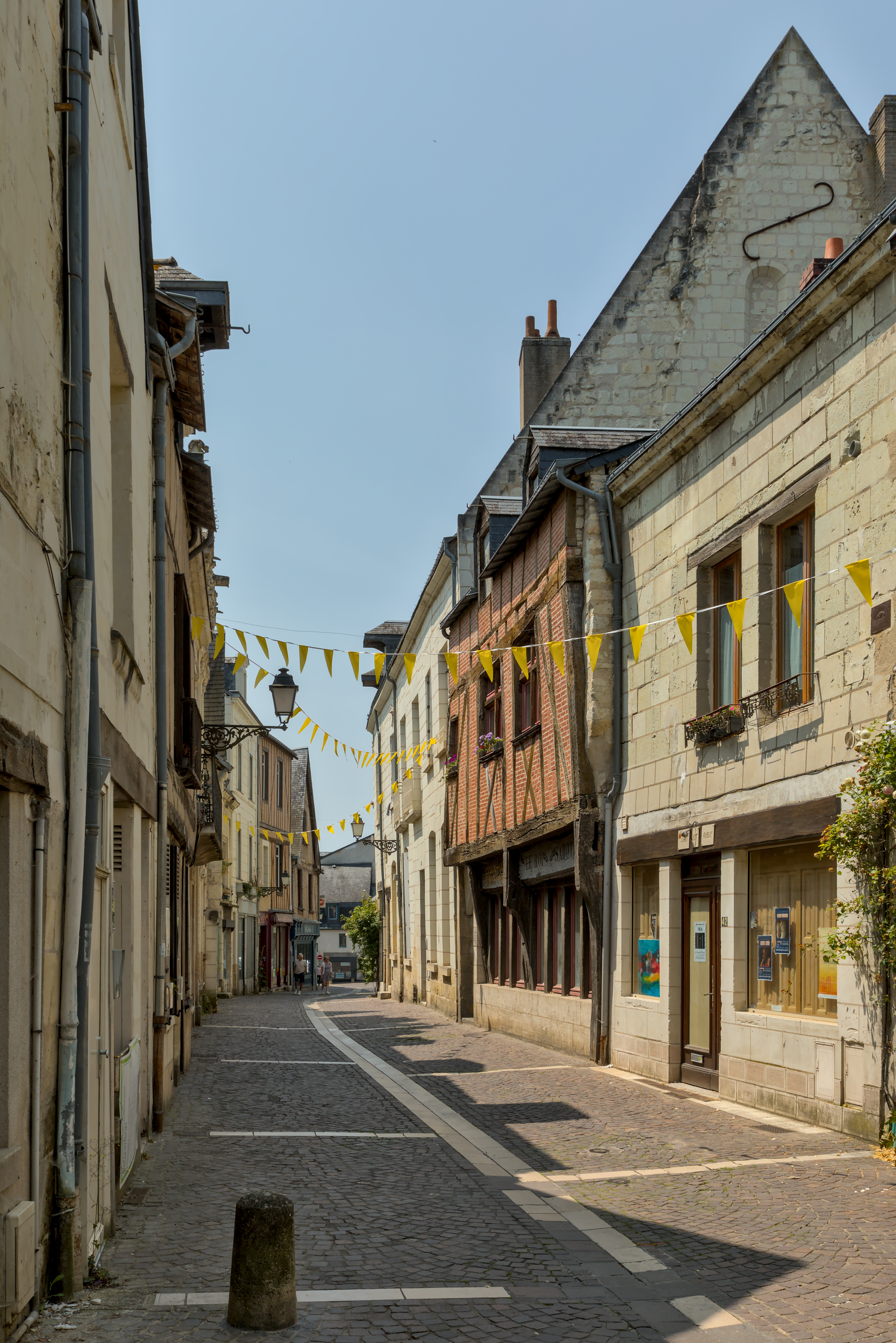
Rue Jean-Jacques Rousseau, one of the main streets in the historic town.

The historic town of Chinon presents an interesting architectural ensemble, from the Middle Ages and the beginning of the Renaissance when the Loire Valley was the seat of the king's court.

Topography has played a major role: the formerly fortified town was developed at the foot of the castle on the rocky outcrop, protecting the northern side, with the Vienne River in the south. Apart from the natural defensive protection on both sides, this fact makes a long narrow urban space, with the main streets running parallel to the river.

The town was developed on both sides of the river: the fortified town at the base of the castle; the canons' quarter to the east; and on the other bank a suburb on the way to the southern regions of the Poitou, important to the 12th century Plantagenets.

The former fortified town at the foot of the castle contains a significant collection of old houses and narrow streets, including some half timber houses dating from the end of the 14th or the 15th centuries. The majority of the houses line the main street of this quarter, the rue Voltaire that then becomes the rue Haute Saint Maurice, originally Gallo-Roman, and also presents a number of hôtels particuliers, or town manor houses, some with graceful turrets, winding staircase towers, and decorative elements form the end of the 15th or the beginning of the 16th century. Others, more sober and classical, date from the following periods, with some fine examples from the 17th and 18th centuries.

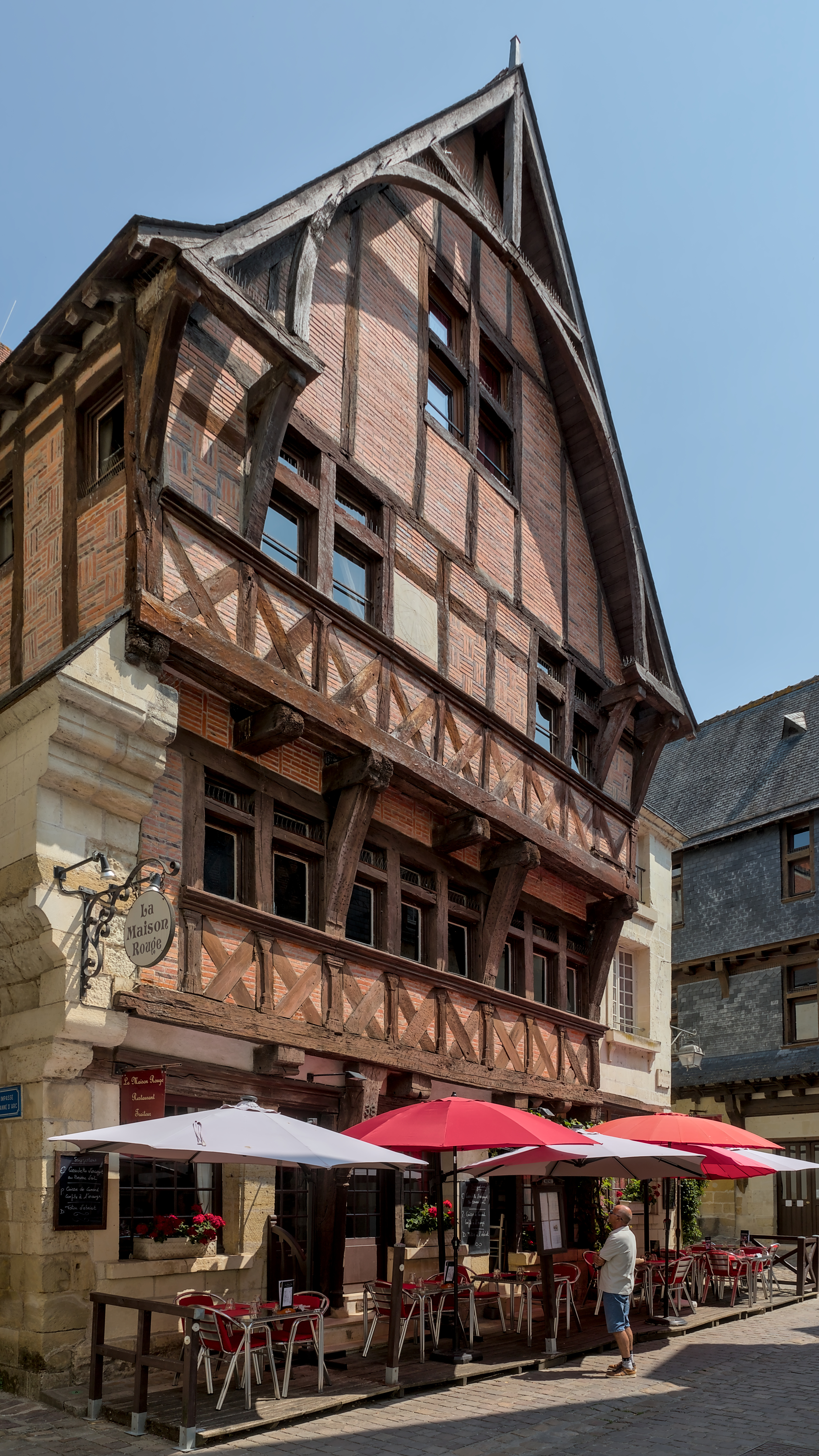
The Red House, at the very center of the medieval town.

This street continues on past the church of Saint Maurice to its end where it was formerly enclosed by the fortifications. It also, at the main crossroads of the "Grand Carroi", offered the only access to the castle from within the town, and is the street that Joan of Arc took to go up and meet the future Charles VII in 1429.

The stone houses are made of the local tufa stone, a soft luminous limestone, easy to carve and lending itself to the often ornate sculpted decorations of the late Gothic and early Renaissance period. The roofs are of slate, another particular regional architectural element.

The quarter to the east was enclosed as well. It too lost these elements in the 1820s in an effort to open the town up to circulation and commerce. In this quarter one finds the parish church of Saint Etienne, and further the canons' quarter of the collegiate church of Saint Mexme. Here the houses are often larger, some presenting courtyards and gardens, dating from the late 15th century and on, a few fine examples of which were the canons' residences. To the south one can join the promenade along the river, or go up the rocky slope north east to the Chapelle Sainte-Radegonde.

The quarters of the former fortified town and that of Saint Etienne-Saint Mexme are divided by what was the only open space during the Middle Ages which was developed in the 18th and 19th centuries, and the architectural elements date from this period. It now presents a square sheltered by trees with outdoor restaurants tables.

The town of Chinon also offers an unusual variety of perspectives, allowing one to take its measure in several ways: from the bank opposite the castle, or river by boat, from which one can fully see the architectural presence and importance of its castle and town; from the interior of the historic town itself; and from the rocky outcrop, either from the castle itself, or along the high narrow roads along it that lead past semi-troglodytic homes and caves to the chapel of Saint Radegonde, giving a panoramic view of the historic town and the valley that opens up on the other side of the river.

Chinon is also a participant in the Loire Valley cycling tourism circuit.

=== Collegiate church of Saint-Mexme ===
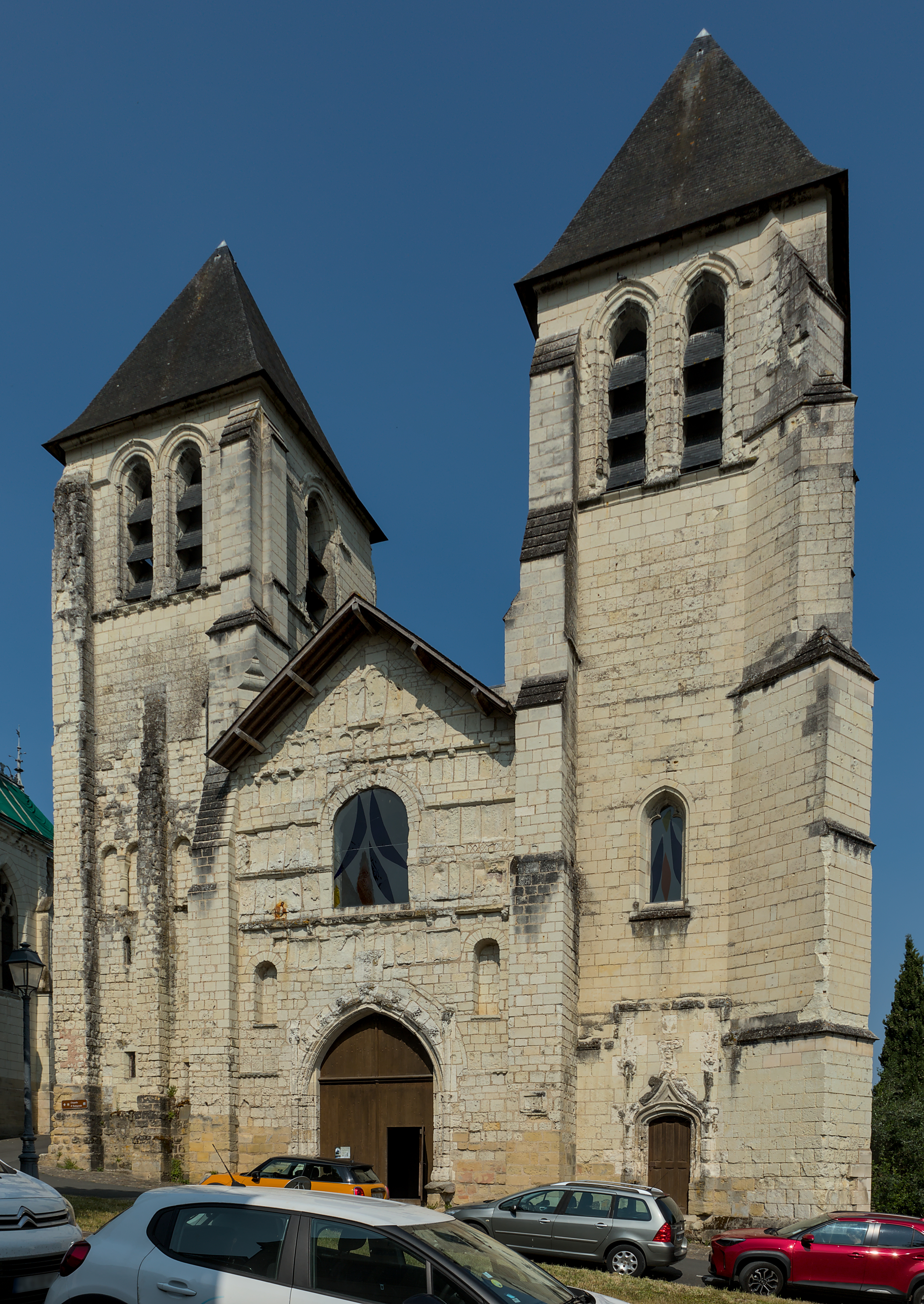
Collégiale Saint-Mexme church

Saint Mexme is the patron saint of Chinon, credited with having saved the town and its inhabitants in the 5th century from dying of thirst during a siege with a massive rain and thunder storm. This moment is depicted in one of the stained glass windows of the apse in the church of Saint Etienne in Chinon by the atelier Lobin in the 19th century.

The hermitage, then monastery founded by Saint Mexme was destroyed in the 10th century, thus requiring reconstruction around the year 1000 AD. It is at this date that it became a collegiate church. Its importance was confirmed not only by its architecture, but that it was subject directly to the Holy See in Rome.

The collegiate church of Saint Mexme was the main religious edifice of the town until the Revolution when it was deconsecrated. A lack of necessary upkeep would lead to its partial collapse in 1817. The remaining largely Romanesque church retains its first façade, now found in the interior, and its nave, both from the year 1000 AD. The nave is characterized by its horizontal lines: rows of large arcades and a series of high windows topped by a string course and a timber ceiling. Remains of richly painted decoration from the period subsist around the upper windows and in the northern arcade. It is now a Historical Monument, and since 2002 it has housed a small wooden frame theatre used for musical and theatrical events.

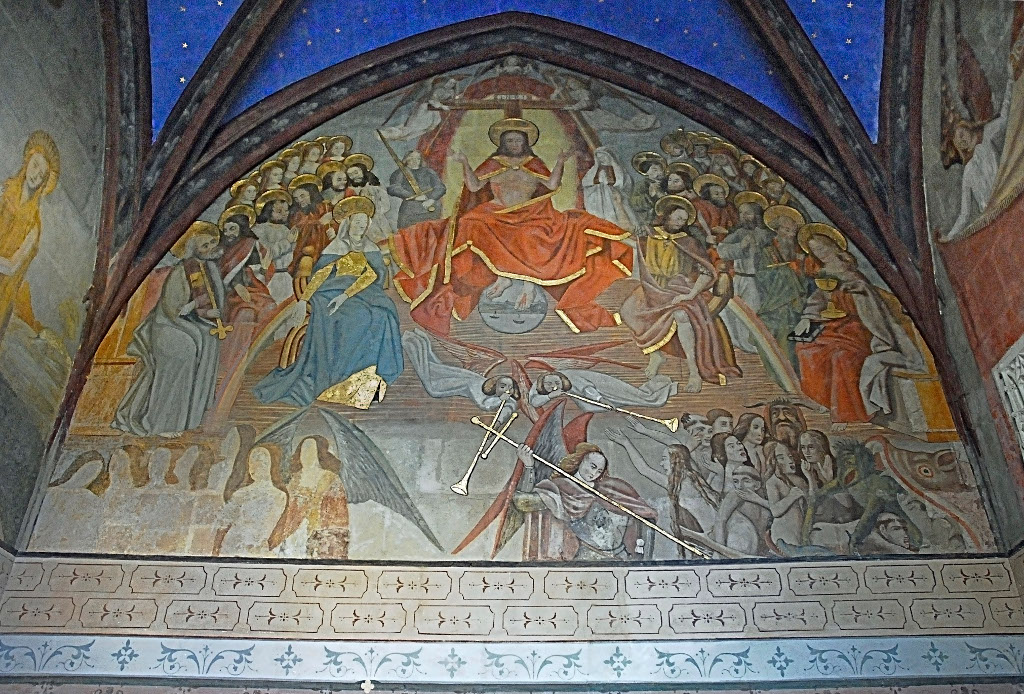
Fresco in Collégiale Saint-Mexme church

The imposing façade, or west front, actually the second one built, dates from 1050 AD. It has a central portion, once richly decorated with carved stones depicting figuratives scenes that were largely mutilated during the Revolution, flanked by two side towers partially rebuilt in the 15th century. Some decorative interlacing and plant motifs can still be seen. This second façade was most likely architecturally influential in the region at the time. It forms, with the first façade from the year 1000 AD conserved in the interior, a narthex with a large barrel-vault with semicircular arches; the walls present blind arcades. Visible in the south chapel are some 15th-century paintings that have been conserved, notably a Last Judgement, and a rare Fountain of Pity. A very fine 18th-century open-newel winding stone staircase leads from the narthex to the upper floor. The upper gallery contains mural paintings from the 13th century, and a rare and imposing crucifixion carved in stone near the top of the first façade also dating from the 1st millennium. In 2006, the window openings were embellished with stained glass, following the designs of the painter Olivier Debré. They provide an unbroken view of the surrounding landscape.

Around the collegiate church are several former canonical residences, dating from the Ancien Régime.

=== Chapelle Sainte-Radegonde ===
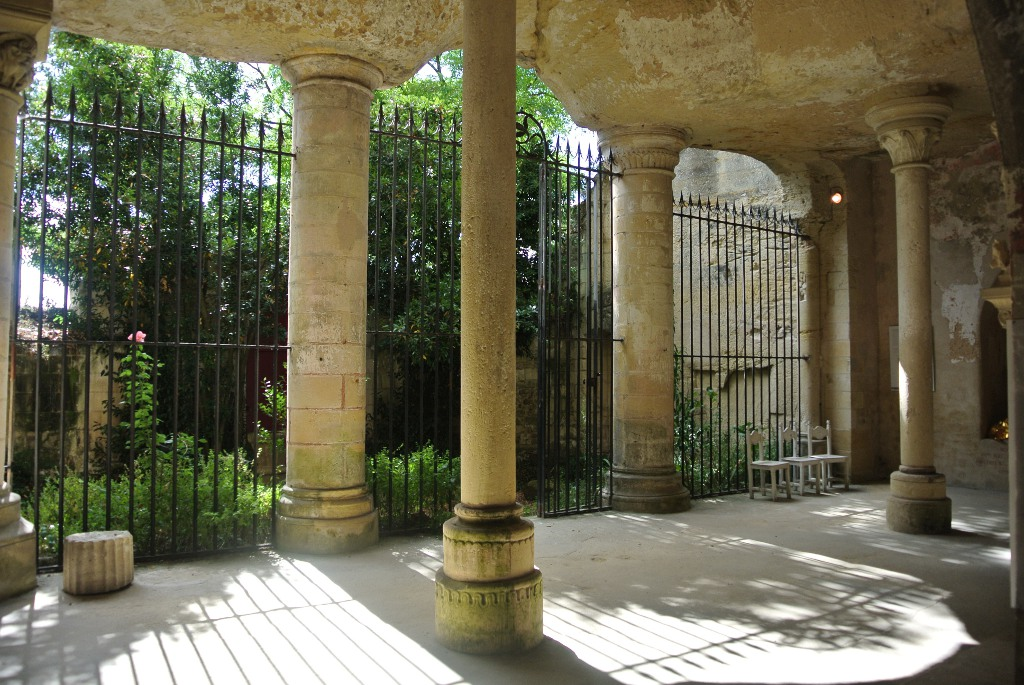
Chapelle Sainte-Radegonde

The Chapelle Sainte-Radegonde is half built into the rock face on the eastern outer limits of the town. During Antiquity, a natural underground spring at the back of the actual chapel was a site used for pagan worship. The site was Christianized in the 6th century when Queen Radegonde, later named a Saint, supposedly came to visit the hermit John who lived there. The name of the sanctuary comes from this event.

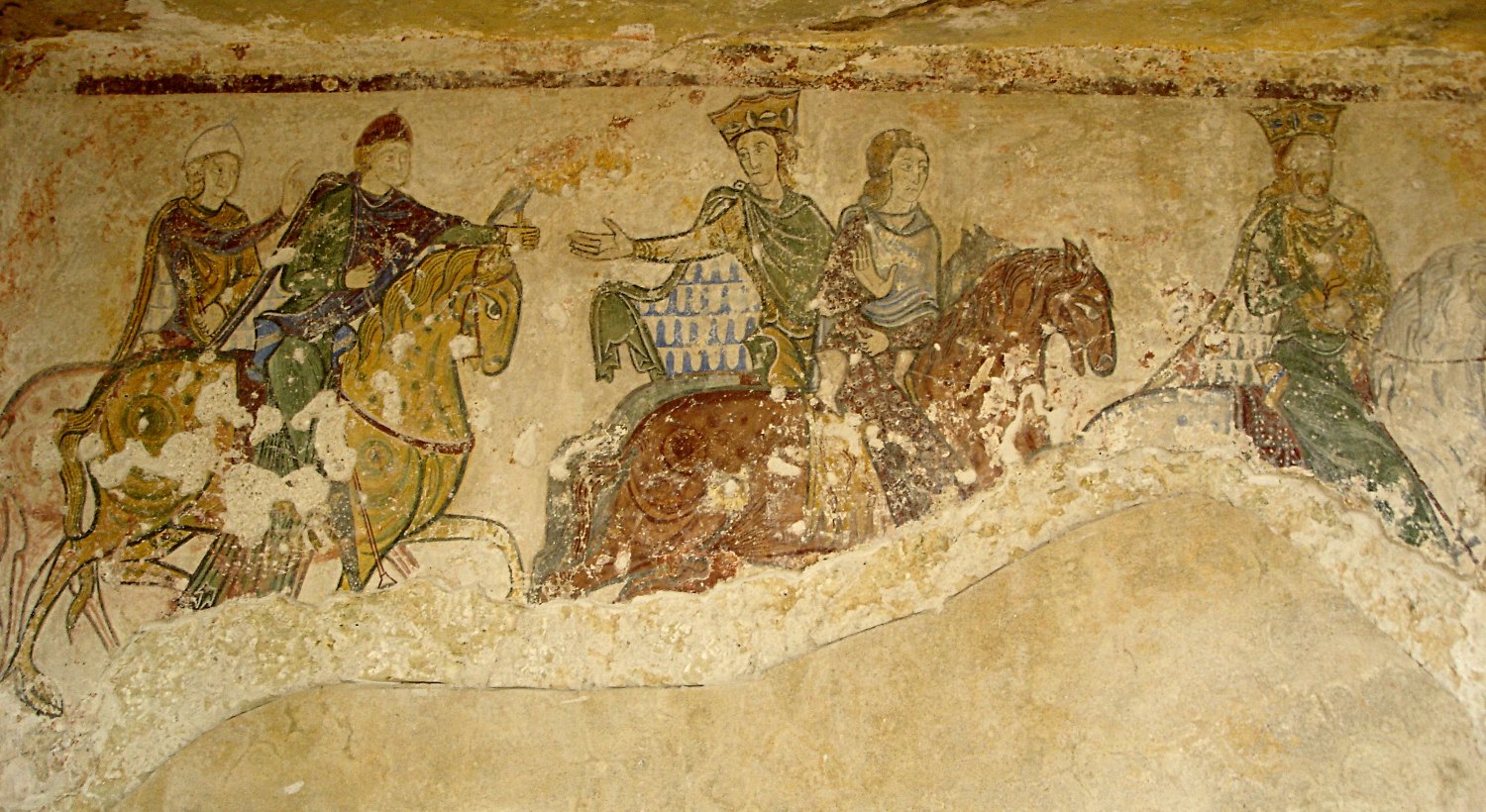
Fresco in Sainte-Radegonde chapel

Two naves were created, starting in the 12th century. One is carved directly into the rock and the second made adjacent to it at a later date. The chapel conserves some mural paintings, notably the Royal Hunt, made towards the end of the 12th century, the time of the power and residence of the Plantagenet family in Chinon. The fresco figures 5 riders, two of whom are crowned, and another with a bird of prey on his wrist. It has been presumed that it depicts members of the Plantagenet family in Chinon, the two crowned figures possibly being Henry II and Eleanor of Aquitaine, or their son Henry the Younger, crowned during his father's lifetime in 1170. In addition to its subject matter, this painting is of outstanding quality in its execution, its vivacity and the variety of colours.

Other paintings, depicting the story of Saint Radegonde and Saint John, were made during the 17th century.

The chapel was deconsecrated following the Revolution and used as dwelling places. In 1878, it was bought and restored as a sanctuary by a benefactress of Chinon, Madame Charre.

=== Church of Saint Maurice ===
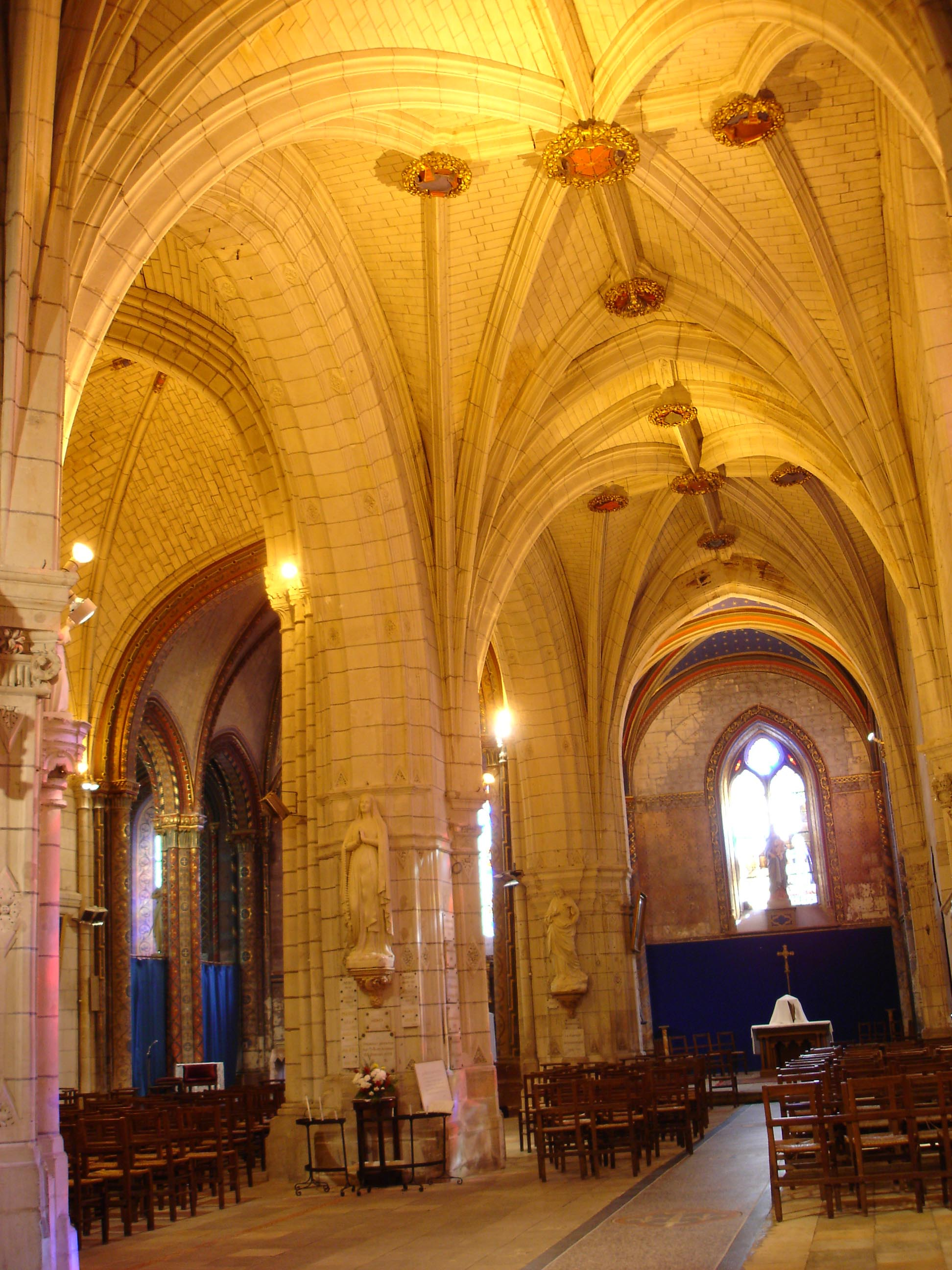
Saint-Maurice - Chapelles church, 15th / 16th century

The church of Saint Maurice is the parish church of the town, going thru several architectural evolutions. The oldest portion, the bell tower, is Romanesque, dating from the beginning of the 12th century. The nave and the choir both date from the end of the 12th century or beginning of the 13th, with Angevin Gothic style vaults. This style can be found in the Angevin territories, but not restricted to them. The vault is fairly bulbous in form, marked by very ornate sculptured and painted vault bosses, at the junction of the ribs and the capitols at the rib springs. A chapel from the 15th and a side aisle from the early 16th century mark the transition from Flamboyant Gothic to Renaissance architecture. The church was repainted in the 19th century, inspired by the restoration of the Sainte-Chapelle in Paris, and received new stained glass windows commissioned from the Atelier Lobin in Tours.

The church of Saint Maurice is the most likely location of Joan of Arc's prayer, while in Chinon in 1429.

=== Church of Saint Étienne ===
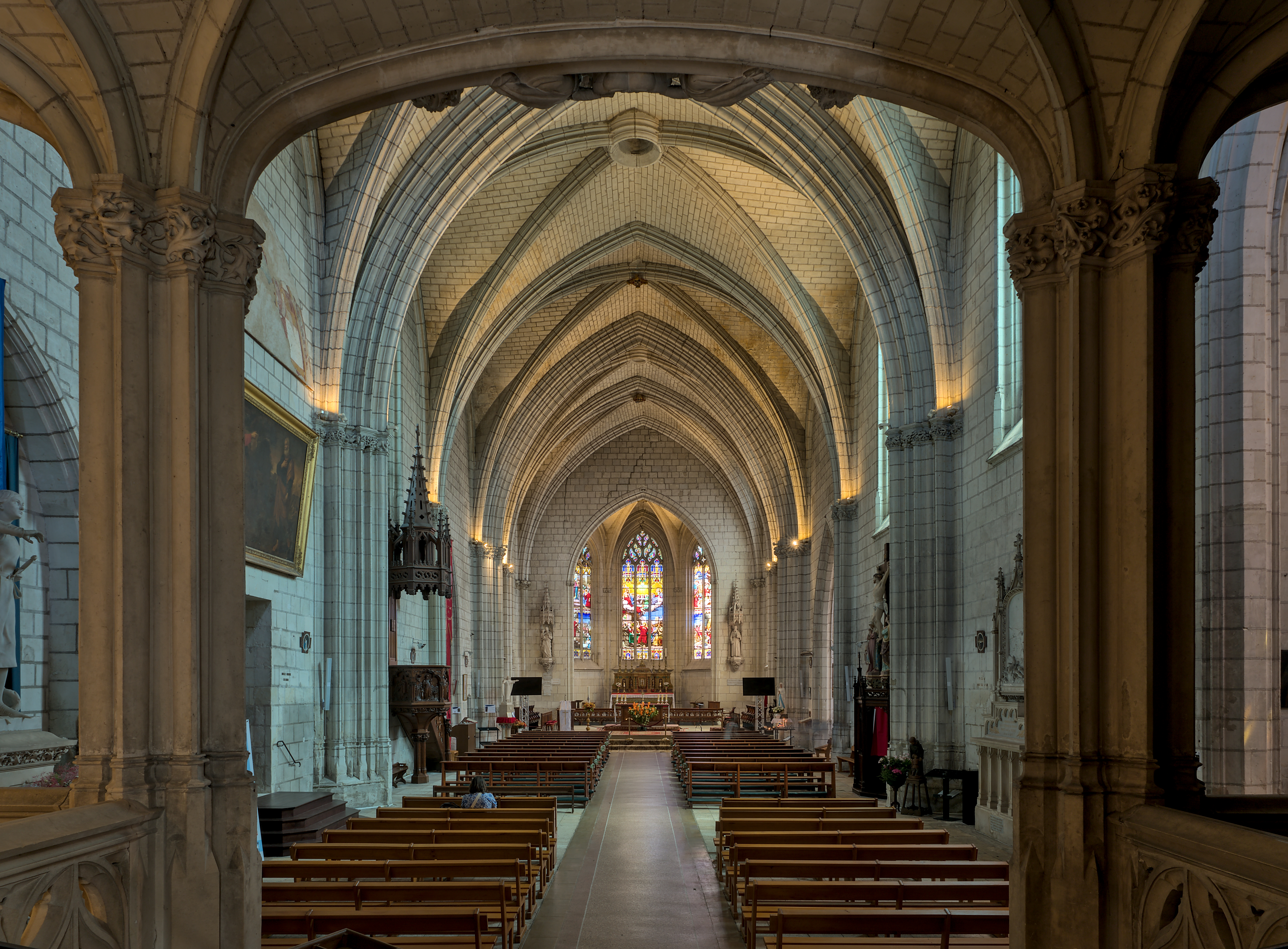
Inside Saint-Étienne church

The church of Saint Etienne, or Saint Stephen in English, is the parish church of the eastern quarter, not far from the collegiate church of Saint Mexme. It was completely reconstructed in the Flamboyant Gothic style, with the exception of the lower portion of the bell tower, in the 15th century. It has a large single aisle covered by ribbed vaults. The apse contains stained glass windows depicting scenes of religious importance in Chinon and the surrounding regions: the meeting of Queen and future Saint Radegonde and Saint John of Chinon in the 6th century; the miracle of Saint Mexme saving Chinon from a siege with a rain and thunder storm in the 5th century; the death of Martin of Tours in Candes-Saint-Martin in 397; and the meeting of Joan of Arc and the future Charles VII in 1429. They were produced on commission by the Atelier Lobin in Tours in the 19th century. It also houses the first statue of Joan of Arc in a church, placed there in 1900, two decades before her canonization.

== Notable people ==
- Radegonde of Valois (c. 1425–1445), a French princess, eldest daughter of King Charles VII of France and Marie of Anjou. She was betrothed to Sigismund, Archduke of Austria.
- François Rabelais (ca.1493–1553), was a major French Renaissance writer, doctor, Renaissance humanist, monk and Greek scholar.
- René Ouvrard (1624–1694), a French priest, writer and composer.
- Jules Pierre Rambur (1801–1870), a French entomologist.
- Jean-Philippe Grand (born 1953), racing driver
- André Girard (1901-1968), famous painter and founder of CARTE Network
- Pierre Leveel (1914-2017), local historian

== See also ==
- Loire Valley (wine)
- The Chinon Parchment is a historical document, published by Étienne Baluze in Vitae Paparum Avenionensis ("Lives of the Popes of Avignon"), Paris, 1693.
- List of castles in France
- Samson of Chinon
- Chapelle Sainte Radegonde (Chinon)
