= Jean-Jacques Bourassé =

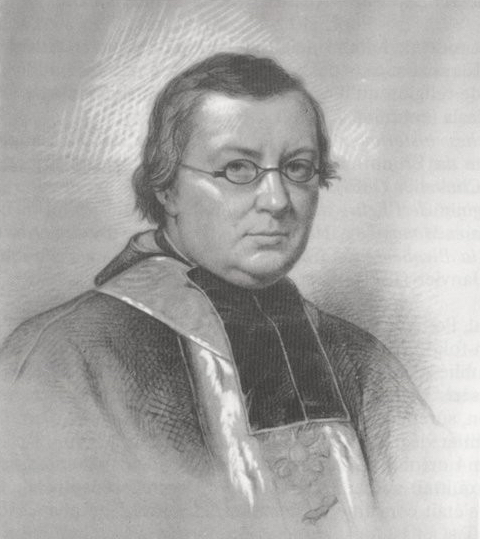
Jean-Jacques Bourassé (etching)

Jean-Jacques Bourassé (22 December 1813, Ste.-Maure (Indre-et-Loire), France—4 October 1872, Tours) was a French Roman Catholic priest, archaeologist and historian. He made his preparatory studies for the priesthood in Paris. In 1835, he taught the natural sciences at the preparatory seminary of Tours, where he began a course of archaeology that soon attracted attention. The results achieved by him in a comparatively new field of research were such as to entitle him to be considered a veritable pioneer in France of the science of Christian archaeology. In 1884 he became professor at the grand séminaire and held the chair of dogmatic theology there for six years. He then discontinued teaching in order to devote himself entirely to the preparation of his various archæological works. Among the productions published by him the best known are: Archéologie Chrétienne (1841); Les Cathédrales de France (1843); Les plus belles églises du monde (1857); Recherches historiques et archéologiques sur les églises romaines en Touraine (1869).

Together with Pierre-Désiré Janvier in 1843 he published a French translation of the Bible from the Vulgate. It was published as a luxurious edition in two volumes, illustrated by H. Giacomelli and G. Doré. It was a readable translation that could have become more popular except for the high cost.

== Bibliography ==
- Buchberger, Michael, Kirchliches-Handlexikon, I, 116
- Vigouroux, Fulcran, in Dictionnaire de la Bible, I, 1894
- Chevalier, "L'abbé Bourassé" in Bulletin de la Société archéologique de Touraine (1873), II 377-423
- This article incorporates text from the 1907 Catholic Encyclopedia article "Jean-Jacques Bourassé" by Martin Augustine Waldron, a publication now in the public domain.
