= Charles de Grandmaison =

French archivist and historian

Charles de Grandmaison (May 29, 1824 – June 19, 1903) was a French archivist and historian.

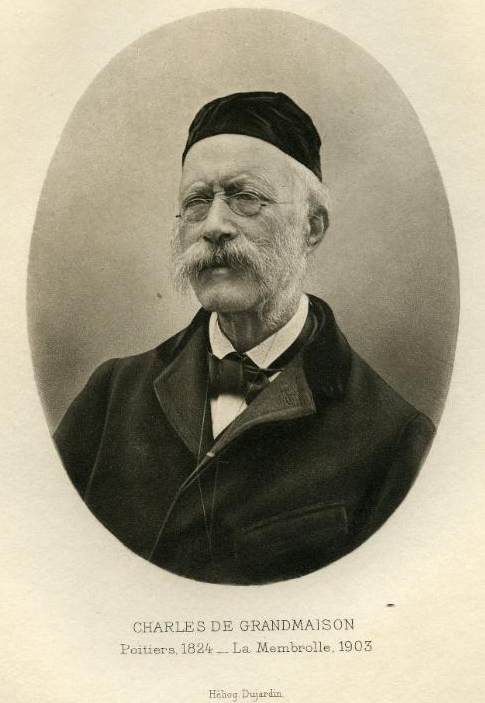
Charles de Grandmaison, was a French archivist and historian.

== Biography ==
Pierre-Charles-Armand de Loizeau de Grandmaison was born in Poitiers.

In 1853 he was hired as an archivist in Archives départementales d'Indre-et-Loire. In June of the same year, he met Alexis de Tocqueville, whom he helped greatly in gathering the necessary materials for writing L'Ancien Régime et la Révolution. Tocqueville mentioned Grandmaison gratefully in the preface of this work.

He died in La Membrolle-sur-Choisille.

== Honors ==

- Chevalier de la Légion d'honneur in 1870
- Officier d'Académie in 1868
- Officier de l’Instruction publique in 1874

== Works ==
- Dictionnaire héraldique, contenant l’explication et la description des termes et figures usités dans le blason, des notices sur les ordres de chevalerie, les marques des charges et dignités, les ornements et l’origine des armoiries, les rois d’armes et les tournois, etc., suivi d’un Abrégé chronologique d’édits, déclarations, règlements, arrêts et lettres patentes des rois de France de la troisième race concernant le fait de la noblesse par Chérin, Jean-Pierre Migne imprimeur, Petit Montrouge 1852.
- Chartularium Sancti Jovini, Société de statistique du département des Deux-Sèvres, t. XIV., imprimerie L. Favre & Cie, Niort 1854.
- Essai sur le servage en Touraine, in Le Livre des serfs de Marmoutier, publié par feu André Salmon, Mémoires de la Société archéologique de Touraine, t. XVI, imprimerie de Ladevèze, Tours 1864.
- Notice sur l’abolition du servage en Touraine, d’après le « liber de Servis » de Marmoutier et les pièces qui l’accompagnent, Imprimerie impériale, Paris 1865.
- Notes et Documents inédits sur les peintres de l’école de Tours, au XIVe et au XVe siècle, Imprimerie impériale, Paris 1868.
- Documents inédits pour servir à l’histoire des arts en Touraine, Mémoires de la Société archéologique de Touraine, t. XX., Guilland-Verger et Georget-Joubert, Tours 1870.
- Guide du voyageur sur les chemins de fer de la Vendée […] orné de gravures et d’une carte, Mazereau, Tours 1875.
- Chronique de l’abbaye de Beaumont-lez-Tours, publiée pour la première fois, d’après un manuscrit des archives d’Indre-et-Loire, imprimerie de Rouillé-Ladevèze, Tours 1877.
- Tours archéologique, histoire et monuments, tiré à part du Bulletin monumental, t. XXXIX], H. Champion, Paris 1879.
- Fragments de chartes du Xe siècle provenant de Saint-Julien de Tours, recueillis sur les registres d’état-civil d’Indre-et-Loire, librairie Picard, Paris 1886.
- Inventaire-sommaire des archives départementales antérieures à 1790, t. I, imprimerie E. Arrault et Cie, Tours 1891.
- Archives civiles, séries A à E, t. II, P. Dupont, Paris 1878.
- Archives ecclésiastiques, série G, t. III, imprimerie E. Arrault et Cie, Tours 1884.
- Alexis de Tocqueville en Touraine, préparation du livre sur l’Ancien Régime, juin 1853-avril 1854, Librairie nouvelle, Paris 1893.
