= Trolleybuses in Saint-Étienne =

Saint-Étienne trolleybus system
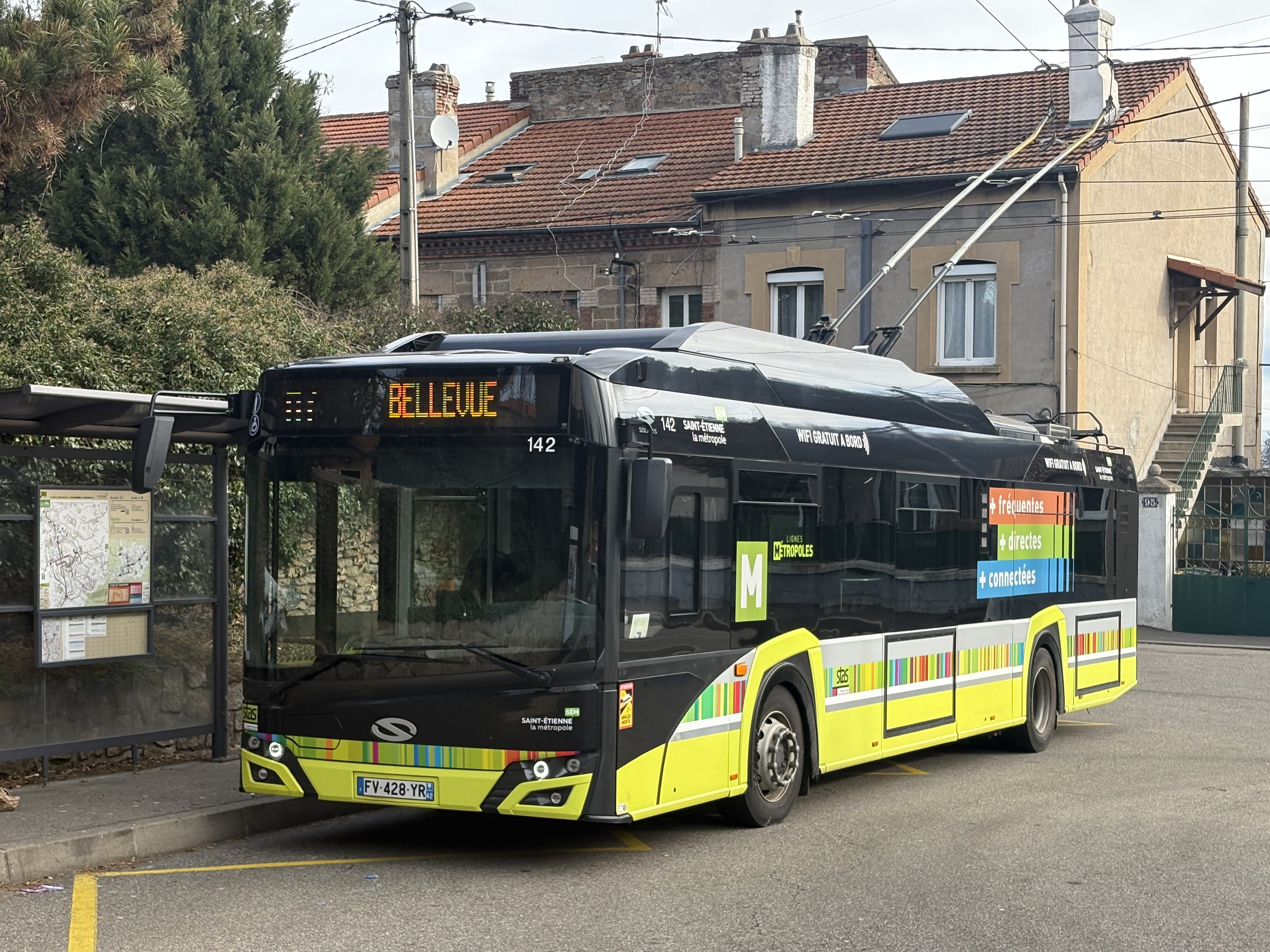
- A Solaris Trollino on route M7 in 2026

Operation
- Locale: Saint-Étienne, Rhône-Alpes, France
- Open: 1 January 1942
- Status: Open
- Routes: 2
- Operator: Société de Transports de l'Agglomération Stéphanoise (STAS)

Statistics
- Website: https://www.reseau-stas.fr/ STAS (in French)

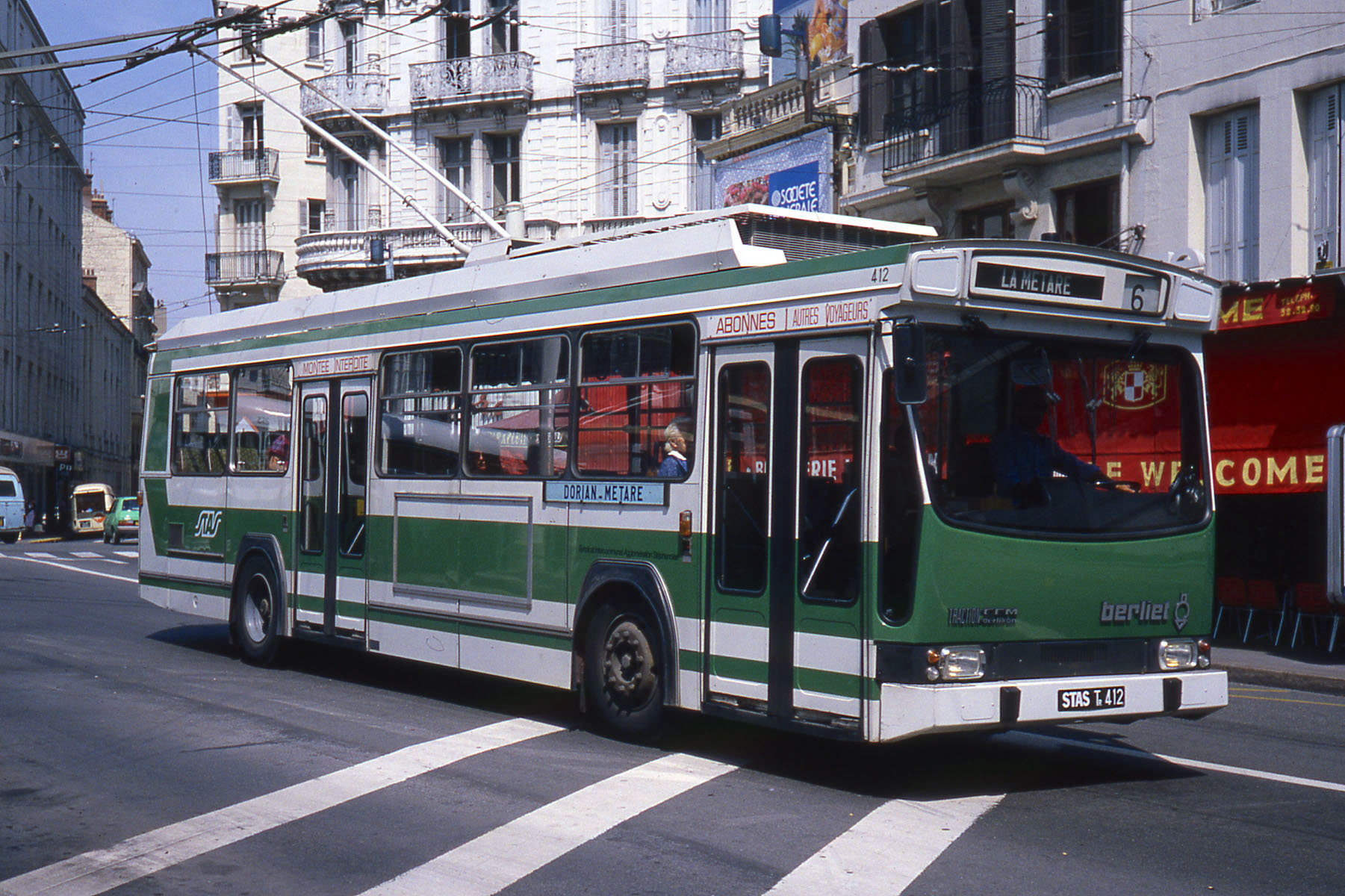
A Berliet ER100 trolleybus in St-Étienne in 1981.

The Saint-Étienne trolleybus system (French: Réseau de trolleybus de Saint-Étienne) forms part of the public transport network of the city and commune of Saint-Étienne, in the Rhône-Alpes region of the Great South East of France.

In operation since 1942, the system is one of four operating trolleybus systems in France; the others are in Limoges, Lyon and Nancy. Today, the city is taking major steps to develop trolleybus transport. New battery trolleybuses Solaris T12 with ŠKODA electric equipment were purchased. In addition, the number of vehicles was increased compared to the original fleet so that electric traffic could be resumed on the M7 Michon - city center - Bellevue line. In the near future, trolleybuses will also return to the M6 line serving the Metare housing estate, where a trolley line is now being built again. In addition, the line will use the planned BRT corridor and the carrier will purchase articulated trolleybuses for it. These should also appear on the M4 line.

== Services ==
The current Saint-Étienne trolleybus line is:

- M3 : Cotonne – Hôtel de Ville – Terrenoire
- M7 : Michon – Hôtel de Ville – Bellevue

== Trolleybus fleet ==
As of 2022, the Saint-Étienne trolleybus fleet consisted of the following types:

- Solaris T12 (23 trolleybuses, nos. 131–153), entered service in 2019–2021

As of 2011, the Saint-Étienne trolleybus fleet consisted of the following types:

- Berliet ER100 (5 trolleybuses, nos. 427, 430, 433, 436, 438), entered service in 1981 (in storage).
- Irisbus Cristalis ETB12 (11 trolleybuses, nos. 111–121), entered service in 2003.

== See also ==
- Gare de Saint-Étienne-Châteaucreux
- List of trolleybus systems in France
- Saint-Étienne tramway
