= Vétra =

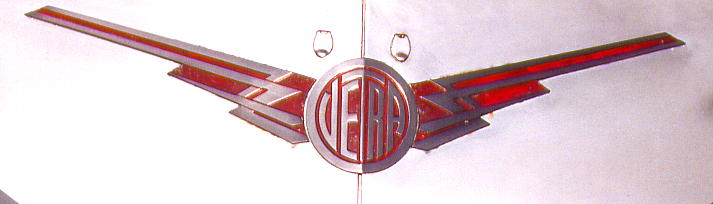

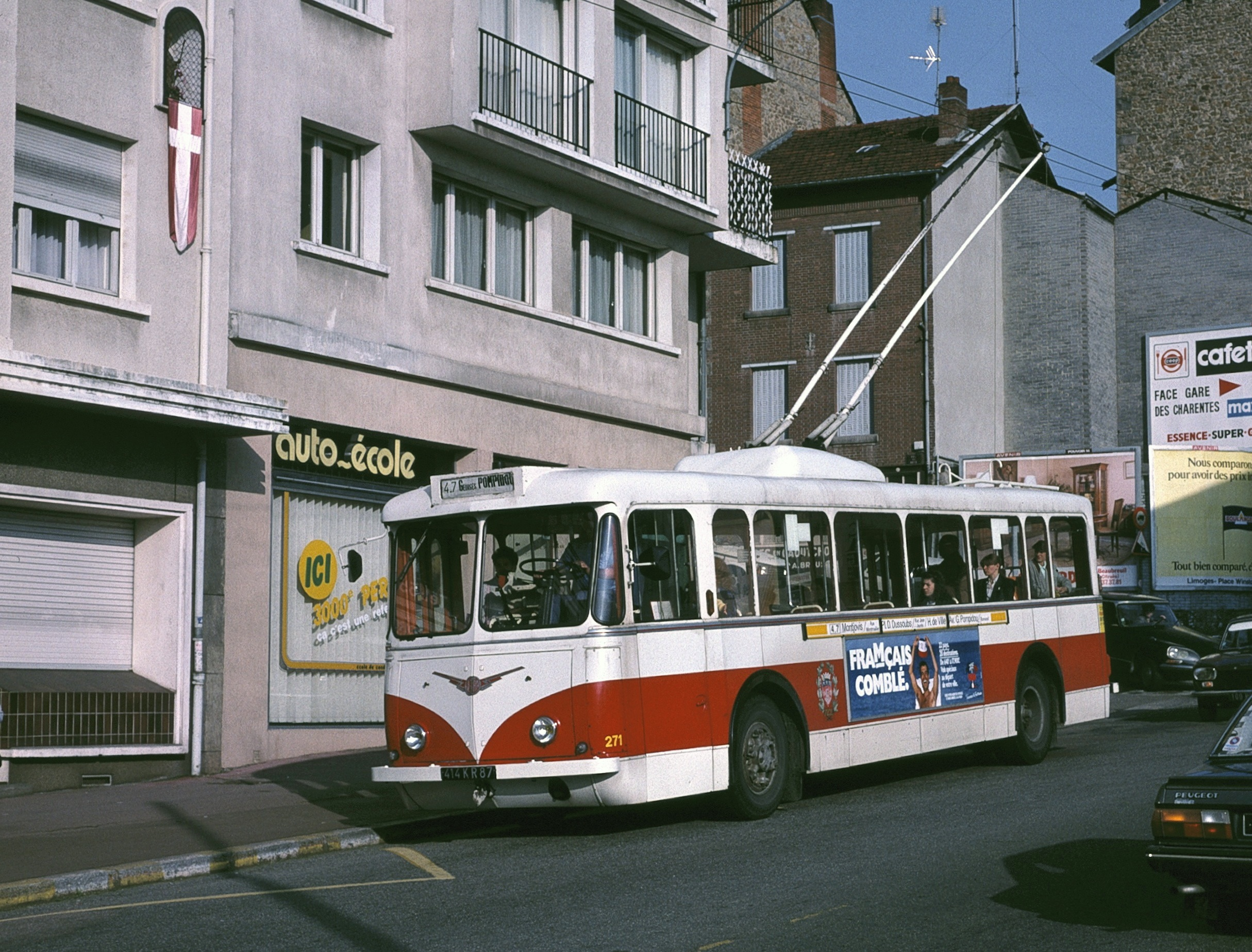
- Limoges was one of the last places where Vétra trolleybuses operated. This 1950-built example was photographed in 1988.
- Type: Private
- Industry: Transportation
- Founded: 1925
- Defunct: 1964
- Fate: Bankrupt
- Headquarters: Paris, France
- Area served: Worldwide
- Products: Trolleybuses, electric locomotives

Vétra (or Vetra), or more formally the Société des Véhicules et Tracteurs Electriques, was a French manufacturer of trolleybuses and electric locomotives. Founded in 1925, it became one of Western Europe's largest builders of trolleybuses during the middle decades of the 20th century, making in excess of 1,750 vehicles, for cities in France and in several other countries. The company ceased production in 1964.

== History ==
Vétra was founded in 1925 and was based in Paris. After initially experimenting with production of accumulator railcars, the company made its first trolleybus in 1927. The first Vétra trolleybuses were two vehicles, model MV, supplied to the Aubagne–Cuges trolleybus system, which was located just east of Marseille and began operation on 22 September 1927. In the decades that followed, Vétra had a near-monopoly on French trolleybus production. Trolleybus systems operating in France also bought their fleets nearly exclusively from Vétra. From the 1930s through the 1950s, the "overwhelming majority" of trolleybuses in use on French systems were built by Vétra. On a smaller scale, the company also sold trolleybuses to systems located in other countries.

The traction motors and other electrical equipment in Vétra trolleybuses were supplied by Alsthom (now called Alstom) in all or nearly all cases, while many mechanical parts, often including chassis, came from Berliet. The vehicle bodies were fabricated by various different companies, Berliet included. In its 38 years of trolleybus production, the company made no less than 31 different models. Some were only small variations on another model. For example, the VBRh was basically the same as the VBR except was 2.9 m tall instead of 2.7 m, and the h suffix in the model number stood for "haute" (high).

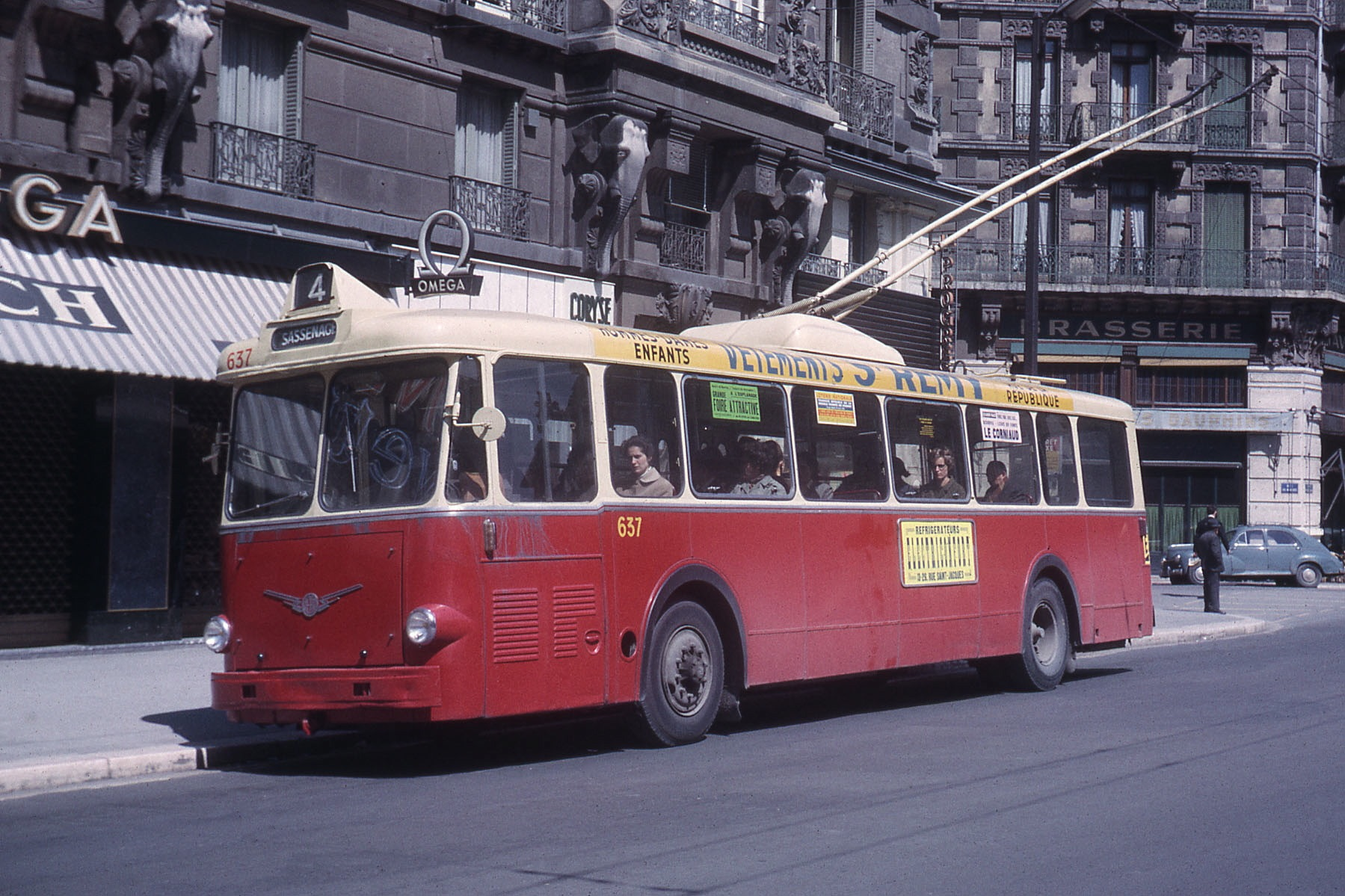
A 1957 Vétra VBF-model trolleybus in Grenoble in 1965. This vehicle originally served the Paris trolleybus system.

Models produced included both two-axle and three-axle rigid vehicles, with large numbers of each. In its history, Vétra only built one articulated trolleybus. This was a prototype for Algiers, Algeria. Built in 1950/51, it was designated model VA4.SR and had four axles, three in the front section and one in the trailing section. It was tested on the Paris trolleybus system in January 1951. This prototype was unsuccessful, and it was eventually rebuilt into a three-axle rigid vehicle.

Vétra also made some freight vehicles for a non-passenger trolleytruck line between Villey-Saint-Étienne and Varangéville, France. It also built small electric locomotives for use on mine railways.

In 1961 Pegaso, the Spanish truck and bus maker, reached an agreement with Vetra to launch to the Spanish market a Pegaso trolleybus, called model 8010, based on Vetra technology. The operation, however, was a failure, due to the contemporary import to Spain of several tenths of ex-London Transport BUT units; and only one Pegaso 8010, with a Seida body, was ever built.

By the early 1960s, several French trolleybus systems had closed, and most of those that remained were destined to close within a few years, so were not purchasing new trolleybuses. Facing a steep decline in orders, Vétra filed for bankruptcy. Production ended in 1964, with the completion of an order for two VBH85 trolleybuses for Fribourg, Switzerland.

== Customers ==
Vétra sold trolleybuses to transit systems in 12 different countries, on three continents, including as far away as Chile. However, the majority were sold to systems in France. The overall total was in excess of 1,750, a quantity that has been matched or exceeded by only very few other trolleybus manufacturers.

=== Europe ===
External image
- Seida-bodied three-axle Vétra trolleybus for the city of Madrid

The Lyon trolleybus system purchased by far the largest number of Vétra trolleybuses of any system, a total of 372, comprising seven different models. Other large buyers in France were Marseille (145, of seven different models), Paris (133), St. Etienne (78), and Limoges (43). After the closure of the Paris system, in 1966, its 38 VBF trolleybuses were sold to the Grenoble system, and 40 of its VBRh trolleybuses were sold to Limoges; 24 of the latter entered service there, and some remained in service until 1989.

Other European countries where Vétra found buyers were Austria, Czechoslovakia, Poland, Spain and Switzerland. Most were small orders, but in Spain, 45 Vétras were purchased by Madrid and a total of 55 by Bilbao, in multiple orders.

=== Outside Europe ===
Vétra also found a good market in North Africa, where it sold to all but one of the eight trolleybus systems in operation, including Algiers, Constantine (3 separate operators) and Oran, in Algeria; Cairo, Egypt; Casablanca, Morocco; and Tunis, Tunisia. The sole exception was the system in Tétouan, Morocco, which bought all of its trolleybuses from Saurer. The trolleybuses sold to some of these systems in the 1930s were designed by Vétra but built by various other companies.

The company sold trolleybuses to a total of only two systems outside Europe and North Africa. Santiago, Chile, purchased 100 in 1952–53, and Niterói, Brazil, opened its trolleybus system with 45 Vétras in 1953. The Niteroi vehicles were model VBRh, which was Vétra's most widely sold model in the post-war era, bought by many cities. By contrast, the Santiago vehicles were a unique model, VA2, and were approximately the same size as, and bore a strong resemblance to, trolleybuses that the Santiago system had purchased from the U.S. company Pullman-Standard in 1946–48 and 1952.

== Last active examples ==
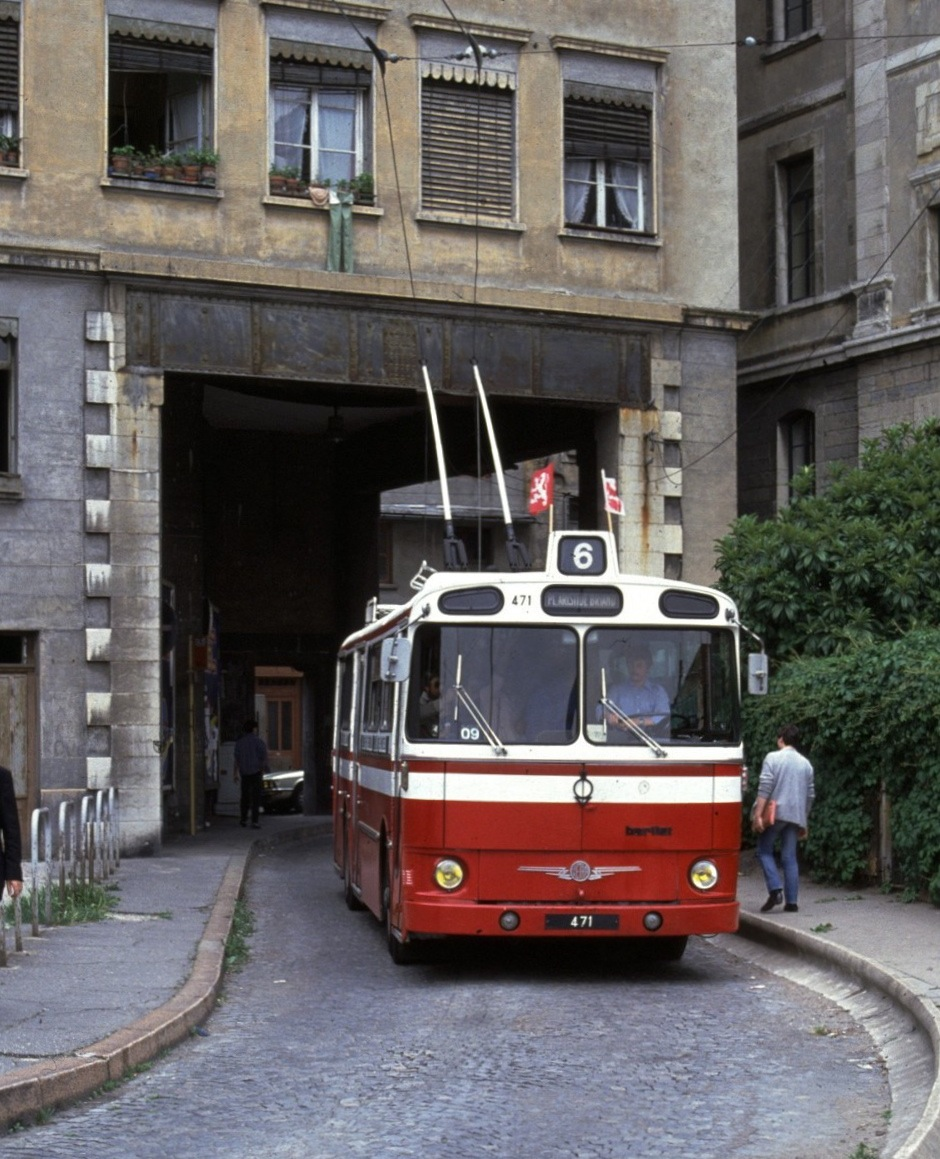
A small fleet of short-chassis vehicles in Lyon were the last Vétra trolleybuses in service anywhere.

By 1983, with the retirement of St. Etienne's last Vétra trolleybuses, Limoges and Lyon were the only systems anywhere that continued to use Vétras in service. The last active examples in Limoges were ex-Paris VBRh vehicles built in 1949–54, and these were retired in June 1989. This left the Lyon trolleybus system as the last operator of Vétra trolleybuses anywhere.

Although Lyon once had a large fleet of Vétra trolleybuses, by late 1981 all that remained were ones from a batch of 22 VBH85 trolleybuses, built jointly by Vétra and Berliet in 1963, which had a short chassis and were used only on Lyon route 6, which follows narrow streets and has hairpin turns. In 1984/85, Lyon operator TCL chose to refurbish seven of these, rather than buy a new batch of non-standard-length trolleybuses just for one route. As a result, these last Vétra trolleybuses (renumbered 1701–1707) received an extended life, remaining in service until early 2000.

== Preservation ==
More than 30 Vétra-built trolleybuses have been preserved, with 33 examples accounted for as of 2000, all but four being in France.

=== By operators ===
Some are owned by transit agencies that are currently still operate trolleybuses, but the vehicles concerned may or may not be in operating condition. The Limoges trolleybus system has preserved 1944/45 CB60 No. 18, and the Lyon system has preserved 1962 Vétra-Berliet ELR No. 10 (which is ex-Marseille 331 in 1977). The St. Etienne system has preserved three different examples: 1952 VCR No. 72, 1955 VA3B2 No. 151 (ex-Marseille 155), and 1962 VBBh/ELR No. 126.

=== At museums ===
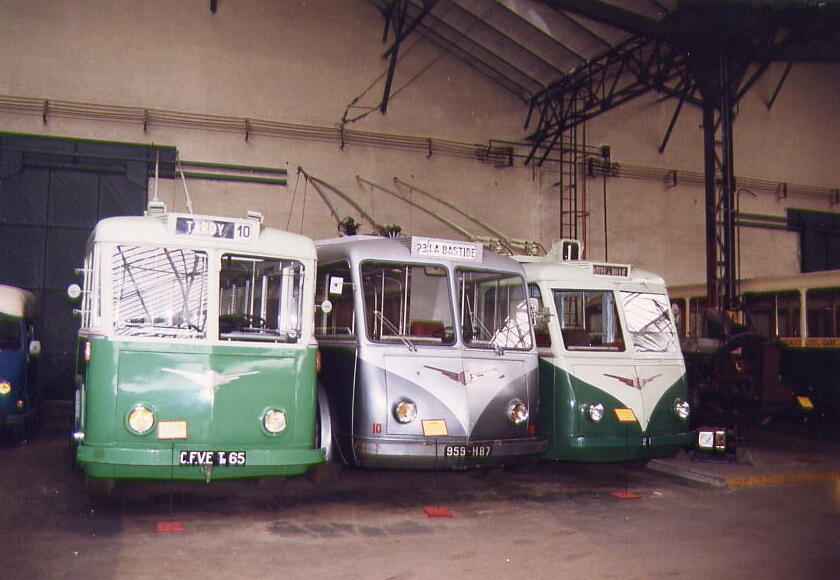
Three restored Vétra trolleybuses on display at the Musée des transports urbains, interurbains et ruraux, in Paris

Most of the surviving Vétra trolleybuses are in the collections of museums or preservation groups. The largest number, by far, is owned by the Association pour le Musée des Transports Urbains, Interurbains et Ruraux (AMTUIR), in Paris, which counted 10 Vétra trolleybuses in its collection as of 2000. The Musée Provençal des Transports Urbains et Ruraux (MPTUR), in La Barque, has three Vétra trolleybuses. The Amis du Rail et des Transports de Marseille (ARTM), in Marseille, has two.

At least three Vétra trolleybuses are preserved outside France, including Limoges No. 5 (a 1943 CB60), which is owned by an individual but is kept at The Trolleybus Museum at Sandtoft, in the UK, and operates occasionally at the museum. Lyon 1704, a 1963 Vétra-Berliet VBH85, from the batch that were the very last Vétra trolleybuses in service anywhere, joined the Sandtoft collection in 2006.

== See also ==
- List of trolleybus systems in France
