= Vetra =

Vetra may refer to:

- Vétra, the Société des Véhicules et Tracteurs Electriques, a French manufacturer of trolleybuses and electric locomotives, founded in 1925, dissolved in 1964
- FK Vėtra, a Lithuanian football team from the capital city of Vilnius
- Vētra, a Latvian surname
- Canale Vetra, or Canale Vepra, Milan artificial canal dating back to ancient Roman times
