= List of trolleybus systems in France =

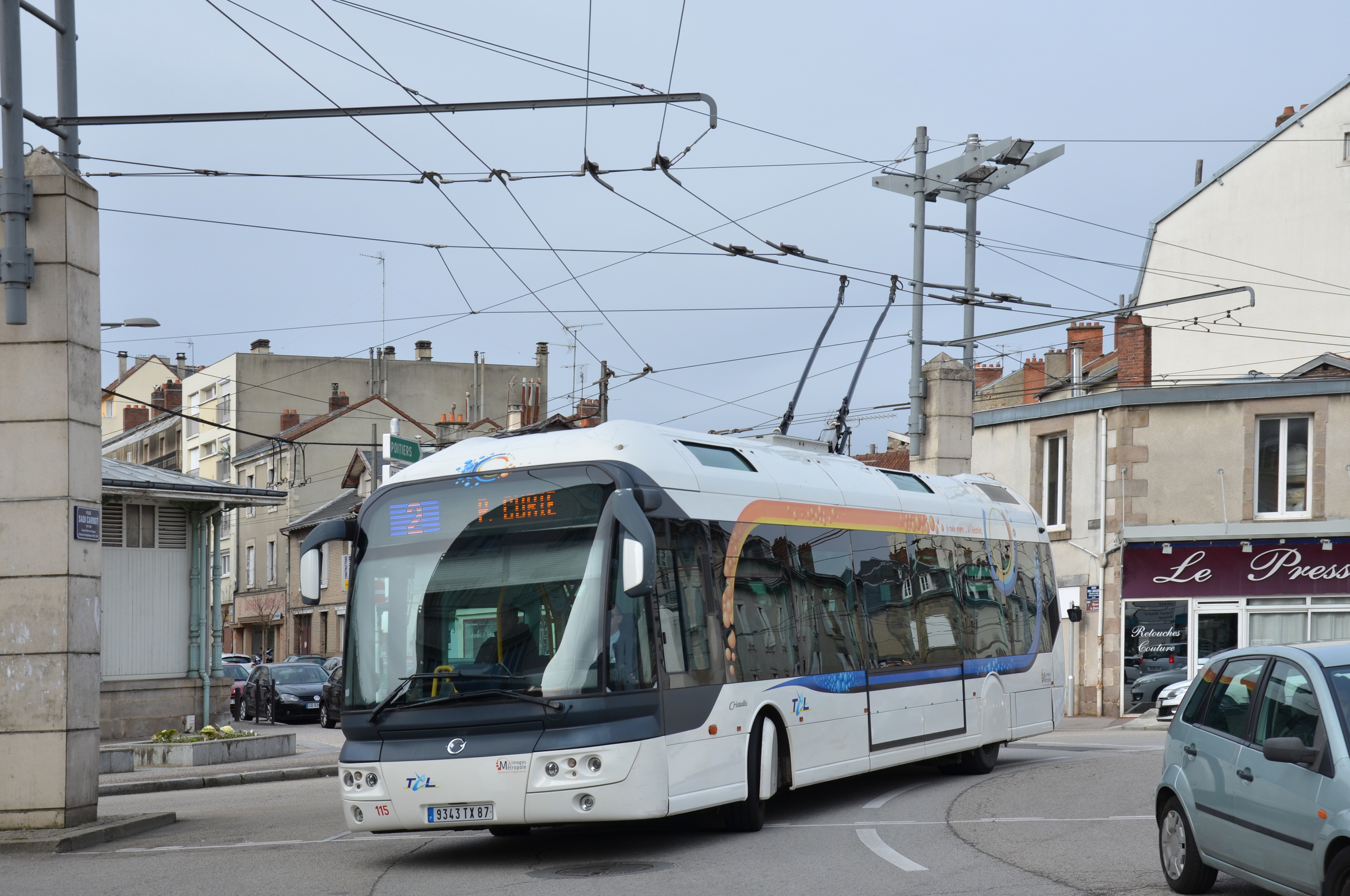
Irisbus Cristalis in Limoges

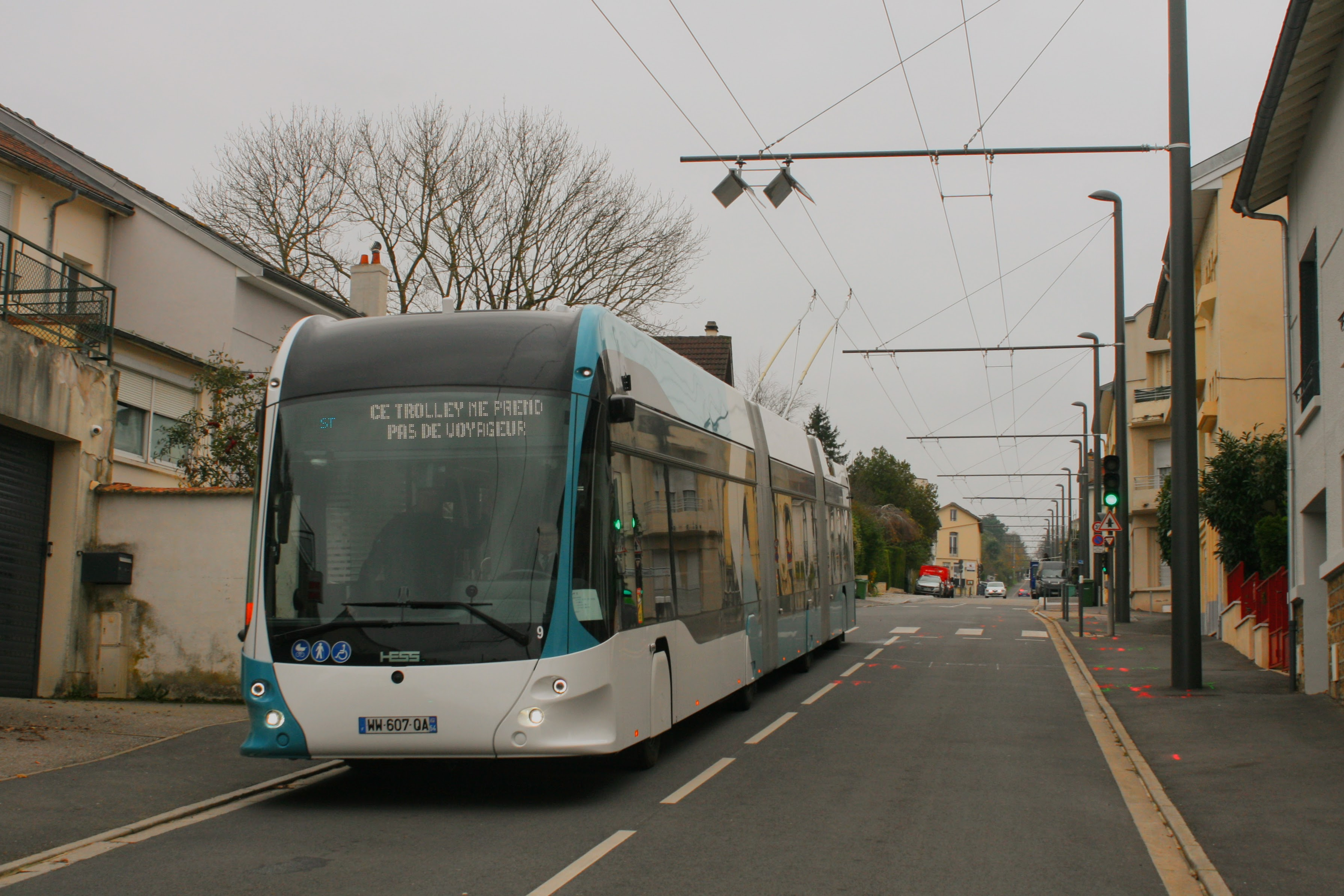
A Hess trolleybus in Nancy

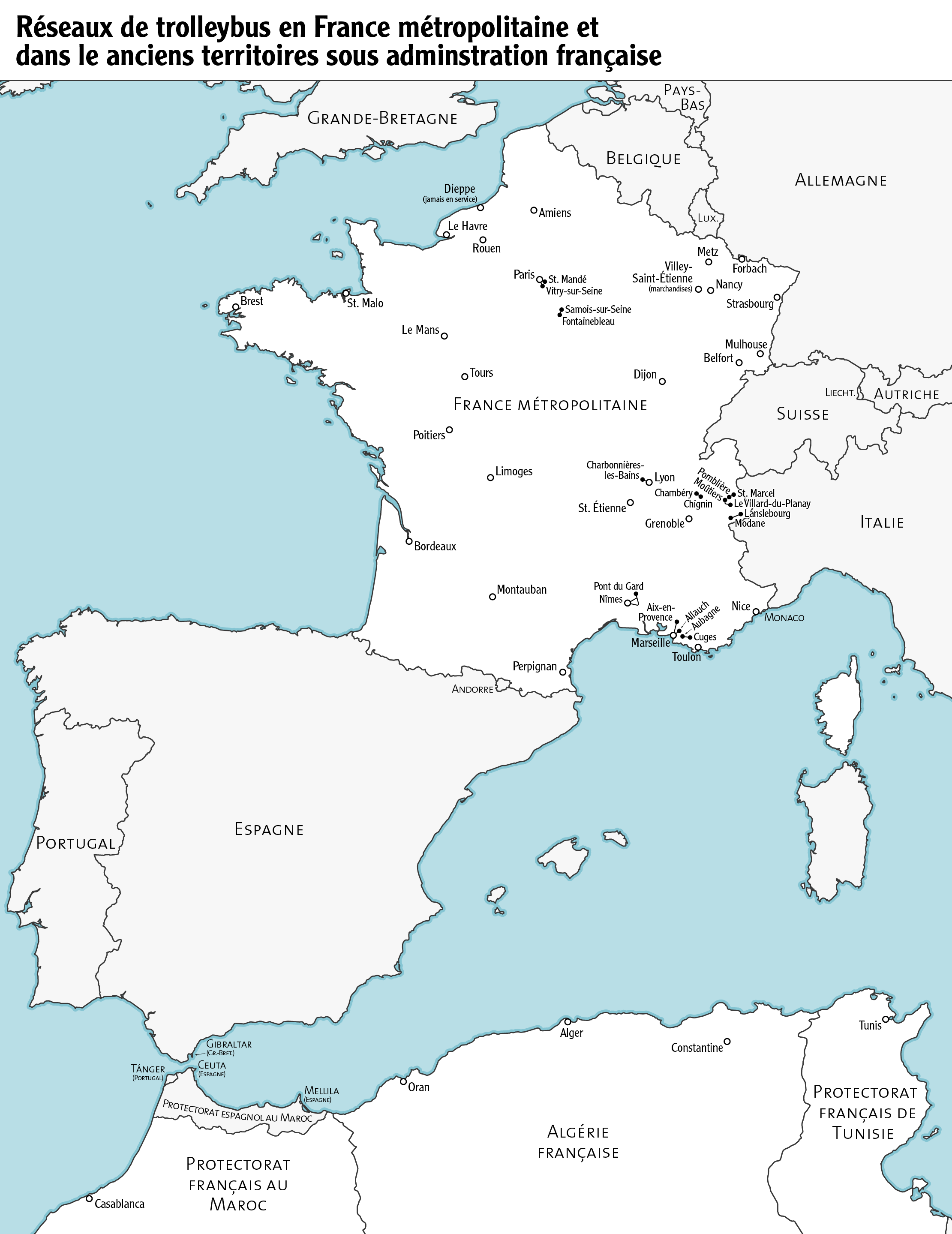
Map of all trolleybus systems, past and present, in France and in the former territories under French administration

This is a list of trolleybus systems in France by region. It includes all trolleybus systems, past and present. Bold text indicates a system that is still operating.

== Alsace ==
| Name of system | Location | Date (from) | Date (to) | Notes |
|---|---|---|---|---|
| Gleislose Bahn Mühlhausen | Mulhouse | 9 October 1908 | 14 July 1918 | See also Trolleybus de Mulhouse (in French) for the first system, German denomination Gleislose Bahn Mühlhausen for the first system, because Mulhouse was part of German Empire until 1918. |
| Gleislose Bahn Mühlhausen | Mulhouse | 5 July 1946 | 1968 | See also Trolleybus de Mulhouse (in French) for the first system, German denomination Gleislose Bahn Mühlhausen for the first system, because Mulhouse was part of German Empire until 1918. |
| | Strasbourg | 27 May 1939 | 31 March 1962 | |

== Aquitaine ==
| Name of system | Location | Date (from) | Date (to) | Notes |
|---|---|---|---|---|
| | Bordeaux | May 1940 | 1954 | |

== Burgundy ==
| Name of system | Location | Date (from) | Date (to) | Notes |
|---|---|---|---|---|
| | Dijon | 7 January 1950 | 30 March 1966 | |

== Brittany ==
| Name of system | Location | Date (from) | Date (to) | Notes |
|---|---|---|---|---|
| | Brest | 29 July 1947 | 1970 | |
| | Saint-Malo | 1906 | 5 June 1907 | Electrobus designed by Louis Lombard-Gérin made by Compagnie de Traction par Trolley Automoteur, and run by Société des Tracteurs Breton. |
| | Saint-Malo | 10 July 1948 | 30 September 1959 | |

== Centre-Val de Loire ==
| Name of system | Location | Date (from) | Date (to) | Notes |
|---|---|---|---|---|
| | Tours | 5 October 1947 | 29 June 1968 | See also Trolleybuses in Tours. |

== Franche-Comté ==
| Name of system | Location | Date (from) | Date (to) | Notes |
|---|---|---|---|---|
| | Belfort | 4 July 1952 | 1 August 1972 | |

== Upper Normandy ==
| Name of system | Location | Date (from) | Date (to) | Notes |
|---|---|---|---|---|
| | Le Havre | 1 August 1947 | 28 December 1970 | |
| | Rouen | 2 January 1933 | 26 June 1970 | |

== Île-de-France ==
| Name of system | Location | Date (from) | Date (to) | Notes |
|---|---|---|---|---|
| | Fontainebleau | 12 June 1901 | 30 August 1913 | Louis Lombard-Gérin, first commercial trolleybus route. |
| | Paris | 2 August 1900 | 12 November 1900 | at Vincennes, Lombard-Gérin. |
| | Paris | 1912 | 1914 | at Saint-Mandé. Mercedes-Stoll. Also January 1922 demonstration. |
| | ♦ Vitry-sur-Seine | 7 April 1925 | 8 July 1935 | |
| | ♦ Porte de Champerret – Bezons / Argenteuil | 8 January 1943 | 31 March 1962 | |
| | ♦ Porte de Choisy – Choisy-le-Roi and Porte d'Italie – Thiais | 16 January 1950 | 31 March 1966 | |

== Languedoc-Roussillon ==
| Name of system | Location | Date (from) | Date (to) | Notes |
|---|---|---|---|---|
| | Nîmes – Remoulins | 10 July 1924 | 31 December 1927 | |
| | Perpignan | 21 September 1952 | June 1968 | |

== Limousin ==
| Name of system | Location | Date (from) | Date (to) | Notes |
|---|---|---|---|---|
| | **Limoges** | 14 July 1943 | | See also Trolleybuses in Limoges. |

== Lorraine ==
| Name of system | Location | Date (from) | Date (to) | Notes |
|---|---|---|---|---|
| | Forbach | 19 May 1951 | 1 November 1969 | |
| | Metz | 14 September 1947 | 30 April 1966 | |
| | **Nancy** | 27 September 1982 | | See Trolleybuses in Nancy. |

== Midi-Pyrénées ==
| Name of system | Location | Date (from) | Date (to) | Notes |
|---|---|---|---|---|
| | Montauban | January 1903 | 1904 | Lombard-Gerin. |

== Pays de la Loire ==
| Name of system | Location | Date (from) | Date (to) | Notes |
|---|---|---|---|---|
| | Le Mans | 13 November 1947 | 1969 | |

== Picardy ==
| Name of system | Location | Date (from) | Date (to) | Notes |
|---|---|---|---|---|
| | Amiens | 1946 | February 1963 | |

== Poitou-Charentes ==
| Name of system | Location | Date (from) | Date (to) | Notes |
|---|---|---|---|---|
| | Poitiers | 9 August 1943 | 3 March 1965 | |

== Provence-Alpes-Côte d'Azur ==
| Name of system | Location | Date (from) | Date (to) | Notes |
|---|---|---|---|---|
| | Aubagne – Cuges-les-Pins | 19 September 1927 | 20 July 1958 | |
| | Marseille | 13 June 1903 | 1 September 1905 | First system, Lombard-Gerin, connected Allauch and La Rose. |
| | Marseille | 26 April 1942 | 25 June 2004 | Second system included an interurban line to Aix-en-Provence. |
| | Nice | 30 April 1942 | 12 September 1970 | |
| | Toulon | 7 May 1949 | 19 February 1973 | |

== Rhône-Alpes ==
| Name of system | Location | Date (from) | Date (to) | Notes |
|---|---|---|---|---|
| | Chambéry | 6 October 1930 | June 1940 | |
| | Grenoble | 1 August 1947 | 24 June 1999 | |
| | **Lyon** | 1 September 1905 | 10 September 1906 | First system, Schiemann, located at Charbonnières-les-Bains. |
| | **Lyon** | 4 September 1935 | – | See also Trolleybuses in Lyon. |
| | Modane - Lanslebourg | 20 August 1923 | June 1940 | |
| | Moûtiers – Salins (-les-Thermes) | 15 April 1930 | March 1965 | |
| | **Saint-Étienne** | 1 January 1942 | | System included an interurban line to Firminy. See also Trolleybuses in Saint-Étienne. |

- Note: The former TVR, or GLT, system in Caen and the Translohr system in Clermont-Ferrand are not listed, as they are not commonly considered to be trolleybus systems, since their vehicles use(d) pantographs to collect current and therefore were not able to operate away from the surface guideway while remaining in electric mode. The GLT vehicles formerly used on the Nancy system, by comparison, were able to do so, as they used trolley poles to collect current, so the Nancy system continued to be considered a trolleybus system during its GLT era.

== See also ==
- List of trolleybus systems, for all other countries
- List of town tramway systems in France
- List of light-rail transit systems
- List of rapid transit systems
- Trolleybus usage by country

== Sources ==
=== Books and periodicals ===
- Bruce, Ashley. Lombard-Gerin and Inventing the Trolleybus Trolleybooks, 2017, ISBN 978-0-904235-25-8.
- Murray, Alan (2000). World Trolleybus Encyclopaedia. Reading, Berkshire, UK: Trolleybooks. ISBN 0-904235-18-1.
- Trolleybus Magazine, various issues. National Trolleybus Association (UK). Bimonthly. ISSN 0266-7452.
