= Trolleybuses in Nancy =

Electric public transport system in Nancy, France

Nancy trolleybus system
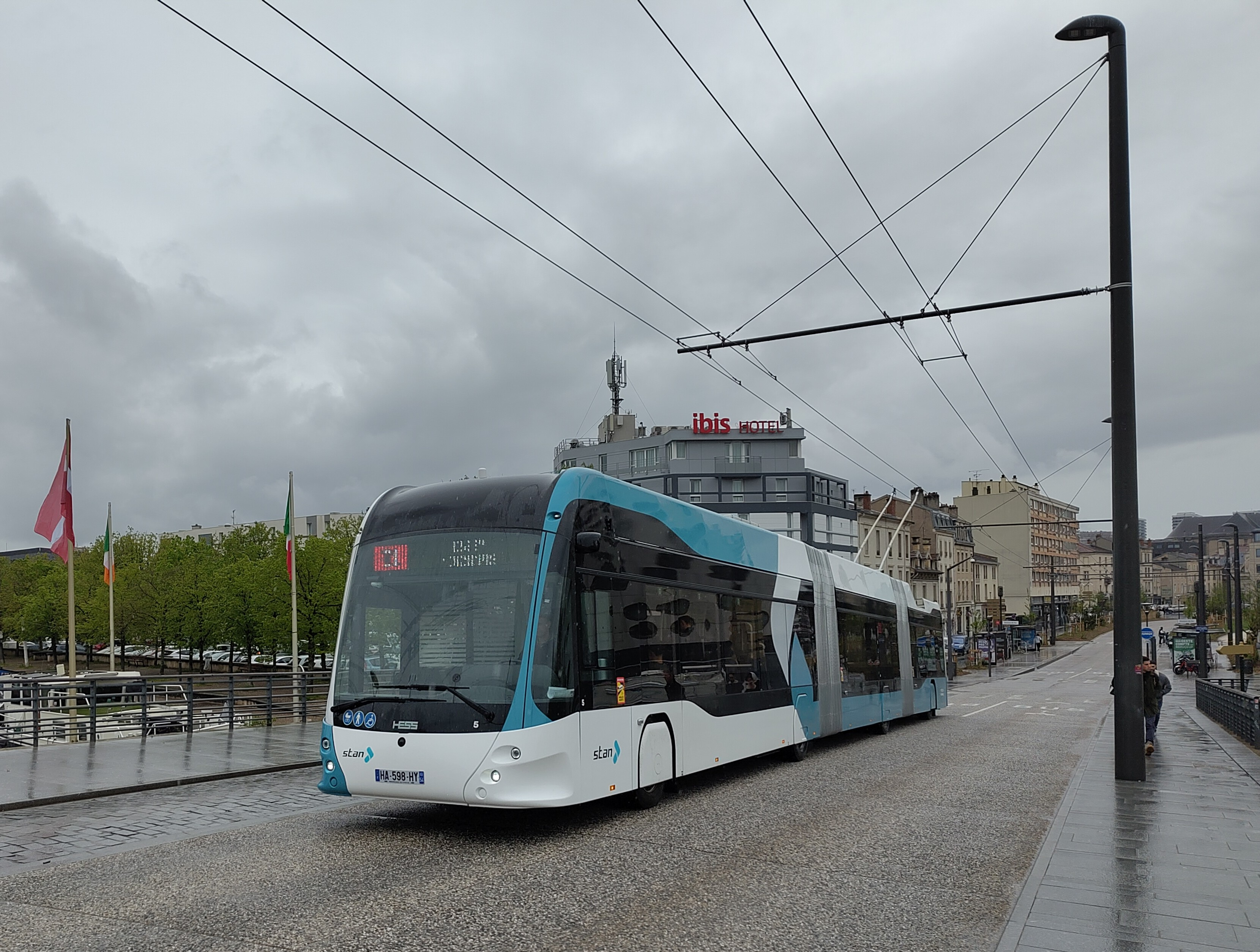
- A Hess trolleybus in service in 2025

Operation
- Locale: Nancy, Lorraine, France
- Open: 27 September 1982

Statistics
First era: 1982–1999
- System: Service de Transport de l'Agglomération Nancéienne (STAN)
- Routes: 5
- Owner: Métropole du Grand Nancy
- Operator: CGFTE
- Electrification: 750 V DC
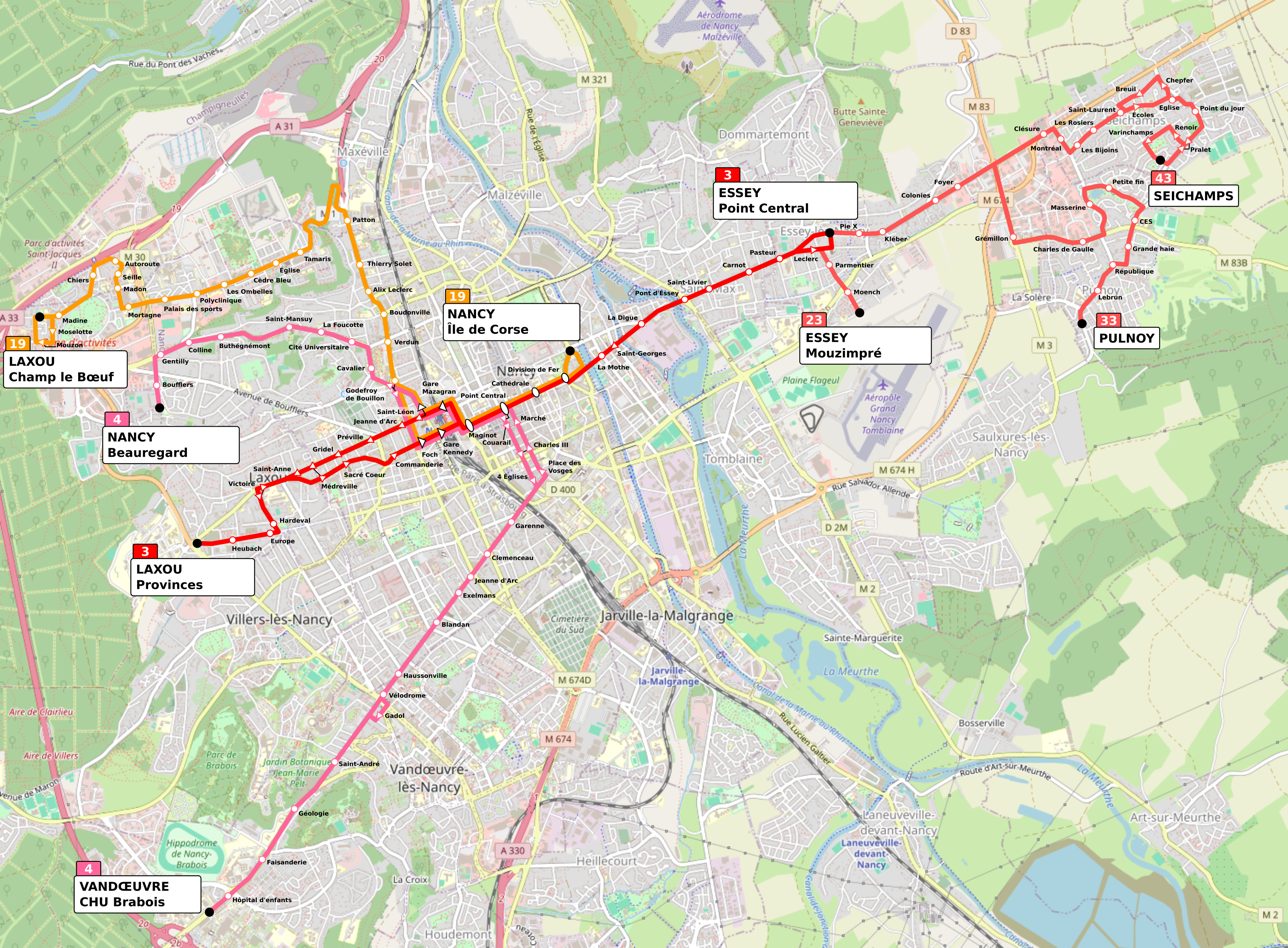
Second (GLT) era: 2000–2023
- System: STAN
- Routes: 1
- Owner: Métropole du Grand Nancy
- Operators: Transdev (2001–2018), and Keolis (2019–), still under the brand name STAN
- Route length: 10 km (6 mi)
Third era: since 2025
- Status: Open
- Operators: Keolis Grand Nancy, still branded locally as STAN
- Route length: 10 km (6 mi)

The Nancy trolleybus system (French: Réseau de trolleybus de Nancy) is part of the public transport network of the city of Nancy, France, and the neighboring comunes (municipalities) of Essey-lès-Nancy, Saint-Max and Vandœuvre-lès-Nancy. The trolleybus system opened in September 1982, and by one year later it had grown to three fully trolleybus routes (3, 4, and 19). Three additional services were introduced that did not require any additional overhead trolley wires, as the fleet consisted of Renault dual-mode buses that could use the wiring of route 3 and then continue (as routes 23, 33, or 43) in diesel mode beyond the end of the wiring. Trolleybus service on route 3 ended in 1996, leaving only routes 4 and 19 in operation.

Trolleybus operation on the remaining routes was suspended in 1999 to permit the conversion of the system's most heavily used corridor into a guided bus route, still using trolleybuses but now with the Bombardier Guided Light Transit (GLT) system over the majority of a new route T1, which was formed by combining the southern part of routes 4 and 19 with the northern part of route 3 and would be marketed as the "tram" line. The Bombardier trolleybuses used the GLT guide rail on around two-thirds of the route, and operated without any surface guidance on a little more than one-third of the route. Passenger service on this 10-kilometre-long (6 mi) route from CHU Brabois to Essey-lès-Nancy began in January 2001. Technical problems related to the guide rail led to a one-year suspension of service soon after route T1 opened, along with much shorter suspensions later in 2002 and in 2003.

In 2017, with the Bombardier GLT trolleybuses within a few years of the end of their predicted lifespan, the metropolitan council decided to replace the "tram"-branded trolleybus line with a true tramway by 2022. However, in 2021, those plans were dropped, and an order was placed with Carrosserie Hess for new, conventional (unguided) trolleybuses to replace the GLT vehicles. The surface guidance system was removed in 2023–2024, with trolleybus service suspended from mid-March 2023 to permit that work and some revisions to the overhead wiring. The first of the new Hess trolleybuses was delivered in March 2024, and the trolleybus system reopened in April 2025.

== History ==
=== 1980s and 1990s ===
In March 1980, the city council voted to create a network of trolleybus routes, with a planned initial fleet of 48 articulated vehicles. Three routes were planned initially. An order for 48 Renault PER 180H dual-mode trolleybuses was approved by the council on 21 November 1980. Construction of the infrastructure was underway by 1981, and the first test trip was made on 20 October 1981 using a prototype PER 180H trolleybus. Delivery of the production series of vehicles began in May 1982.

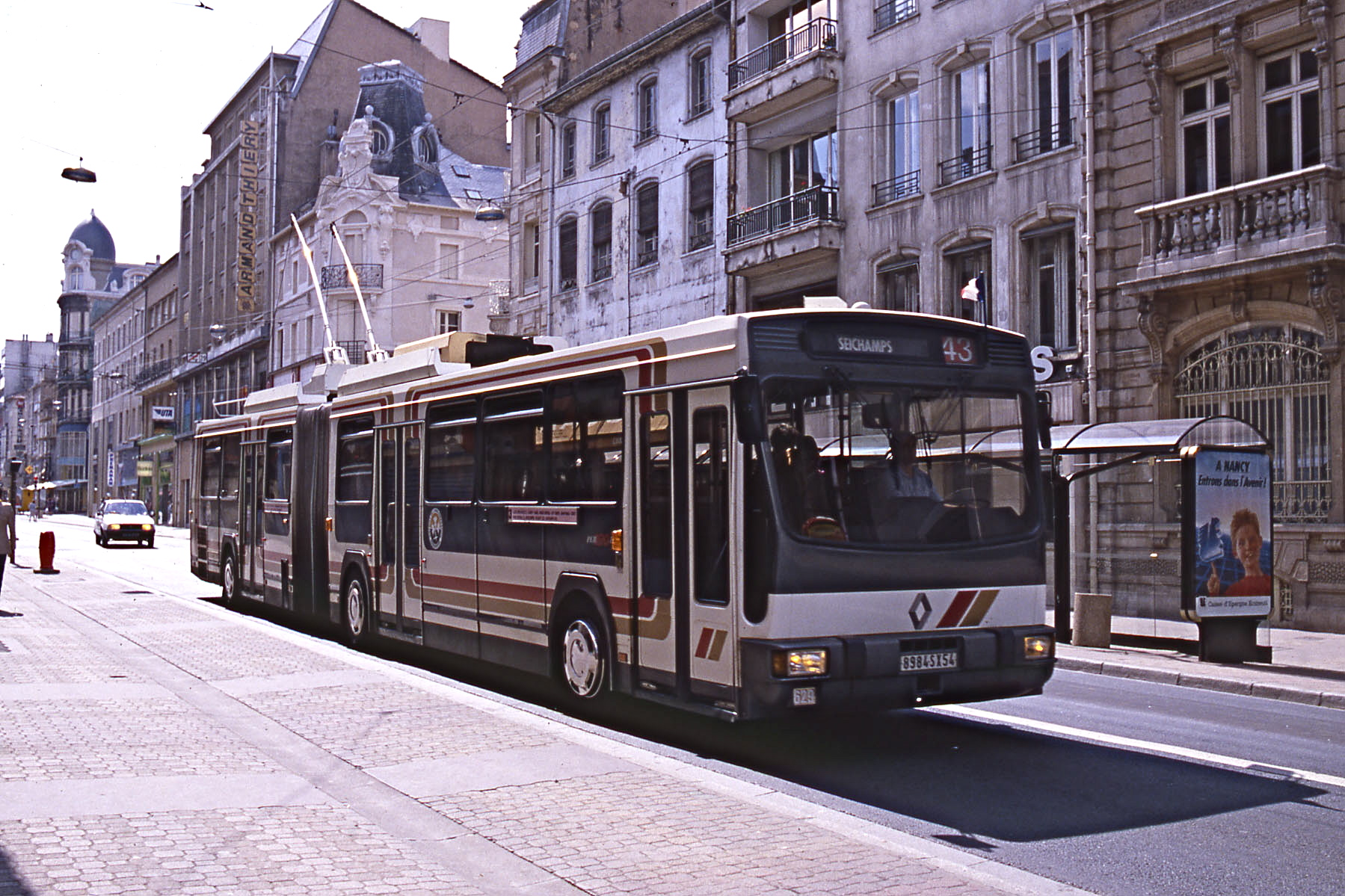
Nancy Renault trolleybus 629 on route 43 in 1986

Trolleybus service in Nancy began on 27 September 1982, on the first route, route 19 (Ile de Corse – Laxou, Champ le Boeuf), which was 9.5 km long. It was the first new trolleybus system to open in France since that of Perpignan, in 1952. Route 4 (Centre Hospitalier Régional Universitaire [CHU] de Brabois – Beauregard), 10.5 km, was converted to trolleybus operation on 20 December 1982, and lastly route 3 (Laxou Provinces – Essey), 7 km, became trolleybus-operated on 4 September 1983. Dual-mode buses were chosen to permit the vehicles to run a portion of each trip in diesel mode, on sections not equipped with overhead wires. This was planned to be used on route 3, and from the start of trolleybus service on that route, vehicles proceeded beyond the end of the wires at route 3's Essey terminus, on diesel power, as either route 33 to Pulnoy or route 43 to Seichamps. A similar operation of route 23 to Mouzimpré was introduced subsequently, but was withdrawn in October 1984.

The new system include some sections with steep gradients, the steepest being 13 per cent on Avenue Jean-Jaurès just south of St-André stop.

Trolleybus operation on route 3 was discontinued around 1996. In 1998, route 19 was extended along route 4 to CHU Brabois, which is located in the comune of Vandoeuvre.

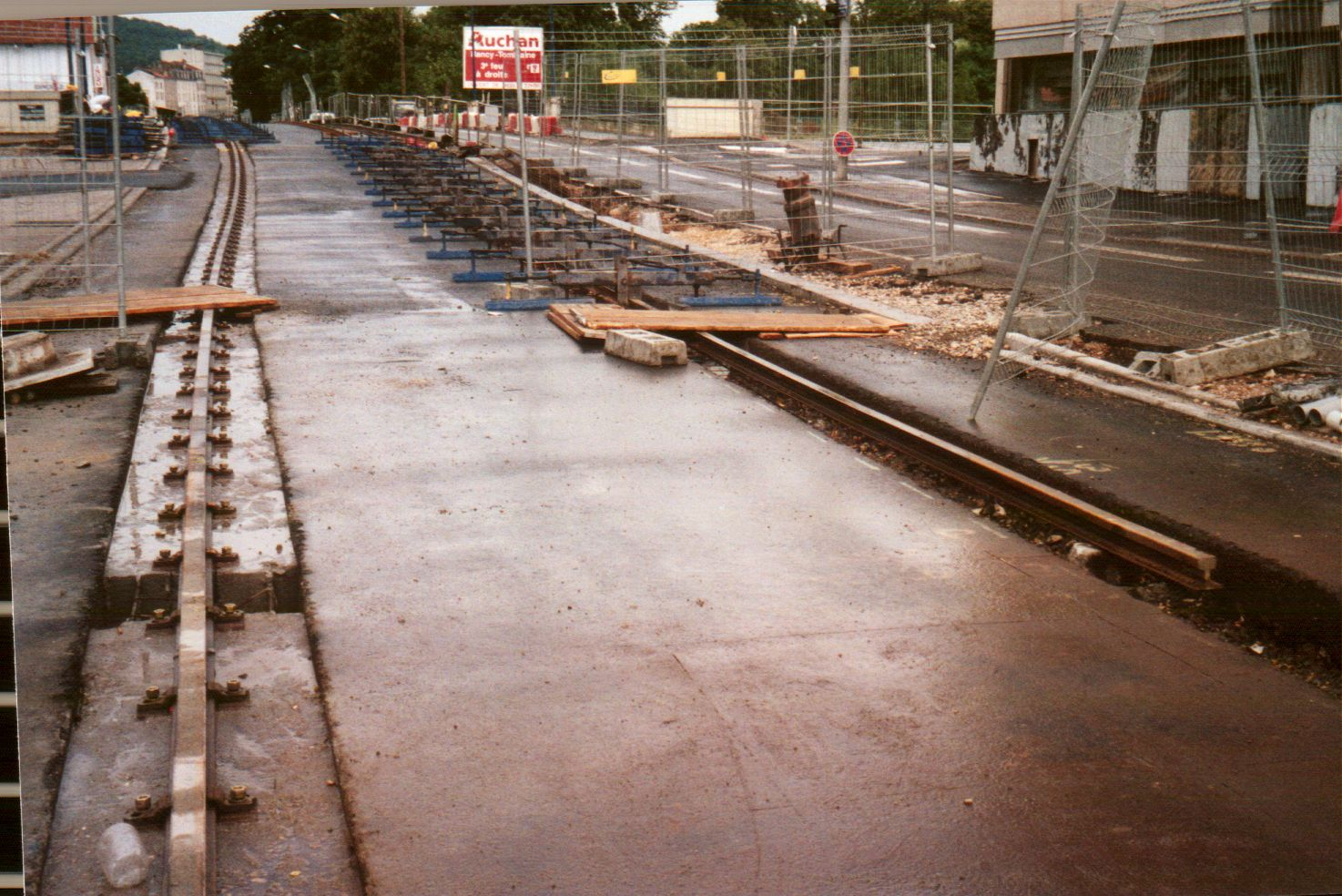
The GLT guide rails under construction in 2001

Earlier in 1998, plans were under consideration to convert the section between Essey and CHU Brabois, combining the southern half of route 4 (and also later 19) and the northern/eastern half of route 3, into a busway route using guided trolleybuses, and these plans were confirmed at the end of November with the announcement that a contract had been signed with Bombardier Transportation for the supply of 25 trolleybuses equipped with its Guided Light Transit technology (TVR in French), which uses a central guide rail just below the roadway surface. The new service was forecast to begin at the end of 2000, and compressed natural gas motorbuses were expected to be used temporarily during the conversion work.

As work to convert much of the trolleybus system into a GLT guided busway proceeded, some trolleybus operation continued, but by 1999 many of the Renault dual-mode trolleybuses had had their trolley poles removed and were operating in diesel mode at all times. The overhead wiring had been temporarily removed along parts of the route by September 1999, during the construction. It was later reported that all trolleybus operation had apparently been suspended by mid-September 1999. It was planned that route 4's section to Beauregard would be connected to a section of bus route 40 that would be newly equipped with overhead wires and would continue to use conventional trolleybuses. Seven two-axle trolleybuses were on order from AnsaldoBreda for this service. It was also planned that the initial GLT route would split at Vélodrome and have two branches south from there within Vandoeuvre. The main route would run to CHU Brabois, while an approximately 1.3 km (0.81 mi) branch would run along Boulevard de l'Europe to Avenue Jeanne d'Arc, without guide rail; this would make the total length of route 1, including both branches, 11.4 km (7.1 mi). However, the branch to Avenue Jeanne d'Arc was later dropped from the plans.

=== 2000s and 2010s: GLT ===
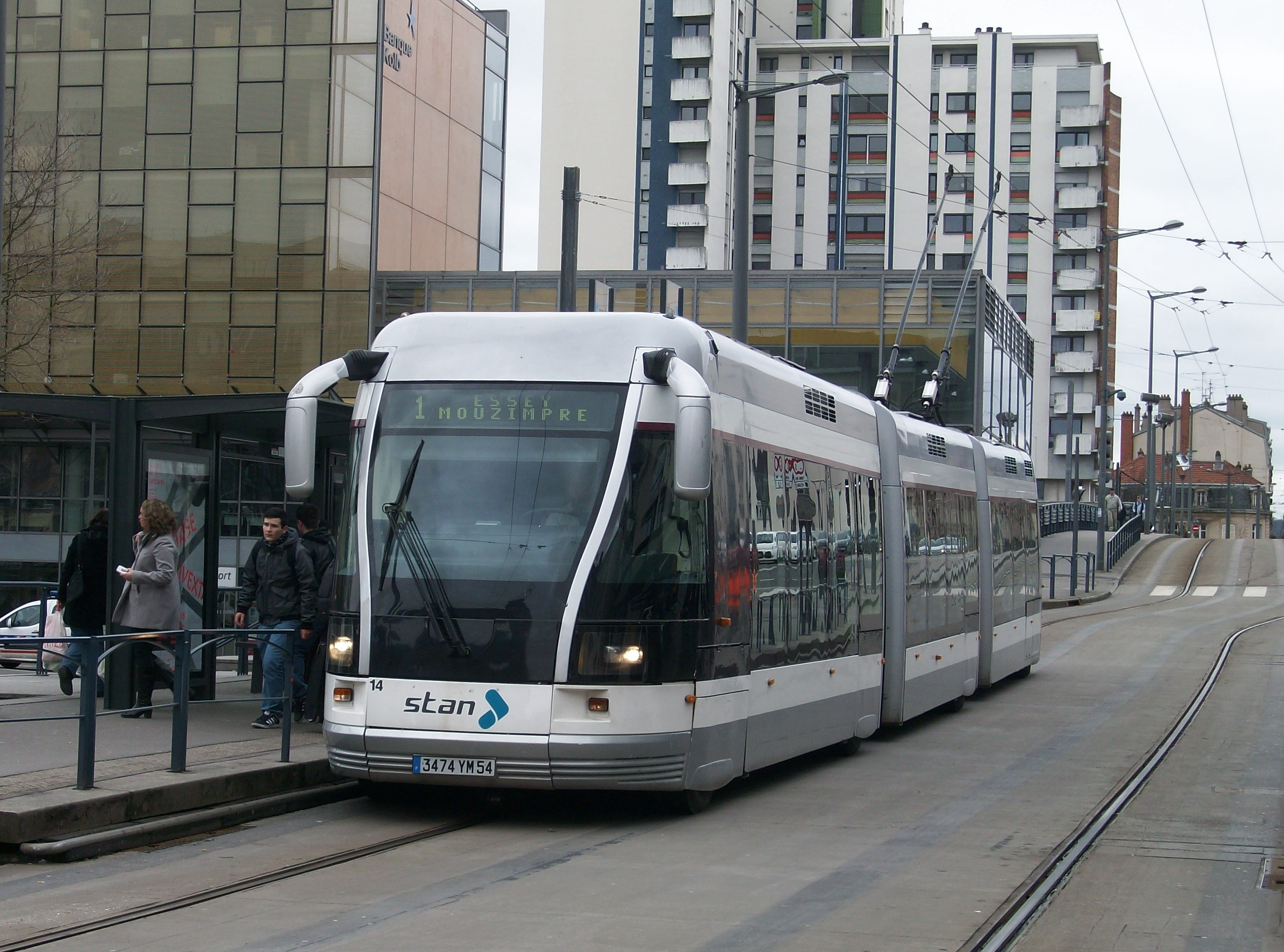
A Bombardier trolleybus using the GLT/TVR guide rail in 2015

The first of the 25 new Bombardier GLT/TVR trolleybuses, which were double-articulated vehicles 24.5 metres long, was delivered on 26 May 2000, and the first of the seven AnsaldoBreda conventional two-axle trolleybuses had arrived by June 2000.

The GLT guided-trolleybus route was officially opened on 8 December 2000, but regular public service did not begin until 28 January 2001. It was branded as "Tram" line 1 (or T1) by operator STAN, although it was not actually a tram line. The route, connecting Vandoevre CHU Brabois with Essey (combining the southern part of former route 4 with the northern portion of former route 3), used a guide rail for about two-thirds of its length; over the remainder of the route the vehicles operated as conventional trolleybuses, without any surface guidance (and thereby able to move laterally away from the overhead wires for a distance of up to a few metres). The unguided sections were on the outer parts of the route, specifically around 2.4 km between Callot and CHS Brabois, except for 275 metres around the terminus, and a portion of the route section to and from Essey. A 230-metre-long (750 ft) section of Avenue Jean-Jaurès in Vandœuvre has only a single lane for both directions, controlled by signals, and trolleybuses are the only vehicles permitted to run in the southbound direction there.

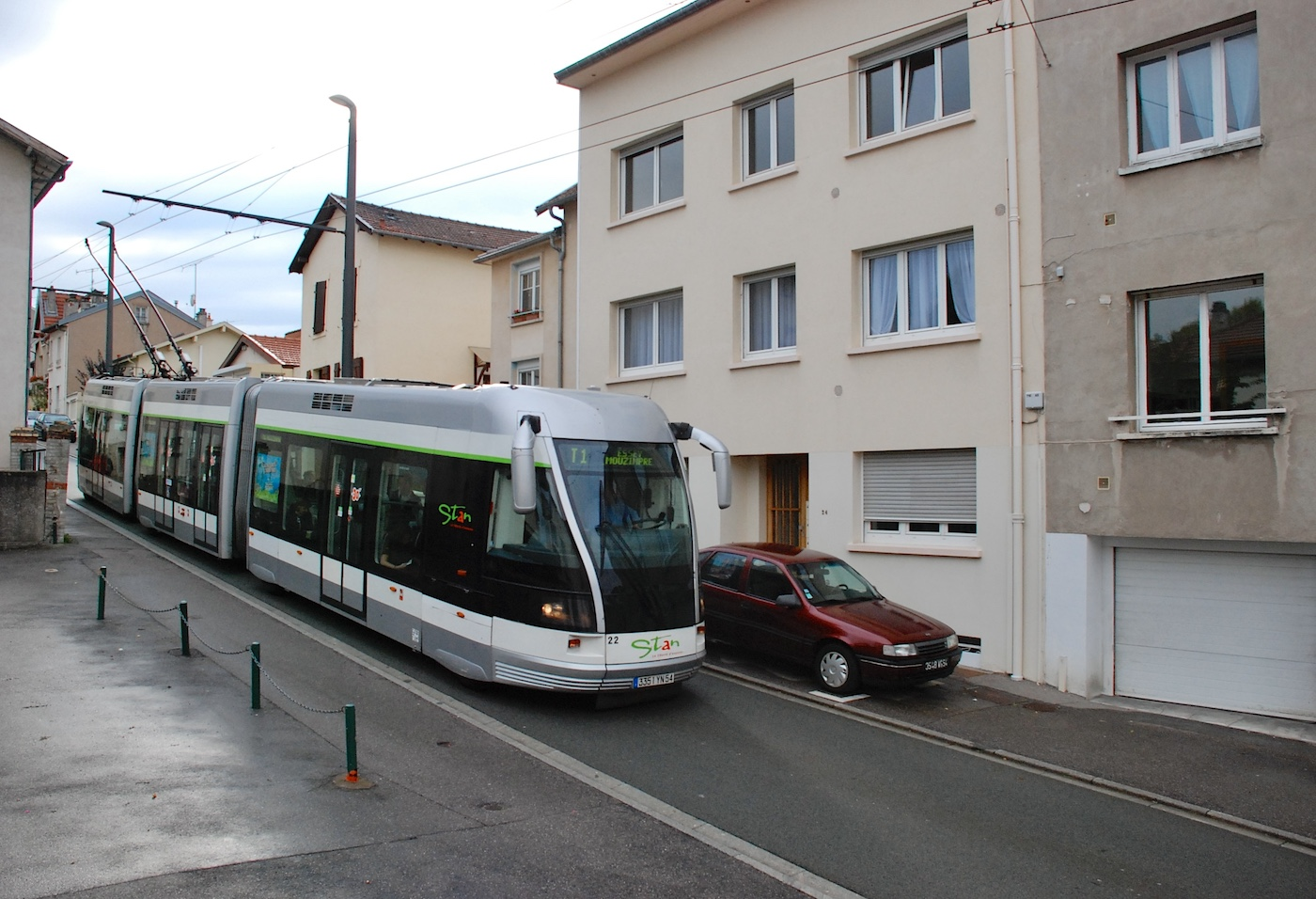
A trolleybus northbound on Av. Jean-Jaurès, a steep section without guide rail and with only one lane for both directions

However, following accidents on 6 March and 9 March 2001, when trolleybuses were changing from guided to unguided mode and struck adjacent overhead-wire support poles, all trolleybus operation was suspended indefinitely. Trolleybus Magazine later reported that, "The cause of the accidents that led to the temporary suspension of service was a functional failure of the retraction device for the mini-wheelset caused by deformation as a result of repeated vibration from the metal rail." After additional issues were identified and corrected, service finally resumed on 13 March 2002. In 2002, the scheduled daytime service required the use of approximately 14 of the 25 trolleybuses.

Meanwhile, a service reorganisation on 11 February 2001 saw former trolleybus route 4 renumbered as 121, but the plans to re-introduce trolleybuses on the route had not yet come to fruition, and motorbuses were providing the service. All seven of the new two-axle AnsaldoBreda F22 trolleybuses purchased for that service had been delivered by early 2002. Ultimately, these vehicles never entered service in Nancy. It was reported in 2011 that six of the seven had never been accepted by the transport company, because they were considered to be out of conformance with the specification, and in June 2010 a settlement was reached with the manufacturer, concluding a legal dispute that had lasted for several years. Those six vehicles were returned to the AnsaldoBreda factory in Italy in March 2011, while the seventh remained in Nancy. (They were subsequently sold to the Ancona trolleybus system.) Trolleybus service had not returned to route 121 (the Beauregard – Place de la République section of former route 4).

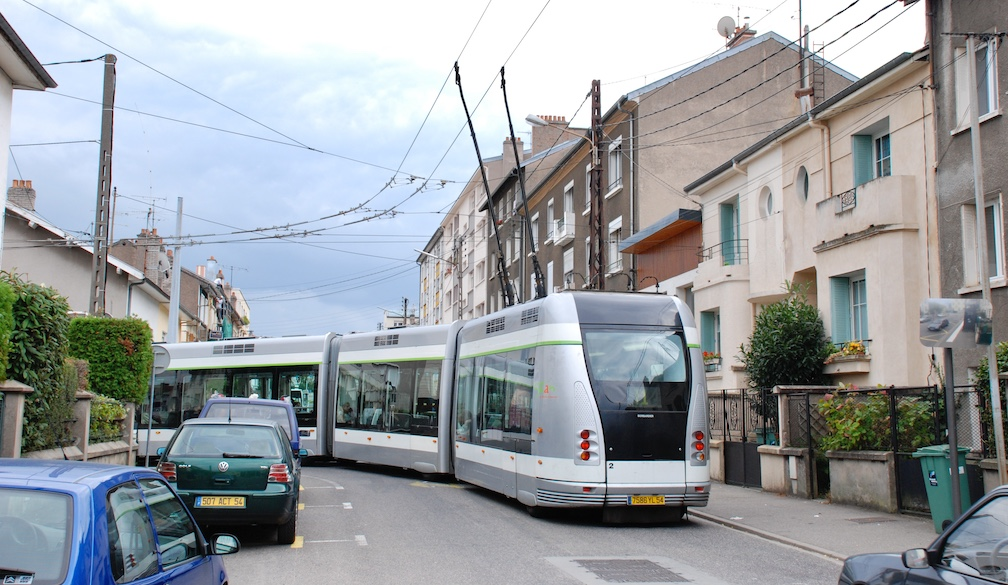
A minor route change in 2007 removed from route T1 this unguided turn at Rue Léon Blum and Rue Docteur Gadol, which had been part of former route 4.

Occasional problems with the guide rail equipment led to more suspensions of service, including one of 16 days in June 2002 and another lasting 23 days in August 2003. Plans to build a second guided-trolleybus route were dropped in 2011.

In 2017, the Nancy city council decided to close the trolleybus system by 2022 and to replace it with a conventional tramway. However, with the 12.5% gradient on the part of the route to CHU Brabois thought to be too steep for trams, studies would look at the feasibility of replacing that part of the route with one having a gradient of only 8.5%.

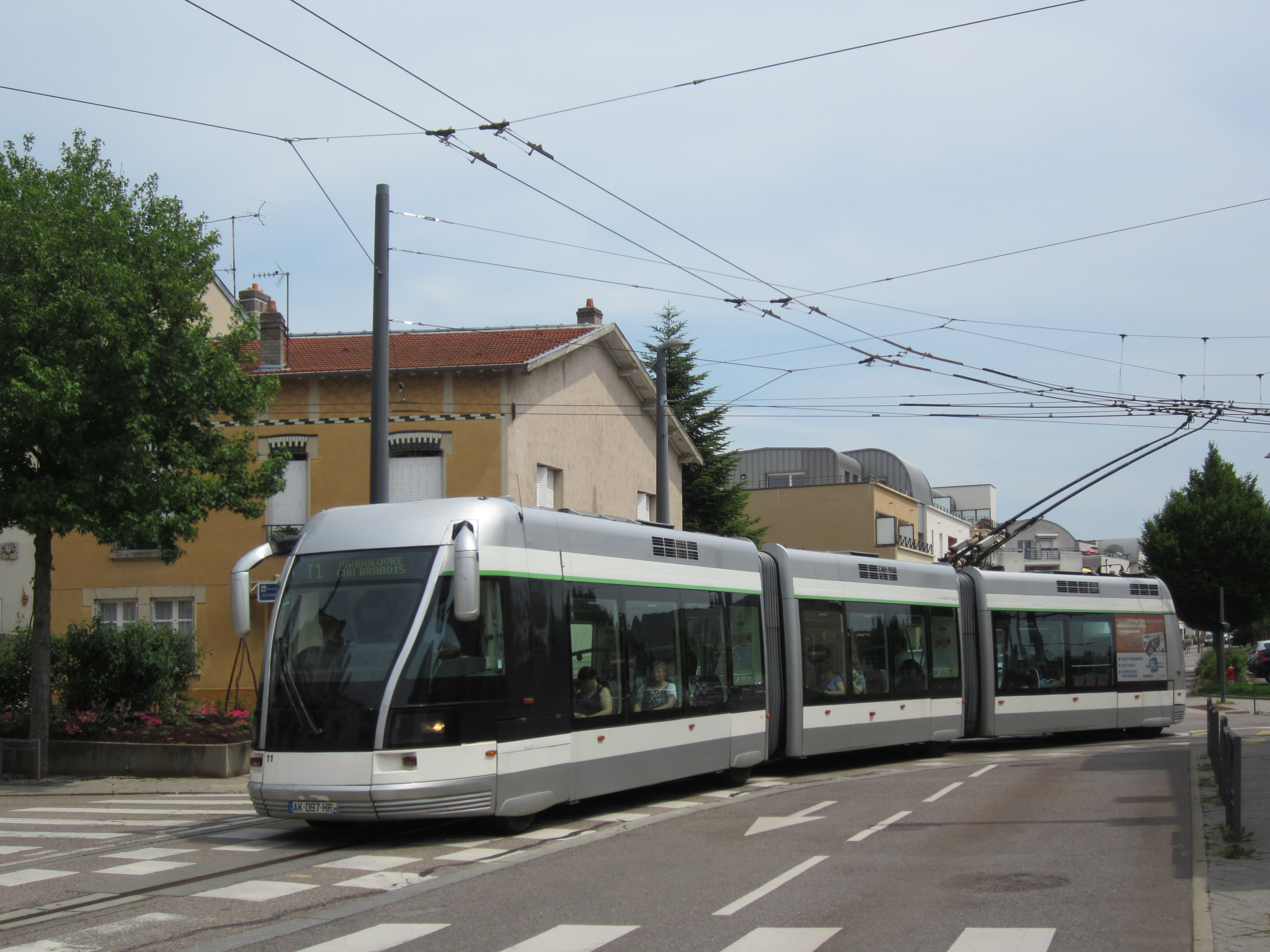
A Nancy GLT/TVR trolleybus in 2013

Meanwhile, 12 Bombardier GLT vehicles were acquired from the GLT system in Caen as a source of spare parts, to keep a sufficient number of Nancy's vehicles operating until then. Although the Caen vehicles used a pantograph instead of trolley poles to collect current, overall they shared about 90% of their components with the GLT vehicles in Nancy. The Caen system had closed at the end of 2017.

On 1 January 2019, Keolis became the operator of the local public transport system, having won the competitive tender, with a six-year contract. In June 2019, a new Iveco Crealis trolleybus built for the Limoges trolleybus system was tested in Nancy and used the wires of former route 3 to Laxou, revealing that that long-disused overhead wiring (out of use since circa 1996) was not only still in place but had been maintained in a usable condition for possible future use. At the end of the decade, the trolleybus system was expected to close in 2021 or 2022.

=== 2020s ===
Largely because of the forecast high cost, the Metropolitan Council of Greater Nancy voted in February 2021 to postpone the plans to build a tramway and to consider alternatives for replacement of the vehicles serving the trolleybus line. On 26 August 2021, the council voted to replace the existing Bombardier guided vehicles with new conventional (unguided) trolleybuses. In late 2021, this new plan was finalised – confirming that the trolleybus system would not be closed after all – and in January 2022 an order was placed with Carrosserie Hess to provide 25 new double-articulated trolleybuses of Hess's lighTram 25DC model. The route would remain the same as "tram" line T1, the 11-kilometre-long (6.8 mi) route from CHU Brabois to Essey-lès-Nancy, but now without any surface guidance system.

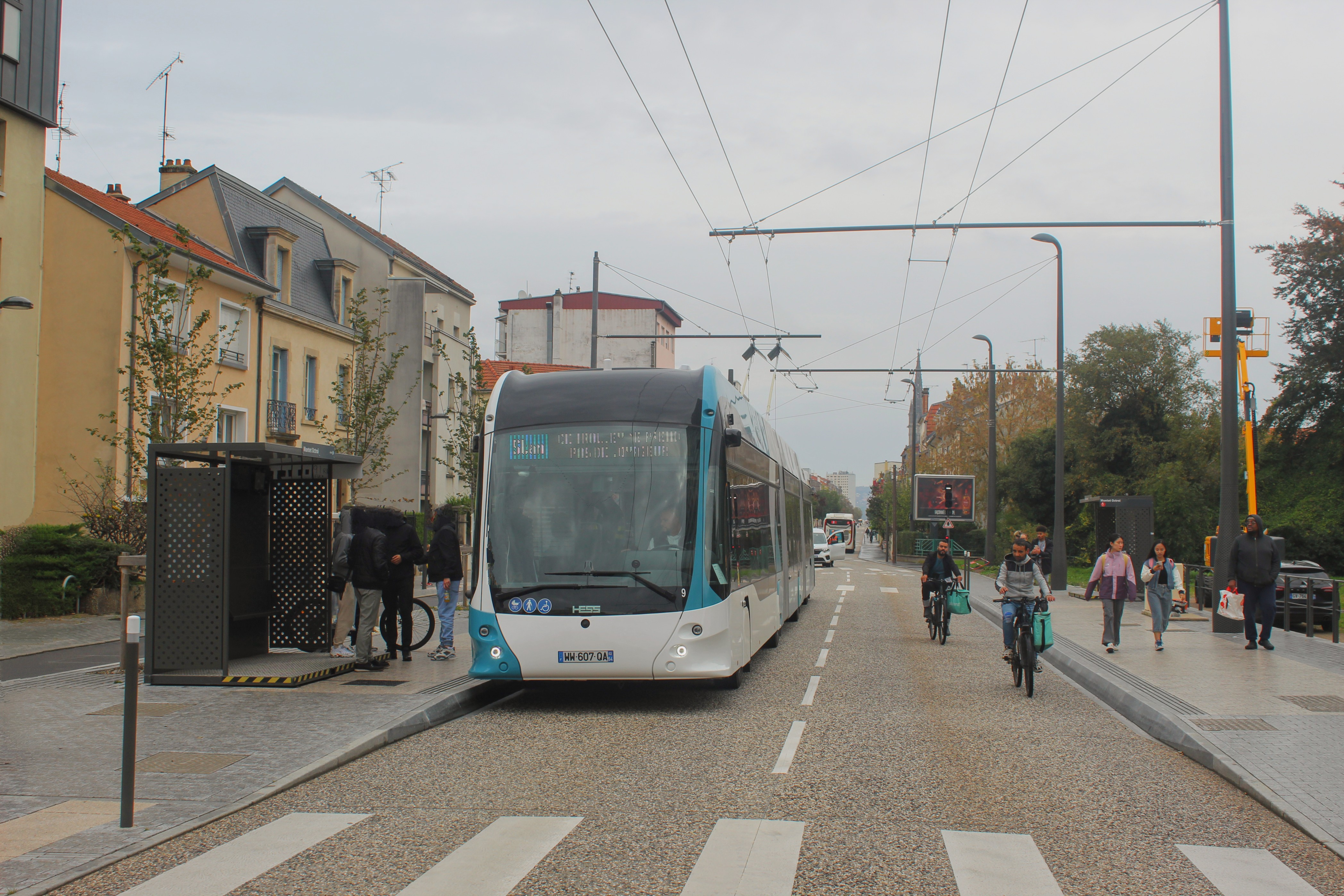
A Hess trolleybus on a testing or driver-training run in October 2024

The final day of guided trolleybus operation, using the Bombardier vehicles, was 12 March 2023. Buses would temporarily serve the route until the new vehicles had arrived and been accepted for service.

The first Hess trolleybus was delivered on 12 March 2024. Some sections of the route in the city centre will no longer be equipped with overhead wiring, and the new vehicles (which, like many newer trolleybuses, have batteries allowing part of each trip to be operated "off-wire") will serve those sections on battery power. In December 2024, the trolleybus line was expected to reopen in April 2025. It reopened on 5 April 2025.

== Fleet ==
=== Past fleet ===
- 48 Renault PER 180H dual-mode, articulated vehicles, 18 metres long (nos. 603–650); built 1982–1983. All withdrawn by 1999. One, no. 625, was preserved by a local enthusiast.
- 25 Bombardier GLT (TVR) double-articulated vehicles, 24.5 metres long (nos. 1–25); built 2000–2001, last units retired March 2023.

The following vehicles, Nancy's only non-articulated trolleybuses, were purchased and delivered but never used in service. Years later, in late 2011 or 2012, all but one of them were sold to the Ancona trolleybus system, in Italy, where they entered service in 2014.

- 7 AnsaldoBreda F22 trolleybuses (nos. 251–257); built 2000–2002. Never used in Nancy; all but no. 251 were sold in 2011/12.

=== Current fleet ===
- 25 Hess lighTram 25DC double-articulated trolleybuses, 24.4 m long; delivery began March 2024.

== See also ==
- List of trolleybus systems in France
