= Irisbus Cristalis =

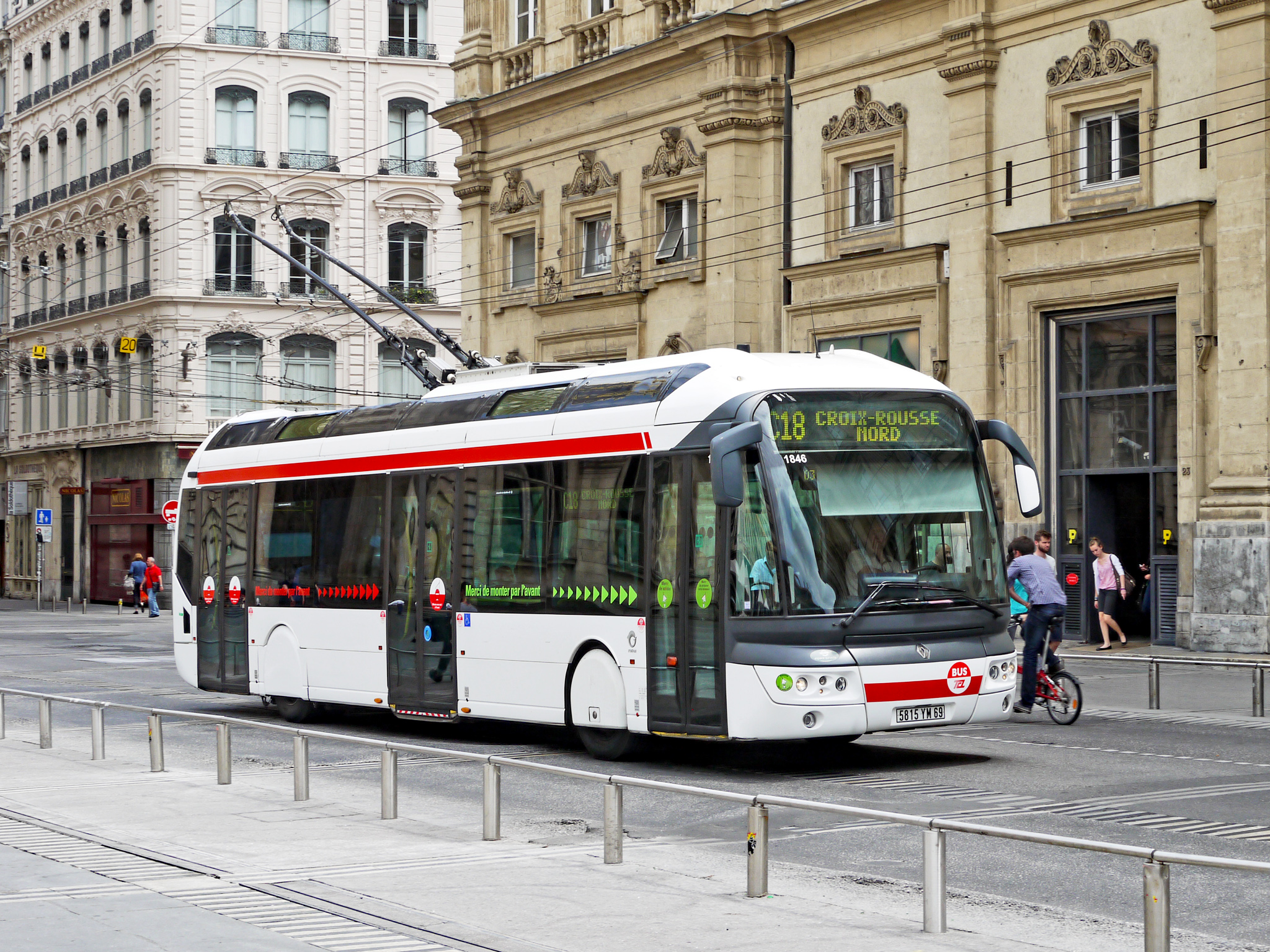
An Irisbus Cristalis ETB12 in Lyon in 2002

The Irisbus Cristalis is a trolleybus that was manufactured by Irisbus. It was introduced in 2000. The second of three prototypes, built was for the Lyon trolleybus system, was first presented to the public in Lyon in December 2000. The first vehicles of the type entered service in Lyon in January 2002. Cristalis trolleybuses were subsequently purchased by the Limoges trolleybus system and the St. Etienne trolleybus system, as well as the Milan trolleybus system, in Italy. For all units built, the electrical equipment was provided by Alstom. It was "radically different" from past French-built trolleybuses, in its use of wheel hub motors to allow an unobstructed low floor. The initial design work was undertaken by Renault, before the formation of Irisbus. Fifteen were also ordered by the Grenoble trolleybus system in 1999 (before series production of the Cristalis had even begun), but that order was cancelled in 2002, shortly before officials of that city's transport system decided to close the trolleybus system.

Production ended in 2010.

It was offered in two versions:

- ETB12 – a 12-metre (40 ft) two-axle trolleybus
- ETB18 – an 18-metre (60 ft) articulated bus

As of 2016, the total number in service was 180, specifically 95 ETB12 and 85 ETB18.
