= Trolleybuses in Ancona =

Public transit system in Marche, Italy

Ancona trolleybus system
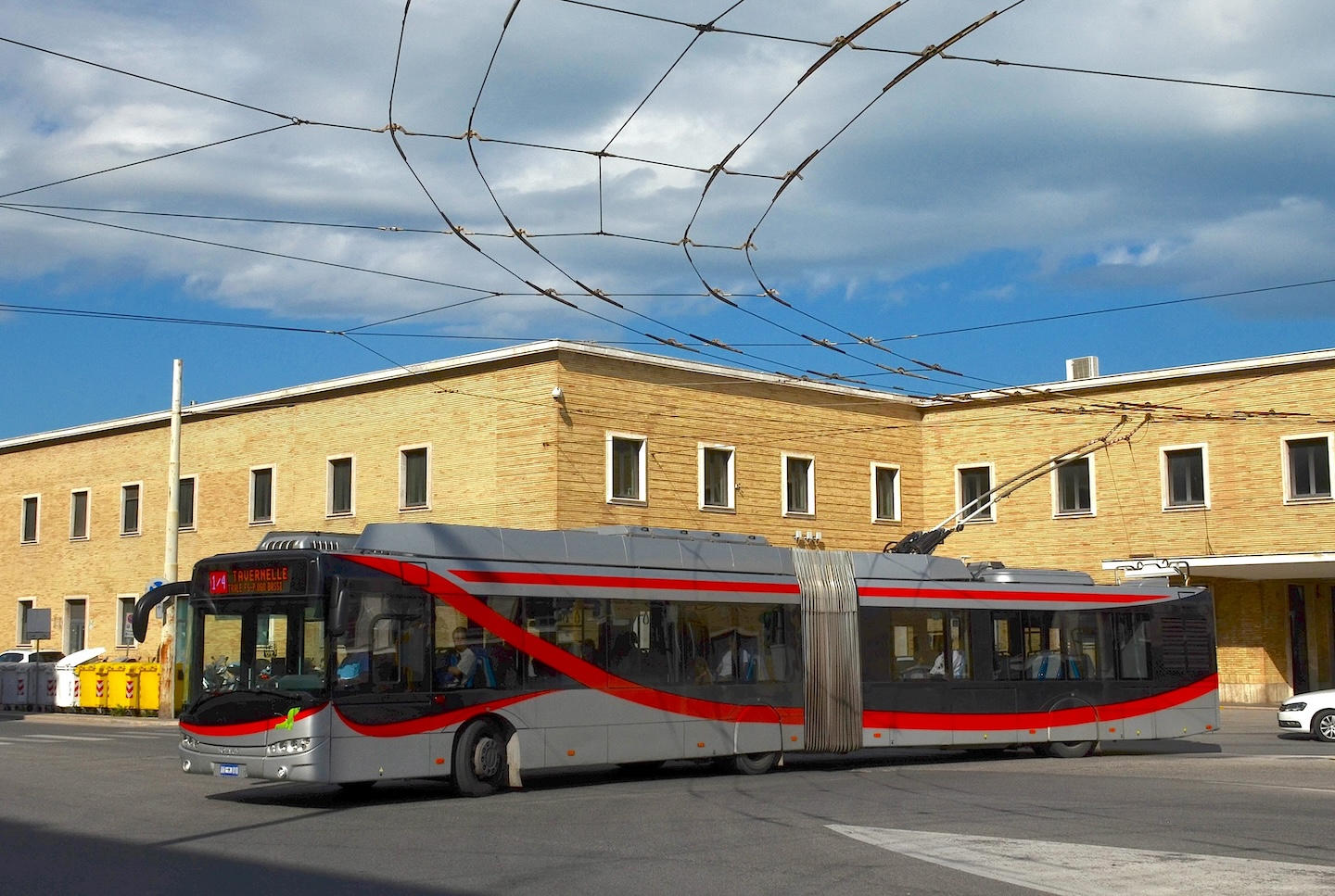
- One of Ancona's Solaris Trollino trolleybuses turning at Ancona railway station in 2024

Operation
- Locale: Ancona, Marche, Italy
- Open: 15 March 1949
- Status: Open
- Routes: 1
- Operator: Conerobus

Infrastructure
- Electrification: 750 V DC
- Stock: 9

Statistics
- Website: http://www.conerobus.it/ Conerobus (in Italian)

The Ancona trolleybus system (Italian: Rete filoviaria di Ancona) forms part of the public transport network of the city and comune of Ancona, in the Marche region, central Italy. In operation since 1949, the system presently comprises only one urban route.

== History ==
=== 1949–1989 ===
The Ancona trolleybus system opened on 15 March 1949, operated by the Azienda di Trasporti Municipalizzati Autofiloviari (ATMA). An interurban trolleybus line connecting Ancona with Falconara Marittima opened on 26 June of the same year. Operated by a separate company, Filovie Provinciale Ancona–Falconara, and considered a separate trolleybus system, the Ancona–Falconara system closed in 1972.

The urban system originally had the following five routes, and used 11.5 km (7.1 mi) of overhead wiring (9 km of which was "double-track", or two sets of wires, one for each direction, and 2.5 km of bidirectional single-track wiring):

- 1 Stazione FS – Piazza IV Novembre
- 2 Piazza Cavour – Pinocchio
- 3 Piazza Cavour – Posatora
- 4 Piazza Cavour – Tavernelle

All urban routes travelled via Stazione FS, and routes 2–4 served hilly neighbourhoods on their outer sections.

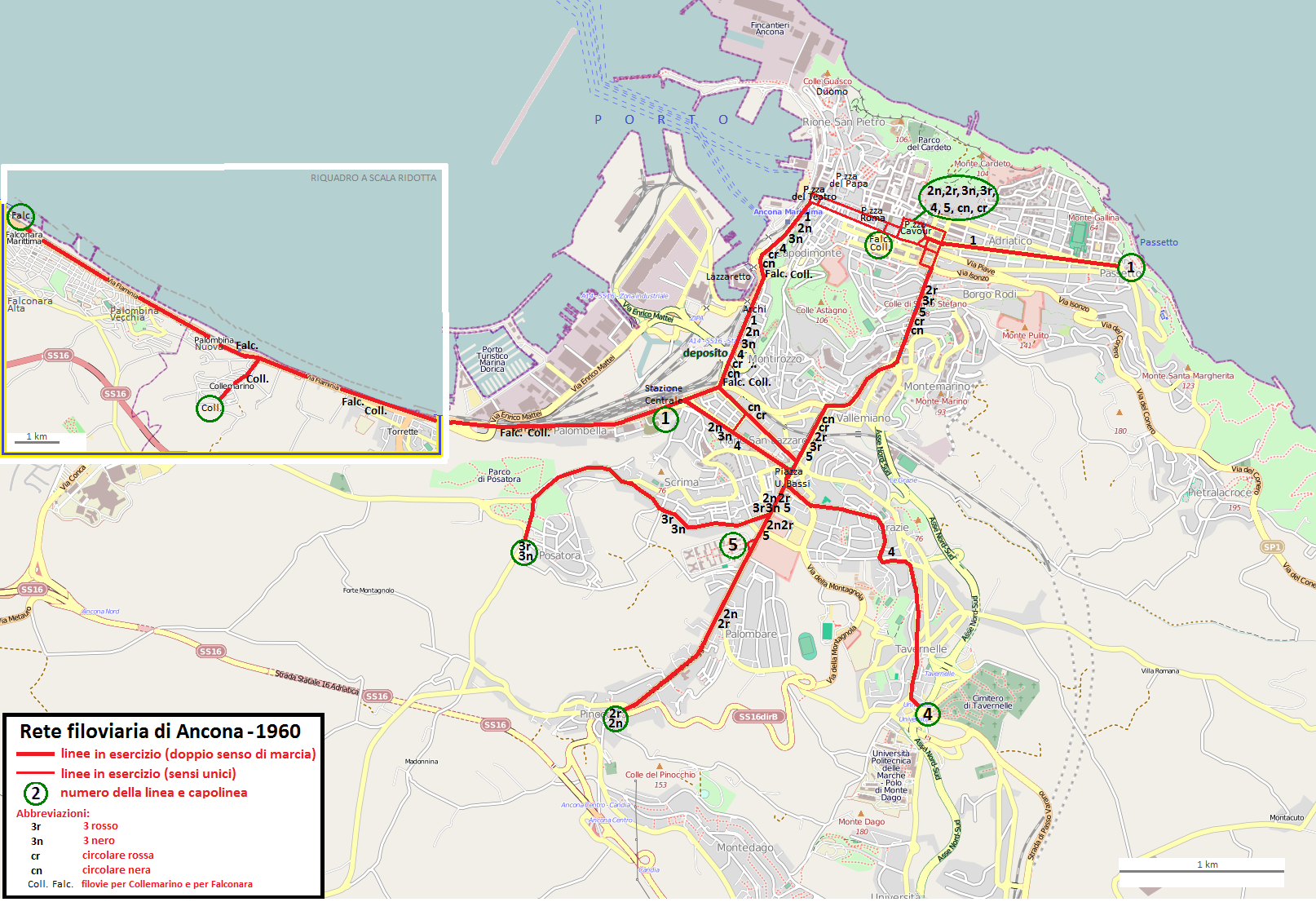
System map as of 1960, including the independently operated interuban route

A fifth route, 5 – Piazza Repubblica–Manicomio (a short-working of route 2), was added at the end of the 1950s. Trolleybus wiring was added through the Risorgimento Tunnel, after the tunnel's completion in December 1962, providing a more direct link between the city centre and Piazza Ugo Bassi. Route 3 closed (was converted to motorbuses) in July 1970, and all other urban routes except route 1 were closed later in the 1970s.

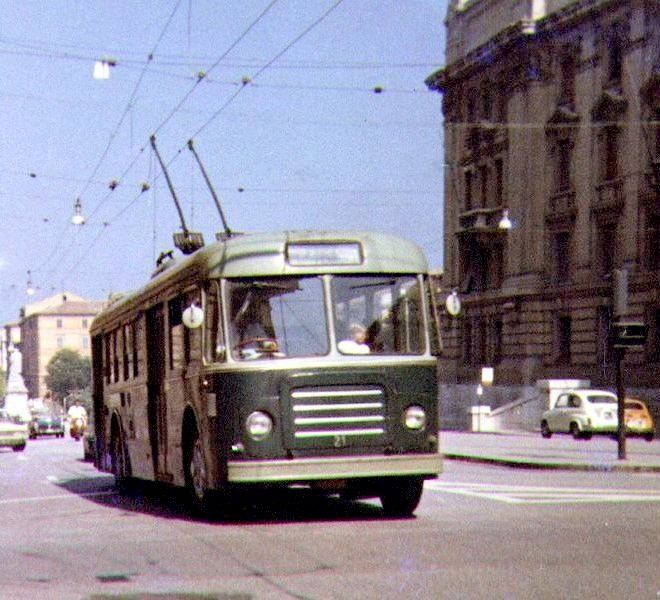
Fiat 2401 trolleybus no. 21 circa the 1960s

Trolleybuses originally wore a two-tone green livery (light green above the waist, dark green below), which was the standard livery for urban trams and trolleybuses throughout Italy during the 1930s and 1940s (and with two-tone blue for interurban systems, including Ancona–Falconara). In Ancona, this was replaced by a red-and-yellow livery in the mid-1970s. New Menarini-built trolleybuses delivered in 1983 introduced a new all-over orange livery; the red-and-yellow livery continued to be worn by the fleet's older trolleybuses, but ceased to be used upon their retirement from service, in 1987.

By 1982, use of trolleybuses on the surviving route had been restricted to mornings and early afternoons only, because of pedestrianisation of Corso Garibaldi at other times, and route 1 used motorbuses otherwise. In 1985, route 1 was extended from the railway station to Piazza Ugo Bassi, bringing back into use a section of wiring used by former routes 2–5.

=== 1990 to present ===
On 28 January 1998, ATMA was replaced as the system's operator by COTRAN (Consorzio Trasporti Pubblici della Provincia di Ancona), which had already been the operator of provincial bus services outside the city of Ancona. Only 17 months later, from 1 June 1999, COTRAN was reorganized and renamed Conerobus S.p.A., a joint-stock company that retained partial public ownership.

In 1998/99, the wires of former trolleybus route 4 between Piazza Ugo Bassi and Tavernelle, which had been out of use since at least 1974, were completely renewed, with plans to reintroduce trolleybuses to route 4. The new wiring was not tested by a trolleybus for the first time until February 2005, delayed by the need to refurbish or replace a substation.

Current system map (since 2006)

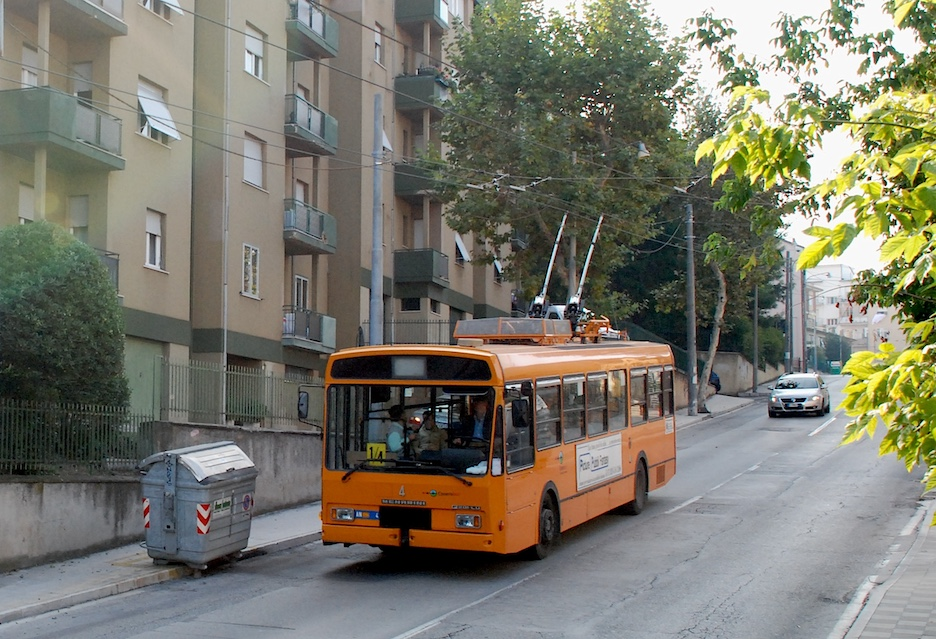
Menarini trolleybus 4 inbound from Tavernelle in 2007, less than one year after trolleybus service to that hilly district was restored after 32 years

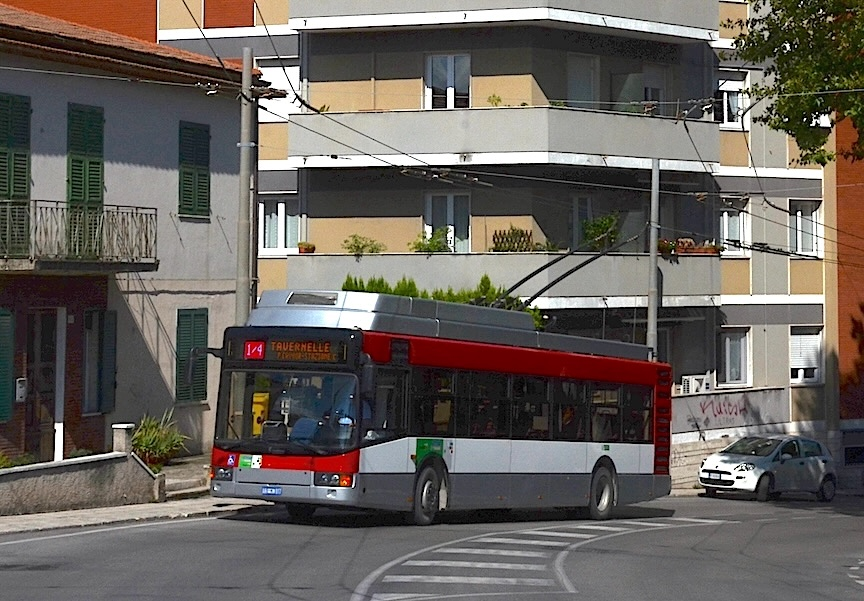
A Tavernelle-bound AnsaldoBreda trolleybus on Via Torresi in 2024

On 9 November 2006, routes 1 and 4 were combined at all times as route "1/4"—a combination that had already operated on Saturday afternoons and Sundays for many years, but was now expanded to seven days a week and with routes 1 and 4 discontinued. However, route 1 service had been temporarily motorbus-operated since May and this initially continued following its replacement by route 1/4. Starting on 18 December 2006, about half of the new route's runs became trolleybus-operated, and this date thereby brought the return of trolleybuses to the Tavernelle route after an absence of around 32 years, now as route 1/4. Trolleybus operation continued to be limited to the hours of 6:00 am to 1:20 pm, Mondays to Saturdays, but it was planned to alter the wires in the city centre to enable the afternoon-pedestrianised street to be bypassed and trolleybus service expanded to all-day. The expansion to all-day service was implemented on 17 September 2007, using a new, second set of wires along Corso Stamira for westbound travel, in place of Corso Garibaldi.

The voltage of the overhead wires was increased from 600 V to 750 V in 2012. The change had long been planned, and some or most of the vehicles had been modified to run on the higher voltage several years earlier, but modification of the substations was not completed until 2012.

The fleet was renewed in 2012–14. Two new Solaris Trollino trolleybuses – the system's first articulated trolleybuses – entered service on 18 February 2013, and the last example of the nine Menarini trolleybuses that had provided the service since the 1980s was withdrawn in March 2013. A third Trollino followed one year later. In December 2014, six new two-axle AnsaldoBreda trolleybuses began to enter service.

== Services ==
The route comprising the present Ancona trolleybus system is:

- 1/4 Piazza IV Novembre – Tavernelle

This is an amalgamation of the previous lines 1 and 4. The amalgamated line has the following itinerary, from Piazza IV Novembre: Viale della Vittoria, Piazza Cavour, Piazza Roma, Archi, Ancona railway station, Viale Giordano Bruno, Piazza Ugo Bassi, Via Torresi, Tavernelle (terminus).

== Fleet ==
=== Past fleet ===
The following now-retired trolleybuses have been used in Ancona (urban system):

- Fiat 668 F/110 (12 trolleybuses, Stanga bodies, nos. 1–12); served from 1949/50 to 1983.
- Fiat 668 F/110 (4 trolleybuses, Stanga bodies, nos. 13–16); served from 1952/53 to 1983.
- Fiat 2401 (5 trolleybuses, Cansa bodies, nos. 17–21); served from 1956/57 to 1987.
- Menarini F201/2LU (6 trolleybuses, nos. 1–6); entered service 1983; rebuilt 2001 with electrical equipment by Albiero & Bocca; the last two active units (1 and 3) were withdrawn on 31 December 2012.
- Menarini F201/2LU (3 trolleybuses, nos. 7–9); entered service 1987; rebuilt 2001 with electrical equipment by Albiero & Bocca; withdrawn 2013 (the last use of any in service occurred in mid-March 2013).

=== Current fleet ===
Ancona's present trolleybus fleet is made up of only the following two types:

- Solaris Trollino (3 trolleybuses, nos. 010–012); first two entered service in 2013, the third in January 2014.
- AnsaldoBreda F22 (6 trolleybuses, nos. 013–018); entered service in December 2014. These were built in 2001–02 for the Nancy (France) trolleybus system but never used there, and were acquired secondhand by Ancona in late 2011 or 2012 but not delivered (after refurbishment and repainting in Ancona livery) until 2014.

== See also ==
- List of trolleybus systems in Italy
