= Louis Lombard-Gérin =

French engineer

Louis Lombard-Gérin (4 June 1848, Lyon - 4 November 1918, Lyon) was a French engineer involved in pioneering the trolley bus.

Born Louis Lombard, he married Emma Gérin on 24 August 1874. They had seven sons together. He originally worked as a construction engineer specialising in carpentry and iron constructions.

== Electrobus ==
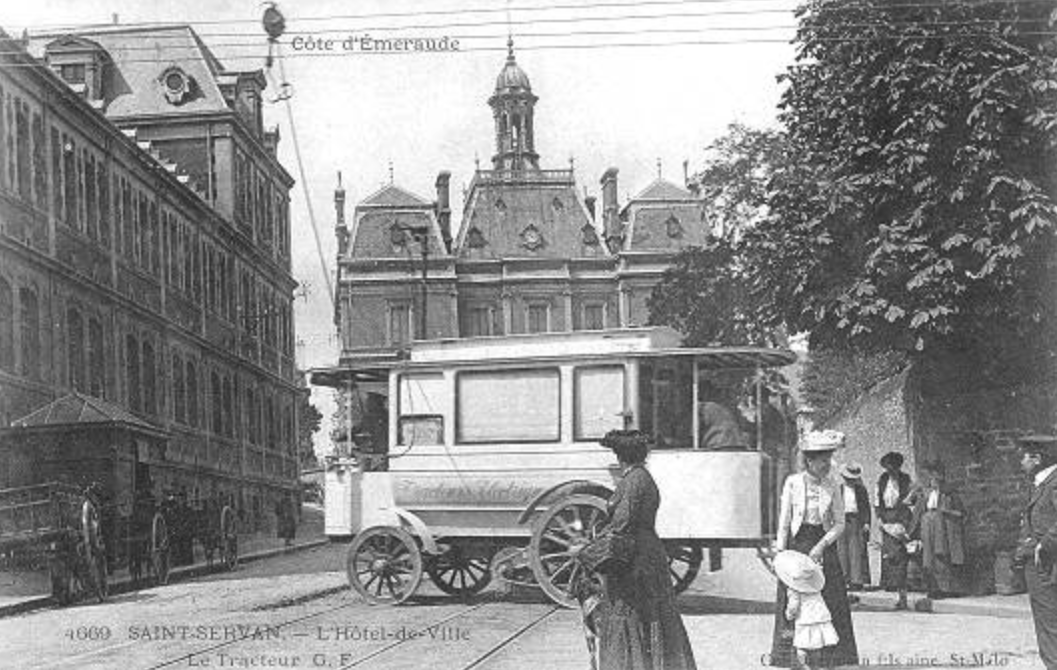
Electrobus in Saint Servan

Lombard-Gérin designed the Electrobus which was put into production by the Compagnie de Traction par Trolley Automoteur. It was showcased at the Exposition Universelle in 1900. The electrobus incorporated what was known as the Lombard-Gérin system.

An electrically powered pantograph trolley drove synchronously on the overhead contact line in front of the trolley, relieving the ten-meter-long transmission cable - unlike the previously known trailing cables - from the mechanical pull. The contact car itself weighed 18 kilograms and was operated with three-phase current. It did not get its drive energy directly from contact with the contact line, but from electromagnetic induction from drive motors of the car. This required six or seven lines of connecting cable. The three-phase current required for the contact carriage was generated from the alternating current circuit of one of the series motors and was therefore dependent on the driving speed. In addition, the trolley had its own brake, which was operated via a contact on the drive switch, so that synchronous operation was also possible on inclines or slopes. In the Lombard-Gérin system, the distance between the two catenary wires was 30 centimeters; the overhead contact line was suspended from seven-meter-high masts. The two wires made of hard-drawn copper were each 8.25 millimeters in diameter.
