= Trolleybuses in Limoges =

Limoges public transport

Limoges trolleybus system
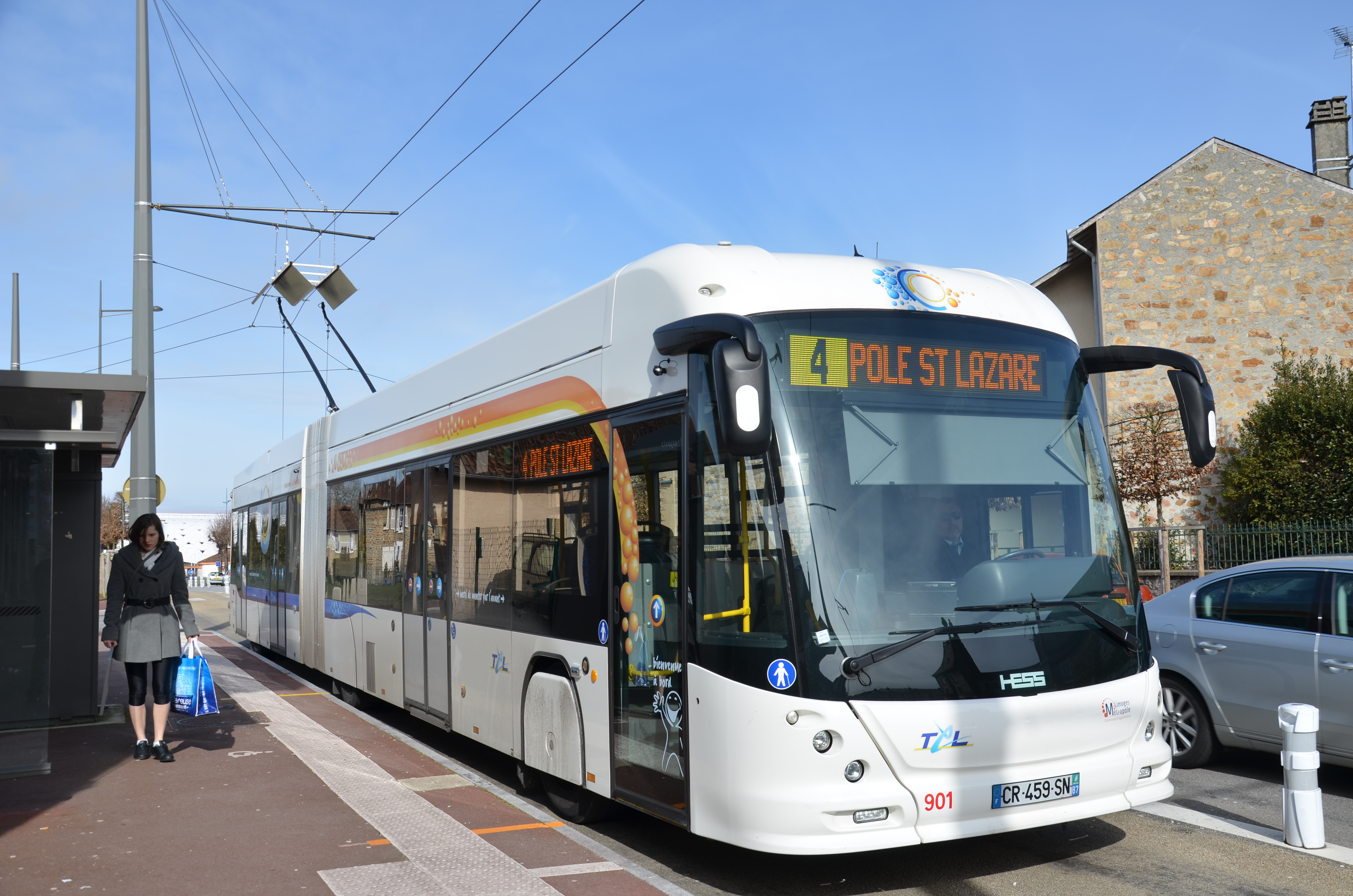
- A Hess Swisstrolley 4 trolleybus at the line 4 terminus at Montjovis, 2015.

Operation
- Locale: Limoges, Limousin, France

Statistics
Trolleybus era: since 1943
- Status: Open
- Routes: 5
- Operator: STCL
- Electrification: 600 Volts DC
- Route length: 32.5 km (20.2 mi)
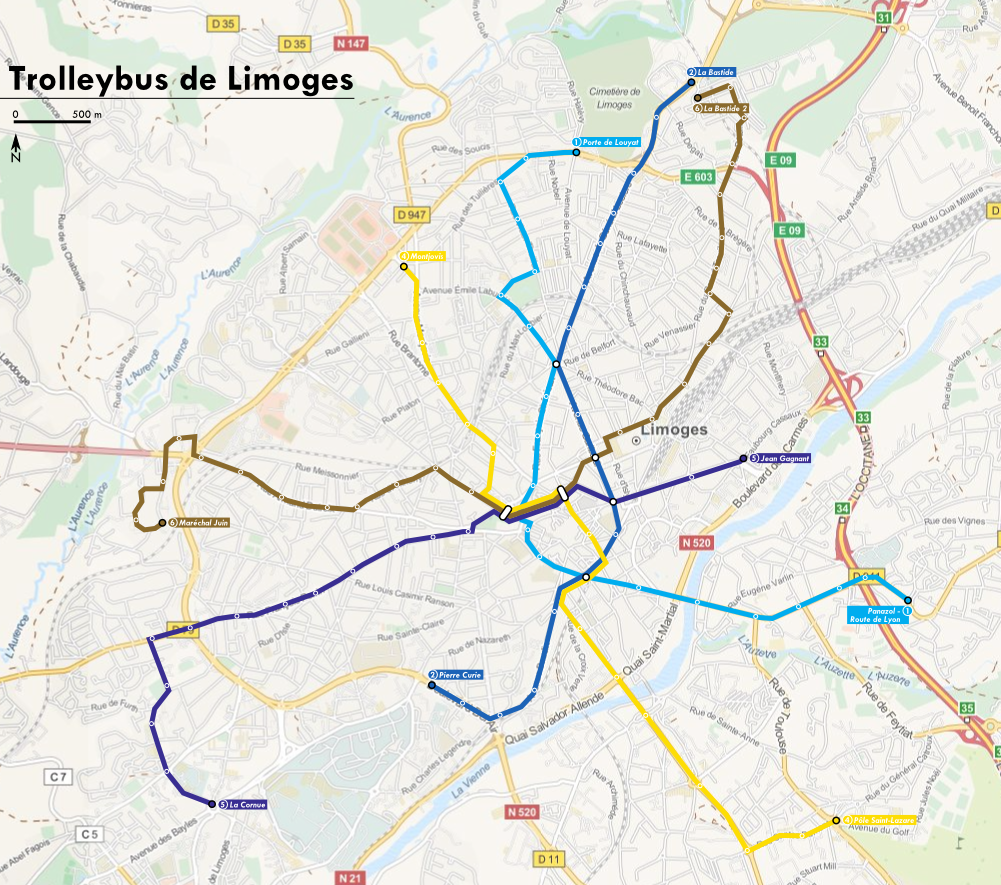
- Website: https://www.stcl.fr/ STCL (in French)

The Limoges trolleybus system (French: Réseau de trolleybus de Limoges) forms part of the public transport network of the city and commune of Limoges, in the Limousin region of the Great South West of France.

In operation since 1943, the system presently comprises five urban routes. Trolleybuses are popular in Limoges for their silent operation, their lack of pollution and their performance in the steep streets.

== History ==
Trolleybuses made their first appearance in Limoges in July 1943. They were intended to replace the urban tramway, which was ageing and in poor condition.

The first trolleybus line was no. 2, connecting Place Carnot with Avenue Baudin. Services on this line were operated initially by Vétra CB60 vehicles. The following October, it was the turn of line 3 to be converted to trolleybus operation, again with CB60s. Line 3 was merged directly with line 2.

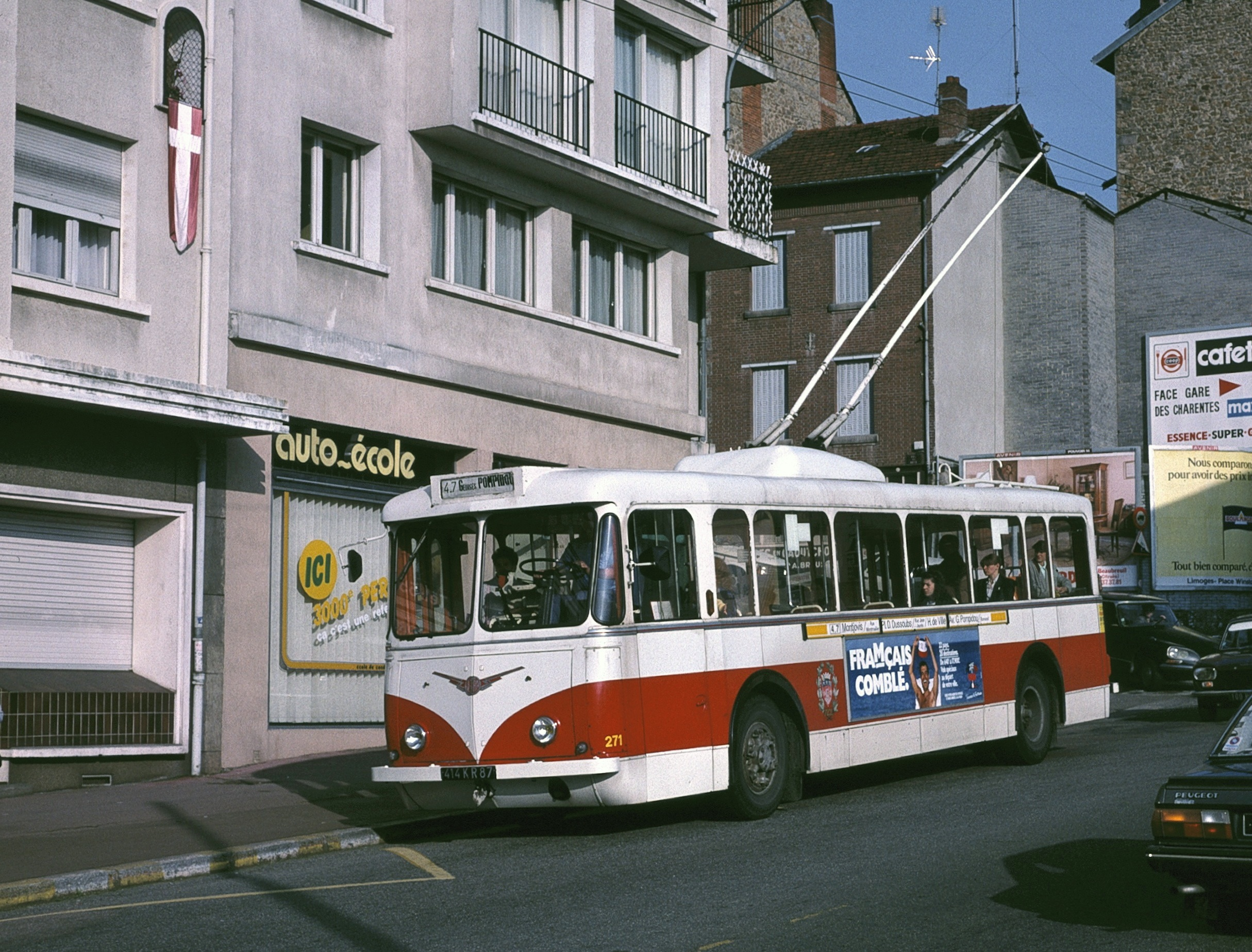
A Vétra trolleybus in Limoges, 1988.

In November 1945, line 6 had its trams replaced by trolleybuses, and on 4 October 1948 line 4 became a trolleybus line.

With the replacement of trams by trolleybuses on lines 5 and 1 in March and July 1951, operations on Limoges' urban tramway were finally terminated.

Since then, the city has always been faithful to its electric transport system, and its lines have been expanded over time.

In May 1953, the opening of a sixth line, no. 9, expanded the Limoges trolleybus system to a route length of 26 km (16 mi). In 1954, the Compagnie des Tramways Electriques de Limoges (CTEL) became the Compagnie des Trolleybus de Limoges (CTL). Further extensions in 1963 and 1965 left the system at its current route length of 32 km (20 mi).

== Services ==
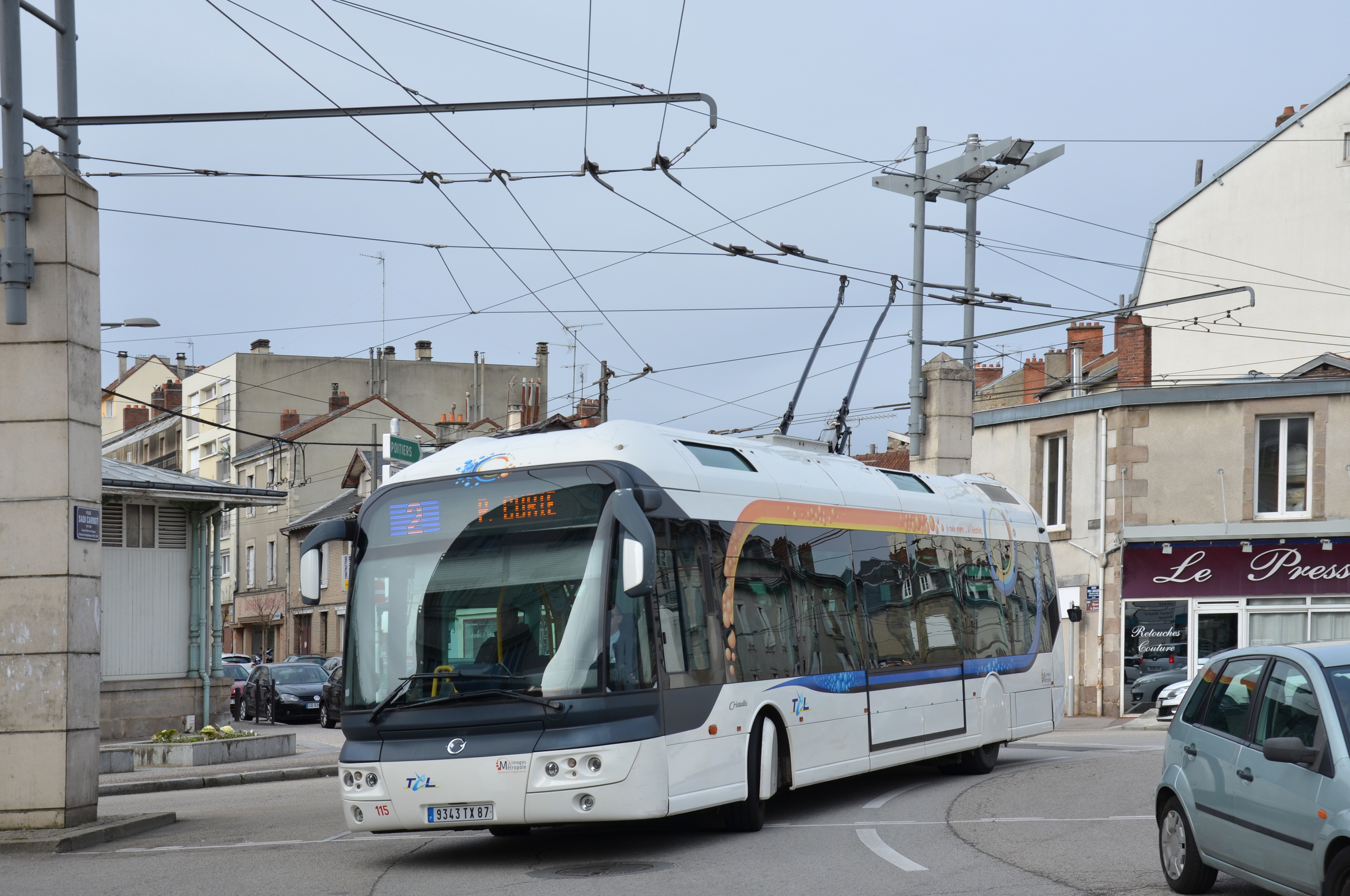
A Cristalis ETB 12 trolleybus at the line 2 at Place Carnot, 2015.

The current Limoges trolleybus lines are:

- 1 : Route de Lyon - Porte de Louyat, by Cristalis trolleybus;
- 2 : Pierre Curie - La Bastide, by Cristalis trolleybus;
- 4 : Montjovis - Pôle Saint Lazare (served by articulated trolleybuses);
- 5 : Jean Gagnant - Les Courrières/La Cornue (extended in 2001 to Plaisance/Roussillon, in 2004 to La Cornue and in 2009 to Les Courrières);
- 6 : La Bastide 2 - Maréchal Juin (re-electrified and lengthened at both ends in 1996).

The 1.5 km (0.93 mi) extension of the southern part of line 4 to serve Pôle Saint Lazare and the new clinic entered service on Monday, 6 July 2009.

The five trolleybus lines in Limoges now represent about 53% of passengers carried, and one third of the mileage on the city's overall bus network.

== Fleet ==
=== Current fleet ===
As of March 2026, the Limoges trolleybus fleet consisted of the following types:

- Irisbus Cristalis Neo 18 - 7 trolleybuses (nos. 911-917), entered in service between 2019 and 2023;
- Irisbus Cristalis ETB12 - 27 trolleybuses (nos. 101-127), entered in service between 2006 and 2011;
- Hess SwissTrolley 4 (BGT-2ND) - 3 trolleybuses (nos. 902-904), entered in service in 2013.

=== Past fleet ===
- Renault ER100H - 40 trolleybuses (nos. 401-440). Trolleybus 440 remains now like museum vehicle..

== Depots ==
to go here-->

== See also ==
- Limoges-Bénédictins station
- List of trolleybus systems in France
