= Trolleybuses in Lyon =

Public transport system in Lyon, France

Coordinates: 45°45′38″N 04°51′34″E

Lyon trolleybus system
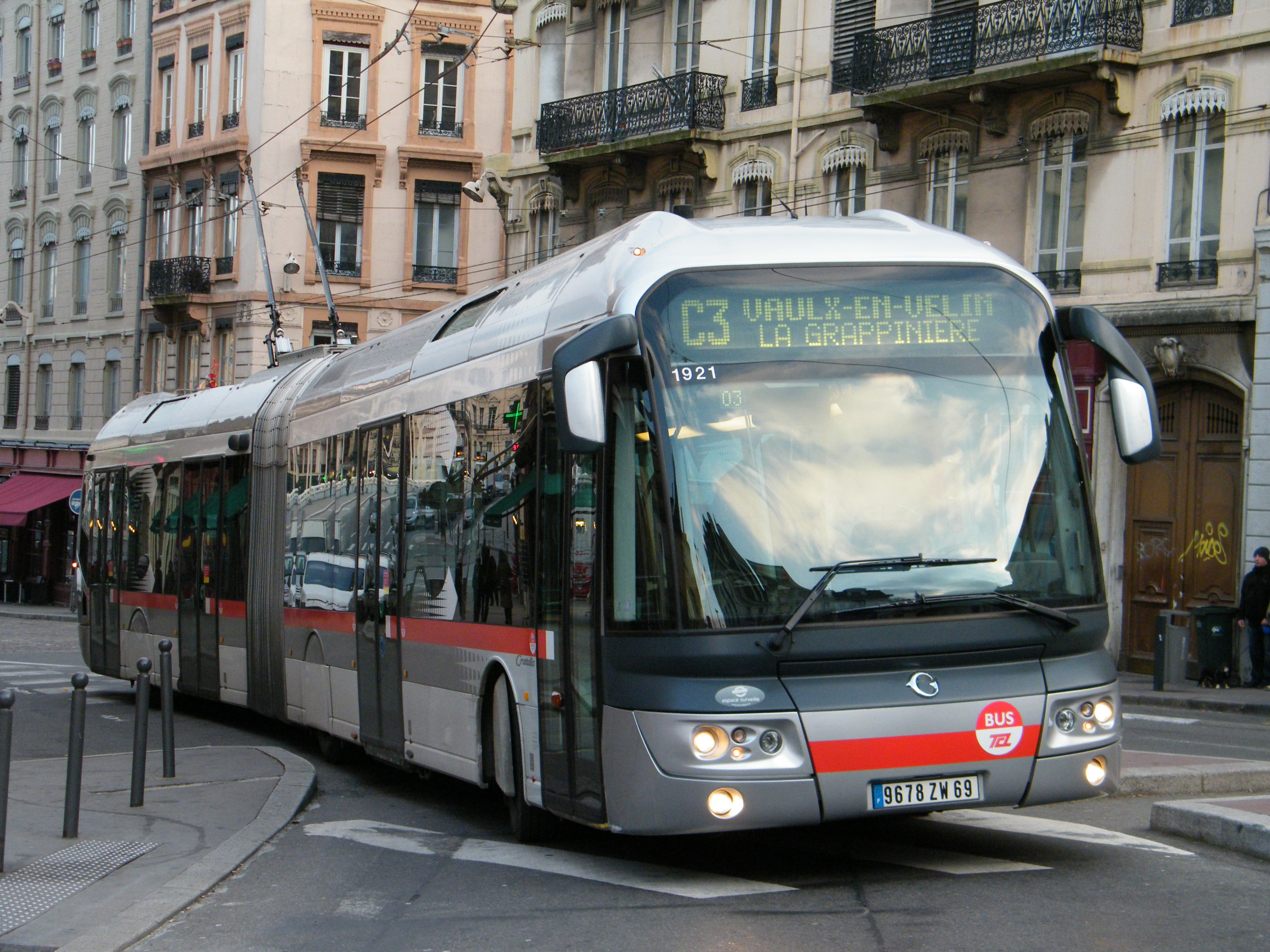
- An Irisbus Cristalis in Lyon, 2009.

Operation
- Locale: Lyon, France
- Open: 15 October 1935
- Status: Open
- Routes: 8 (+ 1)
- Owner: SYTRAL
- Operator: Keolis

Infrastructure
- Stock: 131

Statistics
- Website: http://www.tcl.fr TCL (in French and English)

The Lyon trolleybus system (French: Réseau de trolleybus de Lyon) is part of the public transport network of the city and commune of Lyon, France. Opened in 1935, it combines with the Lyon Metro, the Lyon tramway network and Lyon's urban motorbus network to form an integrated system.

Lyon was one of the first cities in France to utilize trolleybuses. It is the capitale du trolleybus français ("capital of the French trolleybus"). In 1961, the Lyon trolleybus system had the largest number of trolleybuses ever to operate simultaneously in France (370 vehicles). In the 21st century, it has been a leader in the development of new trolley buses.

The system is owned by SYTRAL, and, like most of the rest of the four managed transportation systems, is operated by Keolis on behalf of Transports en commun lyonnais (TCL). Since 2006, it has been expanded by the electrification of two major new lines (C1 and C2). As of 2015, the system consisted of nine lines.

== Lines ==
The Lyon trolleybus system is presently made up of the following lines:

Line		Route	Depot	Sat	Sun/Hols
C1	Disabled access	Gare Part Dieu-Vivier Merle <> Cuire	UTN	yes	yes
C2	Disabled access	Gare Part Dieu-Vivier Merle <> Rillieux-Semailles	UTN	yes	yes
C3	Disabled access	Gare St Paul <> Vaulx en Velin-La Grappinière	UTS	yes	yes
C4	Disabled access	Jean Macé <> Cité Internationale-Centre de Congrès	UTS	yes	yes
C11	Disabled access	Saxe-Gambetta <> Laurent Bonnevay-Astroballe	UTS	yes	yes
C13	Disabled access	Grange Blanche <> Montessuy-Gutenberg	UTC	yes	yes
C14	Disabled access	Jean Macé <> Les Sources	UTV	yes	yes
C18	Disabled access	Hôtel de Ville-Louis Pradel <> Croix Rousse-Nord	UTC	yes	yes
S6	Disabled access	Hôtel de Ville-Louis Pradel <> Croix-Rousse	UTC	no	no

All of these lines, except line S6, offer a high level of service, and operate 7 days a week from 5 am to midnight, with frequent services on weekdays from 7.00 am to 8.00 pm (usually every 8 to 10 minutes, at most every 12 minutes). They provide an attractive and permanent service throughout the year, including during school holiday periods.

Lines C1 to C3 are equipped with a signal priority system, dedicated lanes for almost their entire routes, and high-capacity bus shelters fitted with ticket distributors.

The principle of these three lines dates back to 2006, and the creation of lignes fortes Cristalis ("Cristalis strong lines"), designated by the letter C. Cristalis was a model of trolleybus built by Irisbus. The principle was extended on 29 August 2011 to 23 other lines, some operated by trolleybuses, and the rest by motorbuses. The letter "C" has been retained a designator of these lines, but no longer has any other meaning.

== Fleet ==
As of 2024, the Lyon trolleybus fleet stood at 154 vehicles, of which 66 were rigid buses and 88 articulated buses:

Fleet nos.	Qty	Manufacturer	Electrics	Model	Type	Built	Line(s)
1711 to 1717	6	MAN/Hess	Kiepe	NMT 222	Rigid	1999	--
1803 to 1869	60	Irisbus	Alstom	Cristalis 12	Rigid	2000–2004	C4, C11, C14, and C18
1901 to 1927; 2901 to 2917	43	Irisbus	Alstom	Cristalis 18	Articulated	2001–2006	C1, C2 and C3
2918 to 2928	11	Irisbus	Alstom	Cristalis 18	Articulated	2010	C1, C2 and C4
2001 to 2034	34	Hess			Articulated	2021	C13

== See also ==
- List of trolleybus systems in France
