= Trolleybus =

Electric bus taking power from overhead wires

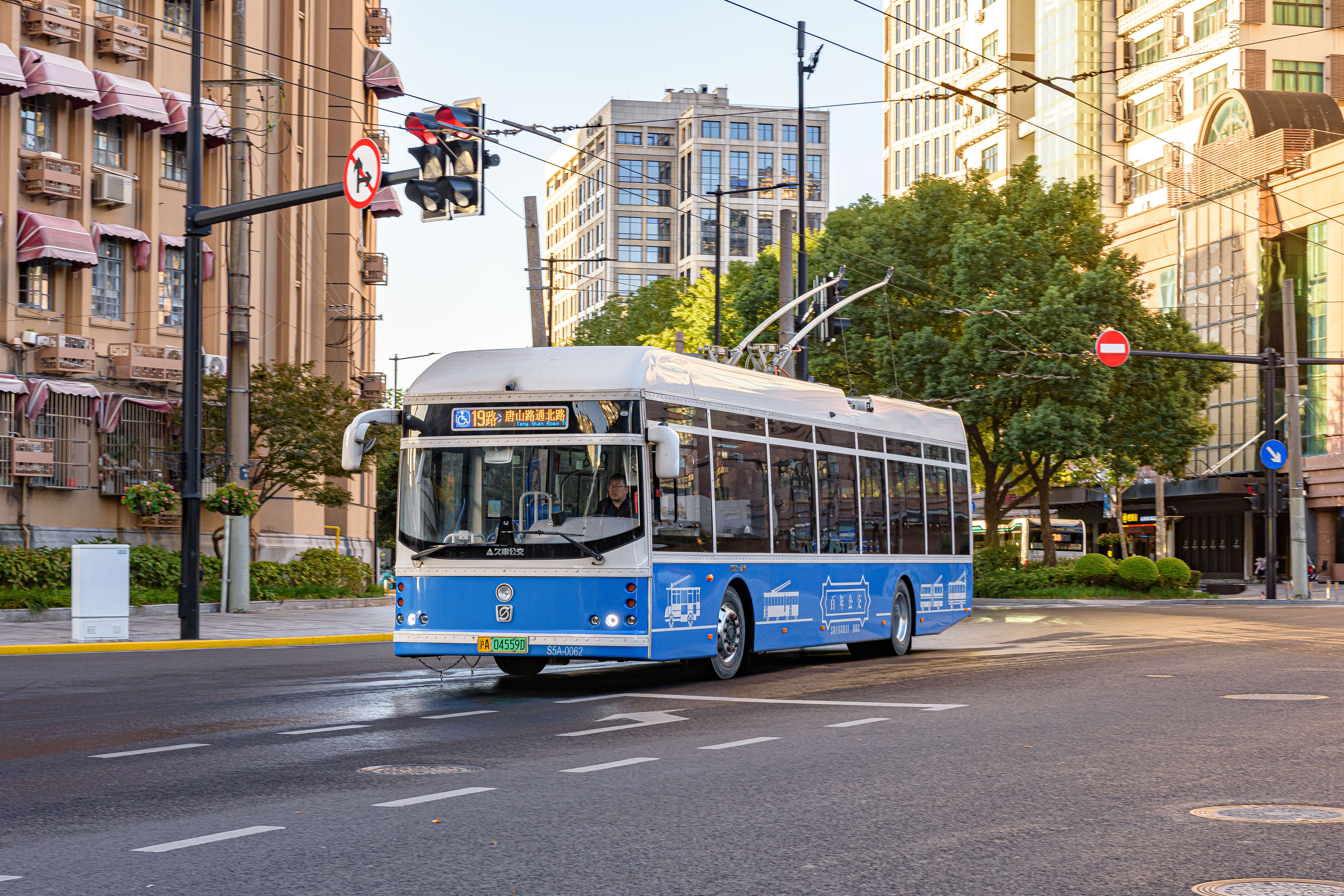
A Sunwin trolleybus in Shanghai, on the world's oldest operating trolleybus system

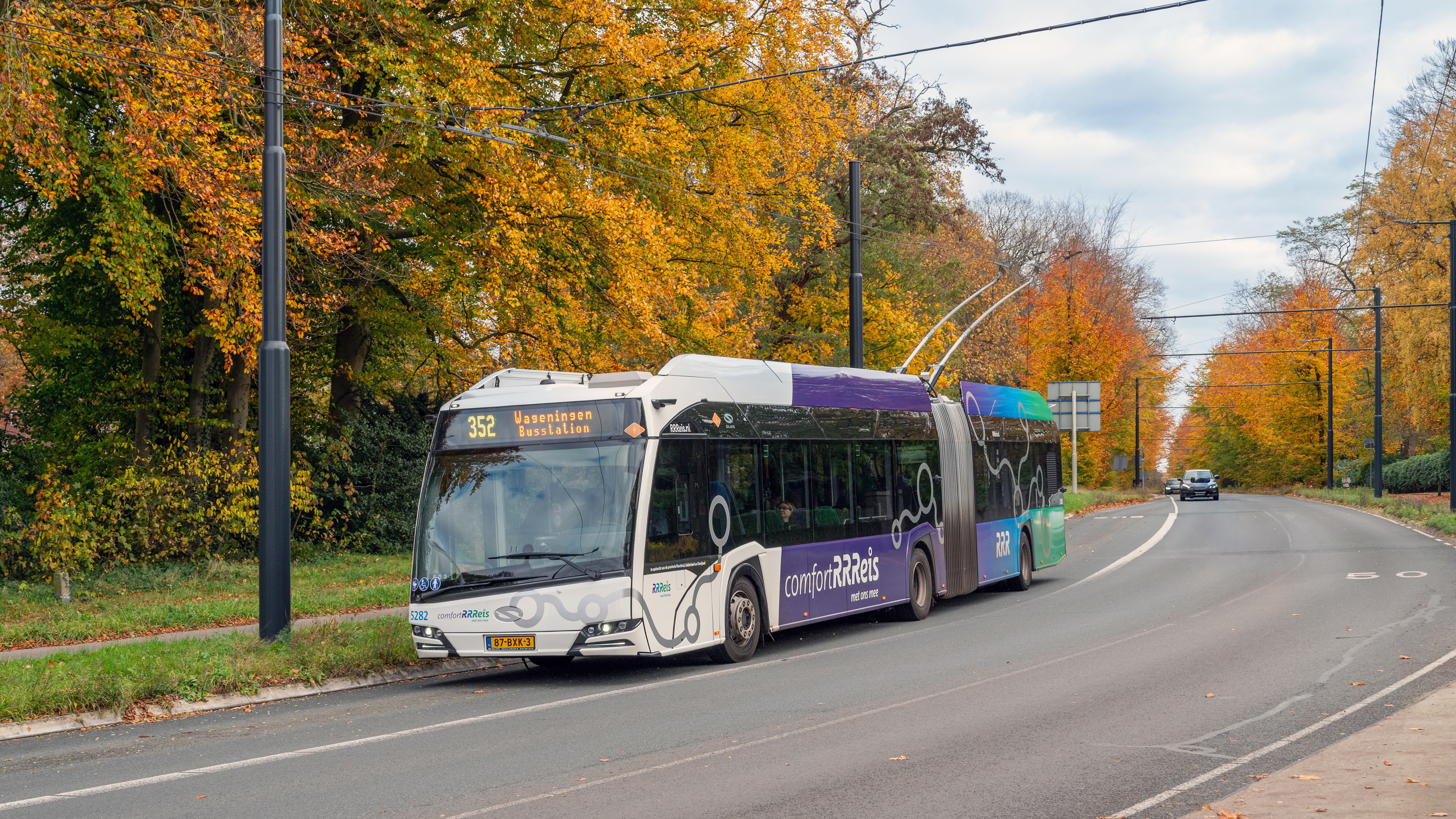
Solaris trolleybus on the Arnhem trolleybus system in the Netherlands

Video of a trolleybus in Ghent, Belgium

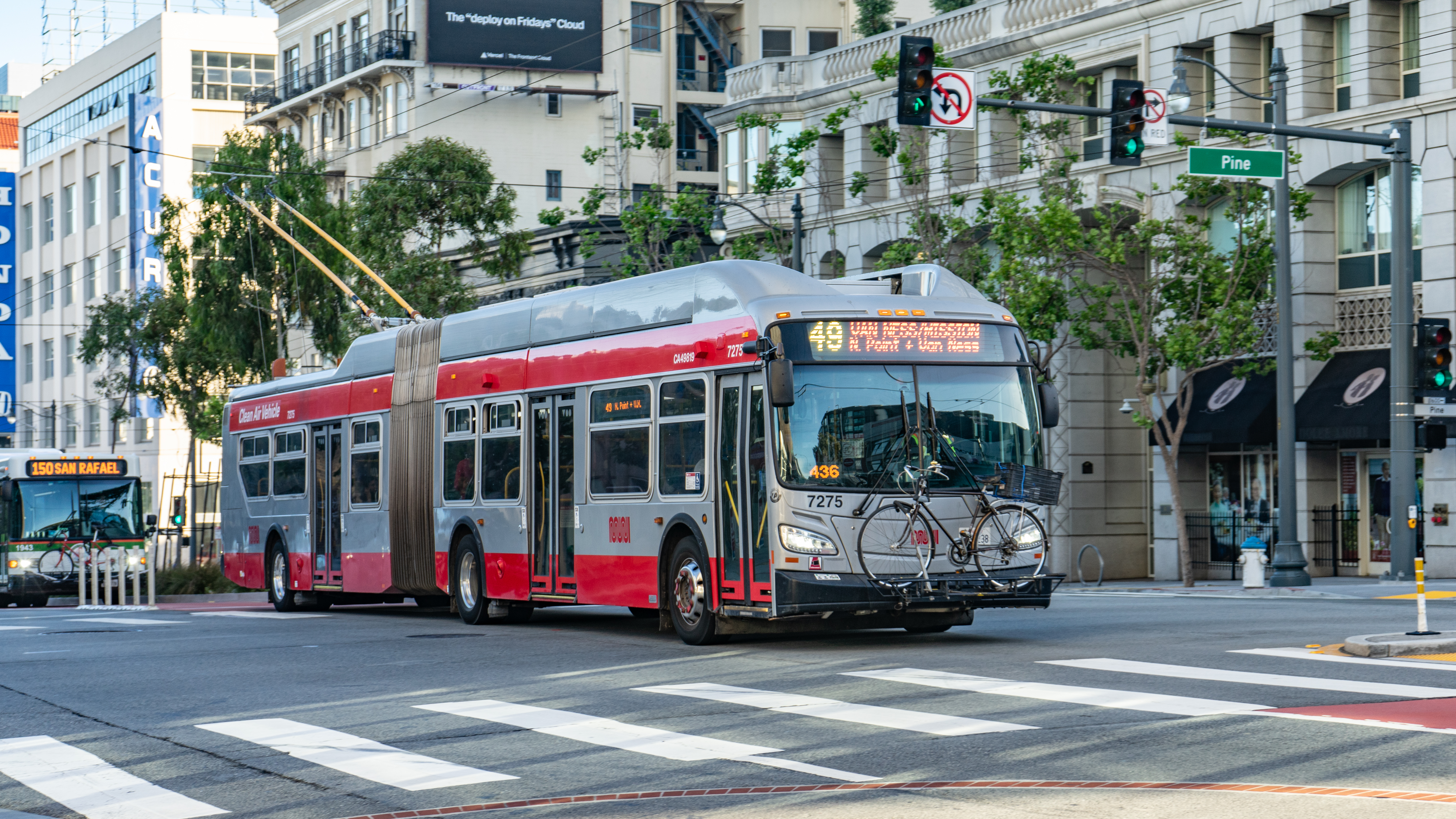
New Flyer trolleybus in San Francisco

A trolleybus (also known as trolley bus, trolley coach, trackless trolley, trackless tram (in the 1910s and 1920s), road tram or simply trolley) is an electric bus that draws power from dual overhead lines (generally suspended from roadside posts) using spring-loaded or pneumatically raised trolley poles. Two wires, and two trolley poles, are required to complete the electrical circuit. This differs from a tram or streetcar, which normally uses the track as the return path, needing only one wire and one pole (or pantograph). They are also distinct from other kinds of electric buses, which usually rely on batteries. Power is most commonly supplied as 600-volt direct current in older systems and 750-volts in newer systems, but there are exceptions.

Currently, around 260 trolleybus systems are in operation, in cities and towns in more than 40 countries. Altogether, more than 800 trolleybus systems have existed, but not more than about 400 concurrently.

== History ==
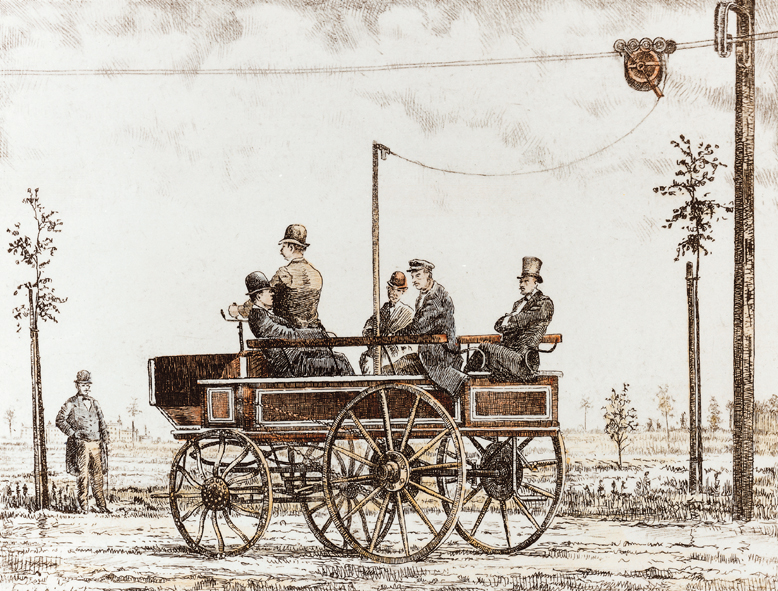
The Elektromote, the world's first trolleybus, in Berlin, Germany, 1882

The trolleybus dates back to 29 April 1882, when Dr. Ernst Werner Siemens demonstrated his "Elektromote" in a Berlin suburb. This experiment continued until 13 June 1882, after which there were few developments in Europe, although separate experiments were conducted in the United States. In 1899, another vehicle which could run either on or off rails was demonstrated in Berlin. The next development was when Louis Lombard-Gérin operated an experimental line at the Paris Exhibition of 1900 after four years of trials, with a circular route around Lake Daumesnil that carried passengers. Routes followed in six places including Eberswalde and Fontainebleau. Max Schiemann on 10 July 1901 opened the world's fourth passenger-carrying trolleybus system, which operated at Bielatal (Biela Valley, near Dresden), Germany. Schiemann built and operated the Bielatal system, and is credited with developing the under-running trolley current collection system, with two horizontally parallel overhead wires and rigid trolleypoles spring-loaded to hold them up to the wires. Although this system operated only until 1904, Schiemann had developed what is now the standard trolleybus current collection system. In the early days there were many other methods of current collection. The Cédès-Stoll (Mercédès-Électrique-Stoll) system was first operated near Dresden between 1902 and 1904, and 18 systems followed. The Lloyd-Köhler or Bremen system was tried out in Bremen with 5 further installations, and the Cantono-Frigerio system was used in Italy.

Throughout this period, trackless freight systems and electric canal boats were also built.

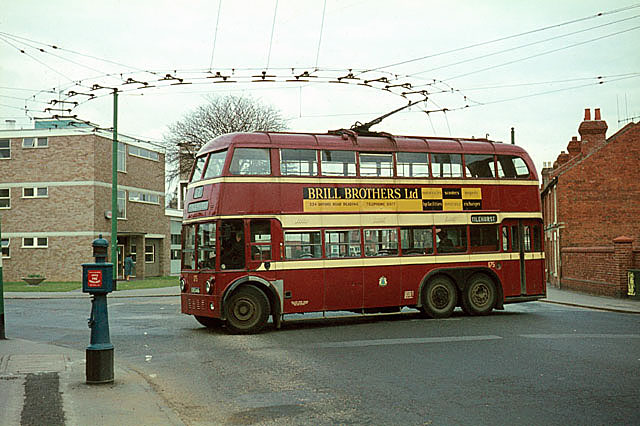
A double-deck trolleybus in Reading, England, 1966

Leeds and Bradford became the first cities to put trolleybuses into service in Great Britain, on 20 June 1911. Supposedly, though it was opened on 20 June, the public was not admitted to the Bradford route until the 24th. Bradford was also the last city to operate trolleybuses in the UK; the system closed on 26 March 1972. The last rear-entrance trolleybus in service in Britain was also in Bradford and is now owned by the Bradford Trolleybus Association. Birmingham was the first UK city to replace a tram route with trolleybuses, while Wolverhampton, under the direction of Charles Owen Silvers, became world-famous for its trolleybus designs. There were 50 trolleybus systems in the UK, London's being the largest. By the time trolleybuses arrived in Britain in 1911, the Schiemann system was well established and was the most common, although the Cédès-Stoll (Mercédès-Électrique-Stoll) system was tried in West Ham (in 1912) and in Keighley (in 1913).

Smaller trackless trolley systems were built in the US early as well. The first non-experimental system was a seasonal municipal line installed near Nantasket Beach in 1904; the first year-round commercial line was built to open a hilly property to development just outside Los Angeles in 1910. The trackless trolley was often seen as an interim step, leading to streetcars. In the US, some systems subscribed to the all-four concept of using buses, trolleybuses, streetcars (trams, trolleys), and rapid transit subway and/or elevated lines (metros), as appropriate, for routes ranging from the lightly used to the heaviest trunk line. Buses and trolleybuses in particular were seen as entry systems that could later be upgraded to rail as appropriate. In a similar fashion, many cities in Britain originally viewed trolleybus routes as extensions to tram (streetcar) routes where the cost of constructing or restoring track could not be justified at the time, though this attitude changed markedly (to viewing them as outright replacements for tram routes) in the years after 1918. Trackless trolleys were the dominant form of new post-World War I electric traction, with extensive systems in among others, Los Angeles, Chicago, Boston, Rhode Island, and Atlanta; San Francisco and Philadelphia still maintain an "all-four" fleet. Some trolleybus lines in the United States (and in Britain, as noted above) came into existence when a trolley or tram route did not have sufficient ridership to warrant track maintenance or reconstruction. In a similar manner, a proposed tram scheme in Leeds, United Kingdom, was changed to a trolleybus scheme to cut costs.

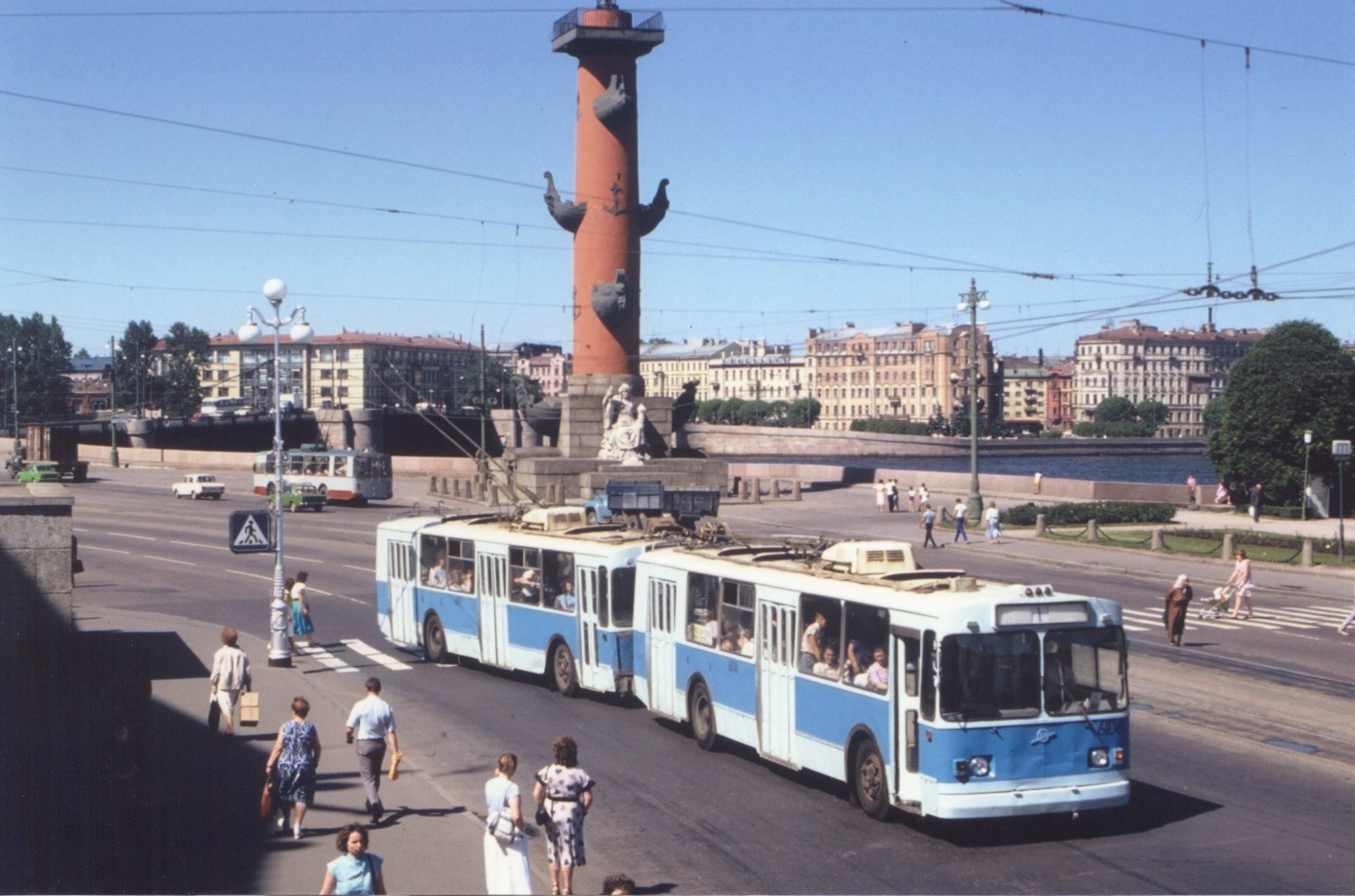
MU ZiU-9 in Leningrad, Soviet Union, 1987

Trolleybuses are uncommon today in North America, but their use is widespread in Europe, Asia, South America and in countries which were part of the Soviet Union. Generally trolleybuses occupy a position in usage between street railways (trams) and motorbuses. Worldwide, around 300 cities or metropolitan areas on 5 continents are served by trolleybuses (further detail under Use and preservation, below).

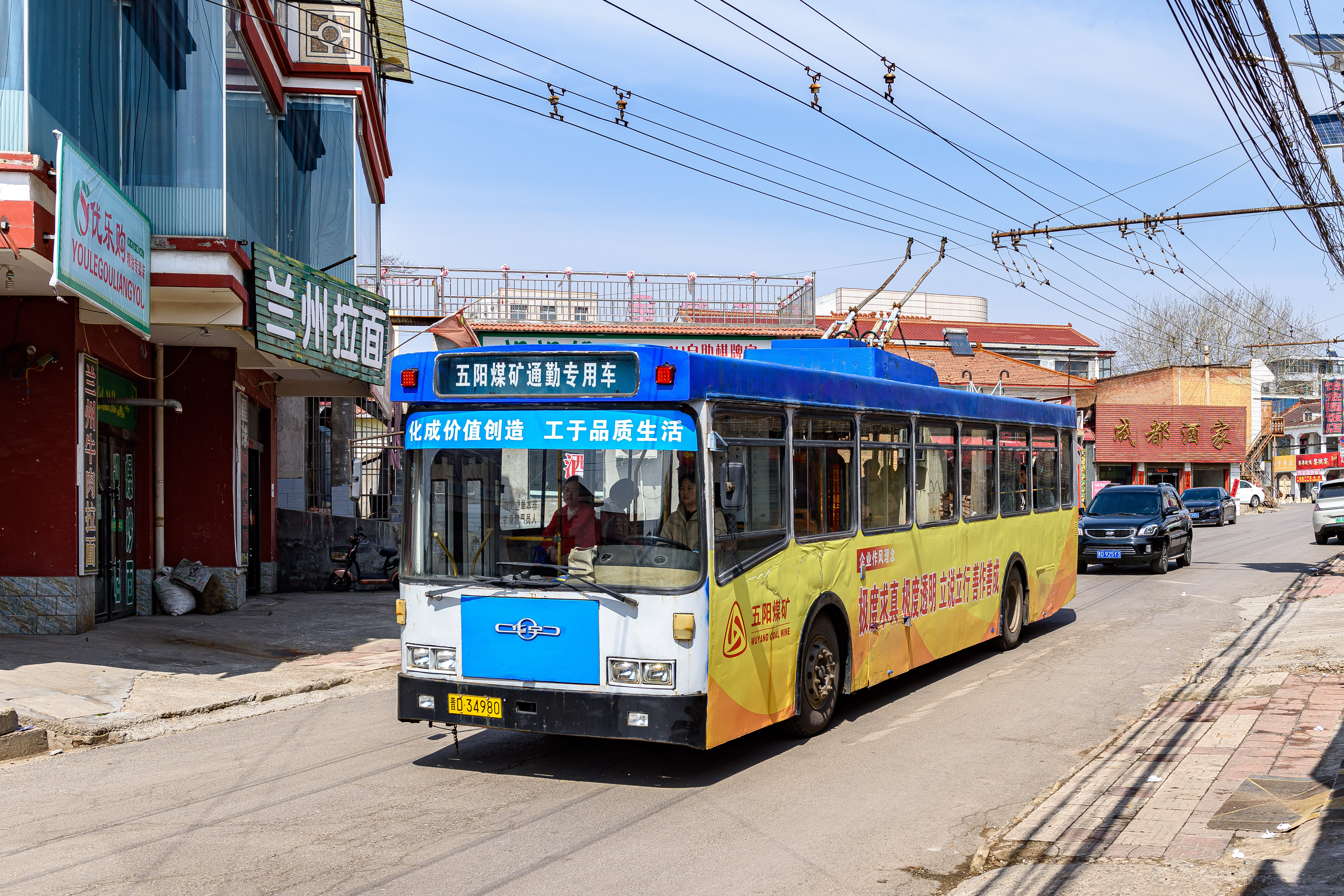
Coal mines also operate trolleybus networks to serve workers. Wuyang Coal Mine in Xiangyuan, Changzhi, Shanxi has the last remaining mine trolleybus system in China.

This mode of transport operates in large cities, such as Belgrade, Lyon, Pyongyang, São Paulo, Seattle, Sofia, St. Petersburg, and Zurich, as well as in smaller ones such as Dayton, Gdynia, Lausanne, Limoges, Modena, and Salzburg. As of 2020, Kyiv has the largest trolleybus system in the world in terms of route length, while Minsk, has the largest system in terms of number of routes. Sweden's Landskrona has the smallest system in terms of route length, while Czech Republic's Mariánské Lázně is the smallest city to be served by trolleybuses. Opened in 1914, the Shanghai trolleybus system is the oldest currently operating system in the world. With a length of 86 km, route #52 of Crimean Trolleybus is the longest trolleybus line in the world. See also Trolleybus usage by country.

Transit authorities in some cities have reduced or discontinued the use of trolleybuses, while others, wanting to add or expand use of zero-emission vehicles in an urban environment, have opened new systems or are planning new systems. For example, new systems opened in Lecce, Italy, in 2012; in Malatya, Turkey, in 2015; and in Marrakesh in 2017. Beijing and Shanghai have been expanding their respective systems, with Beijing growing to a 31-line system operated with a fleet of over 1,250 trolleybuses. In North Korea, the newest city to have a network is Manpo in December 2019. Since the year 2022, the city of Prague is constructing a new trolleybus system. Meanwhile, in 2023, plans for a trolleybus line in Berlin were scrapped in favour of a solution with battery-powered vehicles (motorbus).

== Vehicle design ==
Diagram of a 1947-built Pullman Standard model 800 trolleybus, a type that operated in Valparaíso (Chile) until 2023

1. Parallel overhead lines (overhead wires)
2. Destination or route sign
3. Rear view mirror
4. Headlights
5. Boarding (entry) doors
6. Direction (turning) wheels
7. Exit doors
8. Traction wheels
9. Decorative elements
10. Retractors/retrievers
11. Pole rope
12. Contact shoes
13. Trolley poles (power collector)
14. Pole storage hooks
15. Trolley pole base and fairing/shroud
16. Bus number

Modern-design trolleybuses

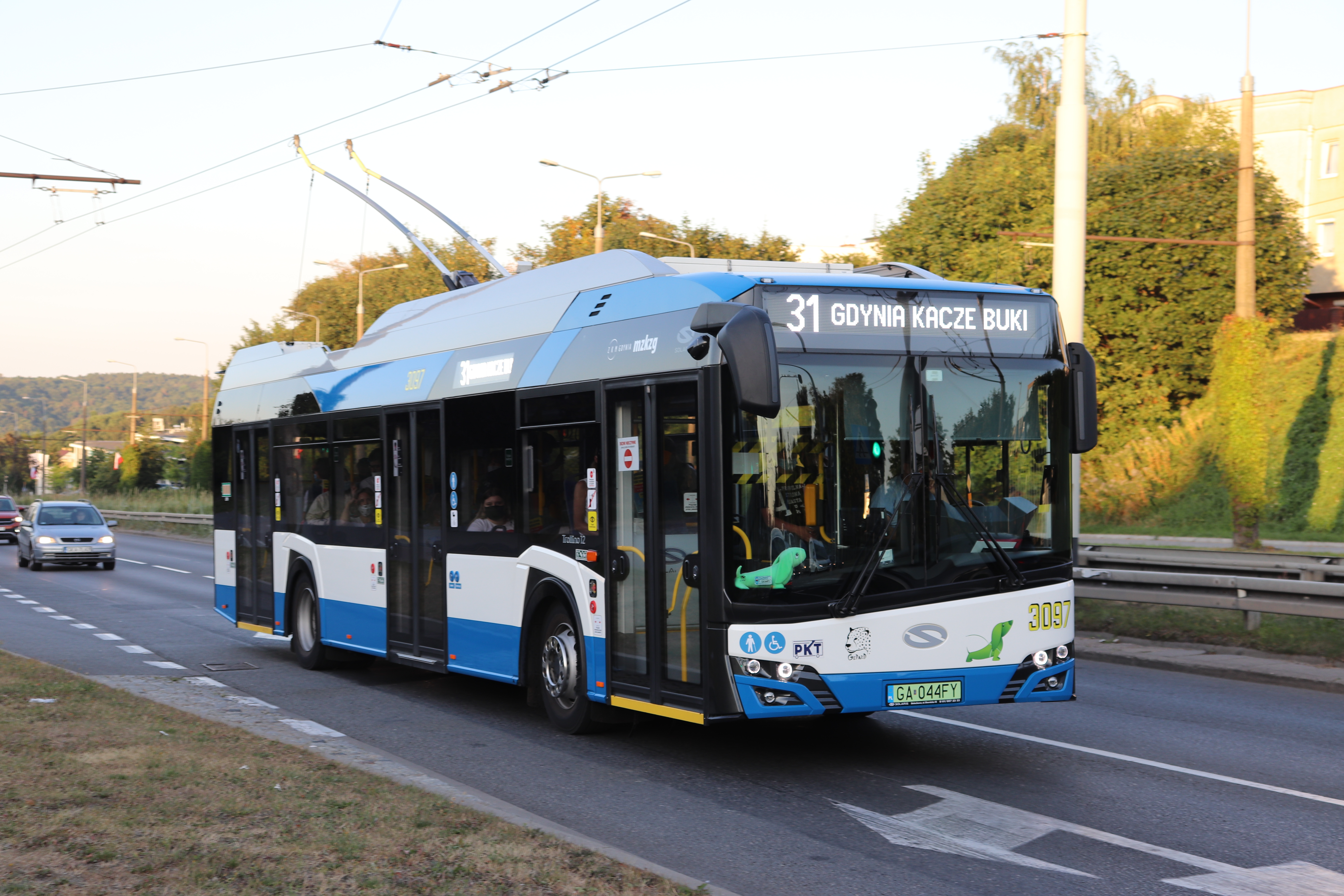
Solaris Trollino 12M in Gdynia

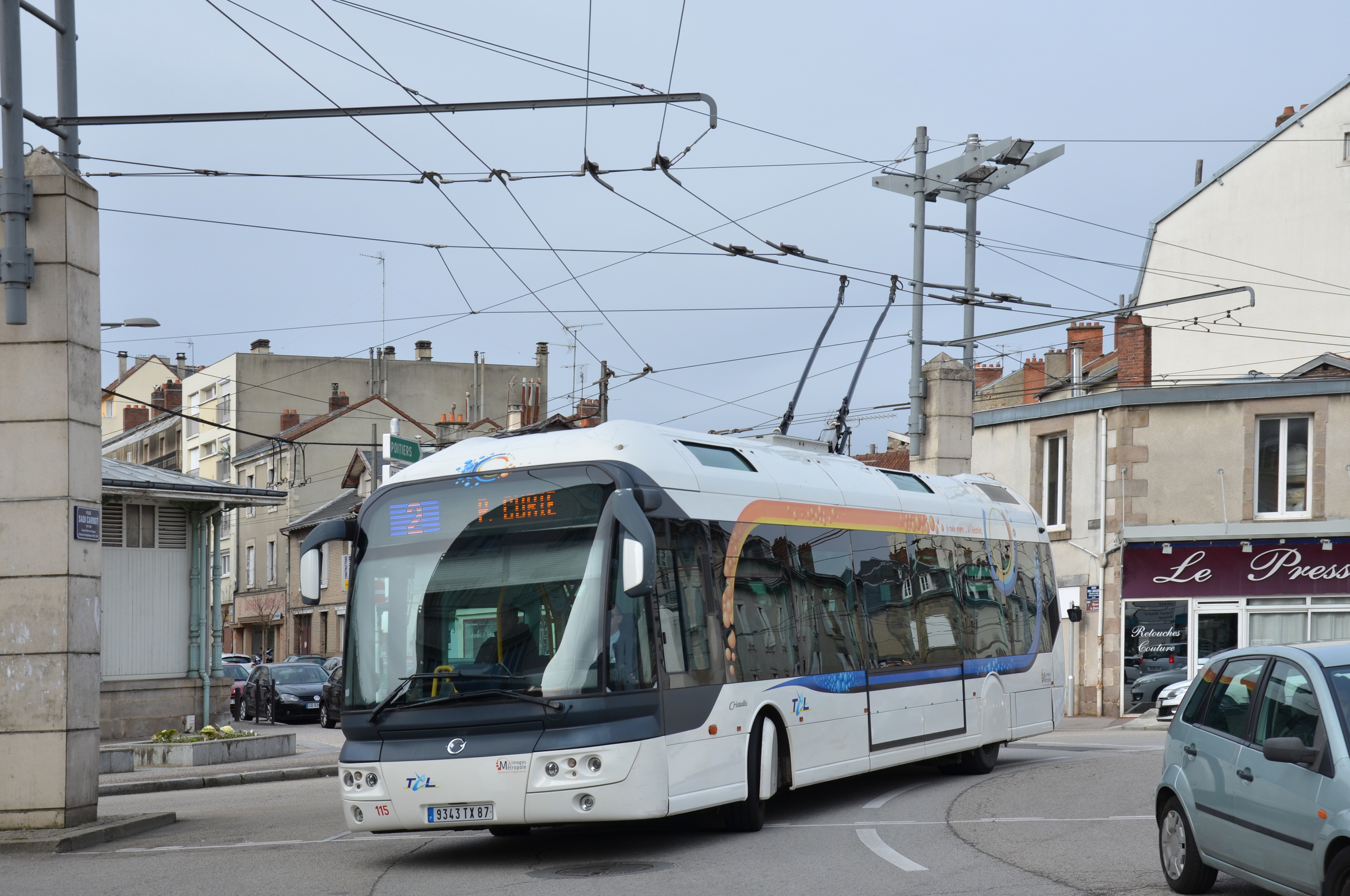
Irisbus Cristalis in Limoges

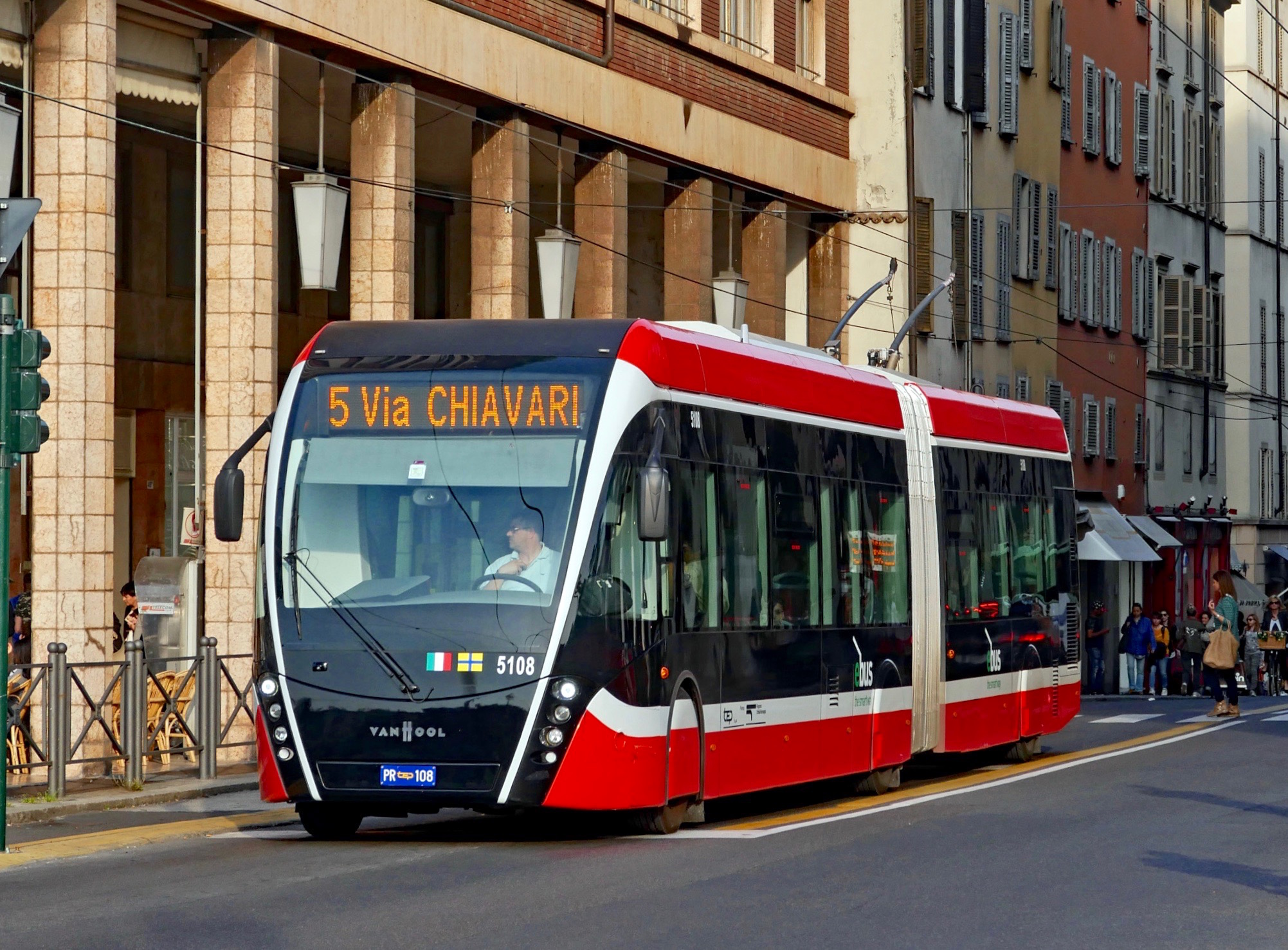
Van Hool Exquicity 18T in Parma

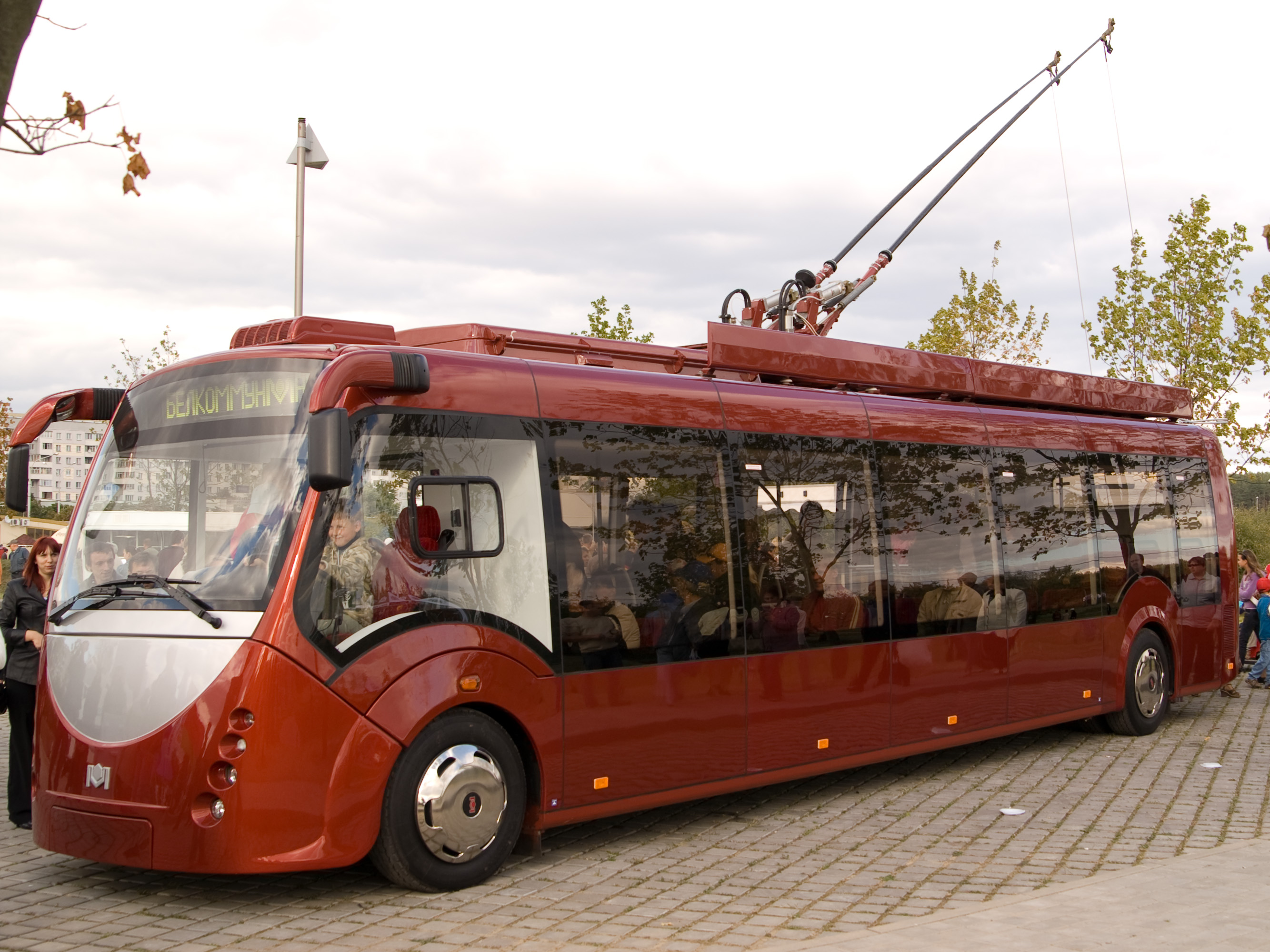
AKSM-420 Vitovt in Minsk

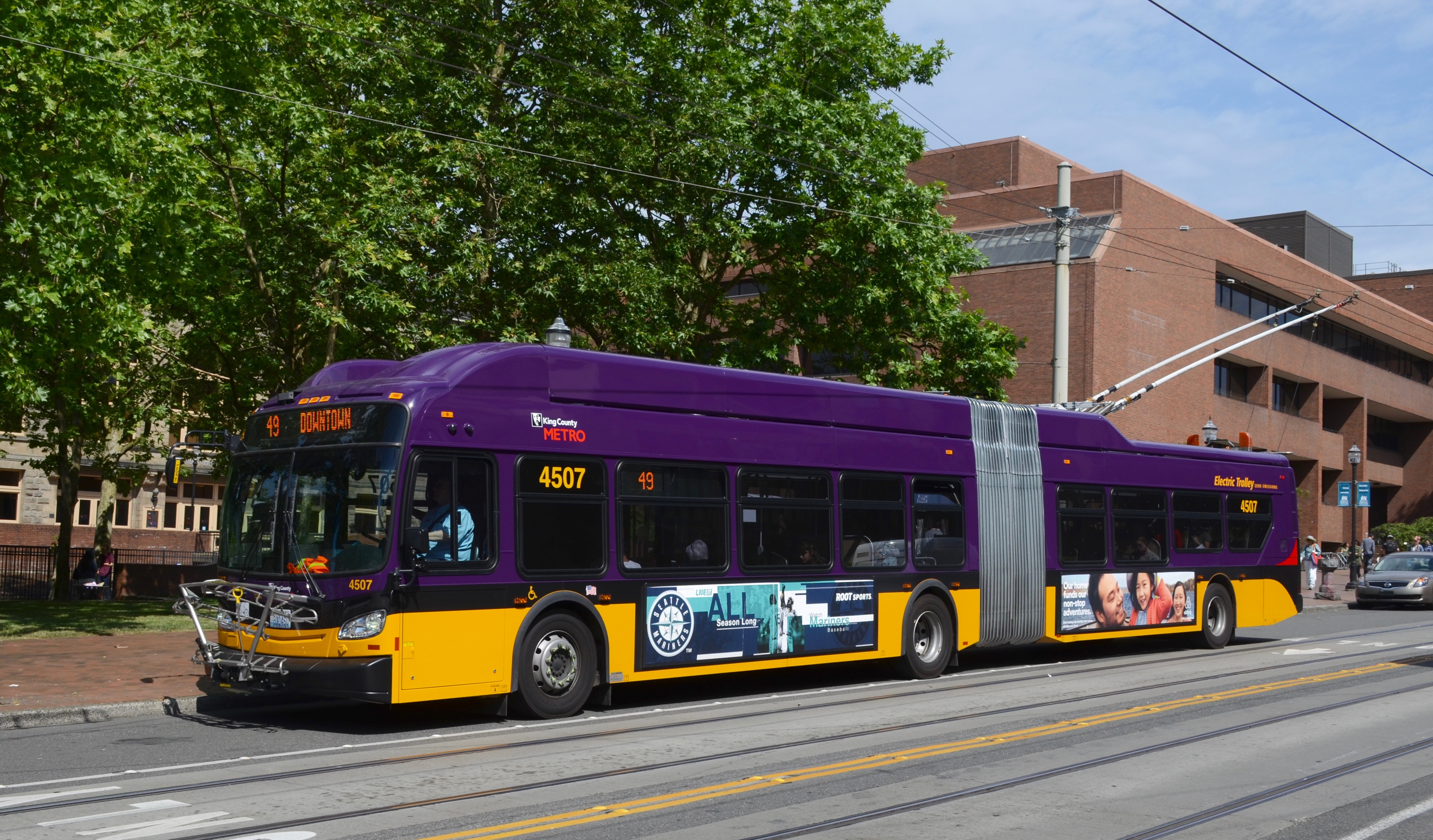
New Flyer XT60 in Seattle

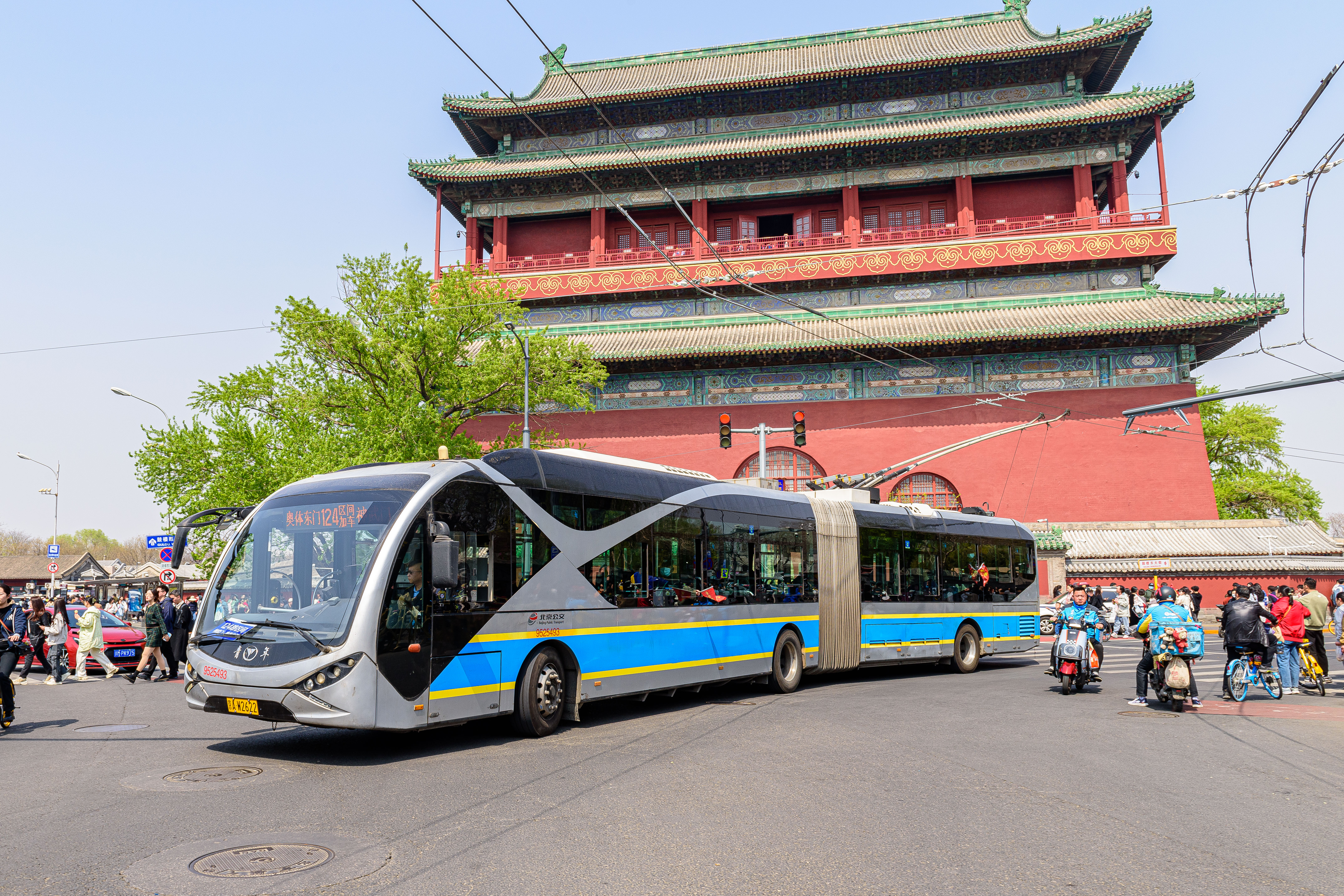
Youngman JNP6183BEV in Beijing

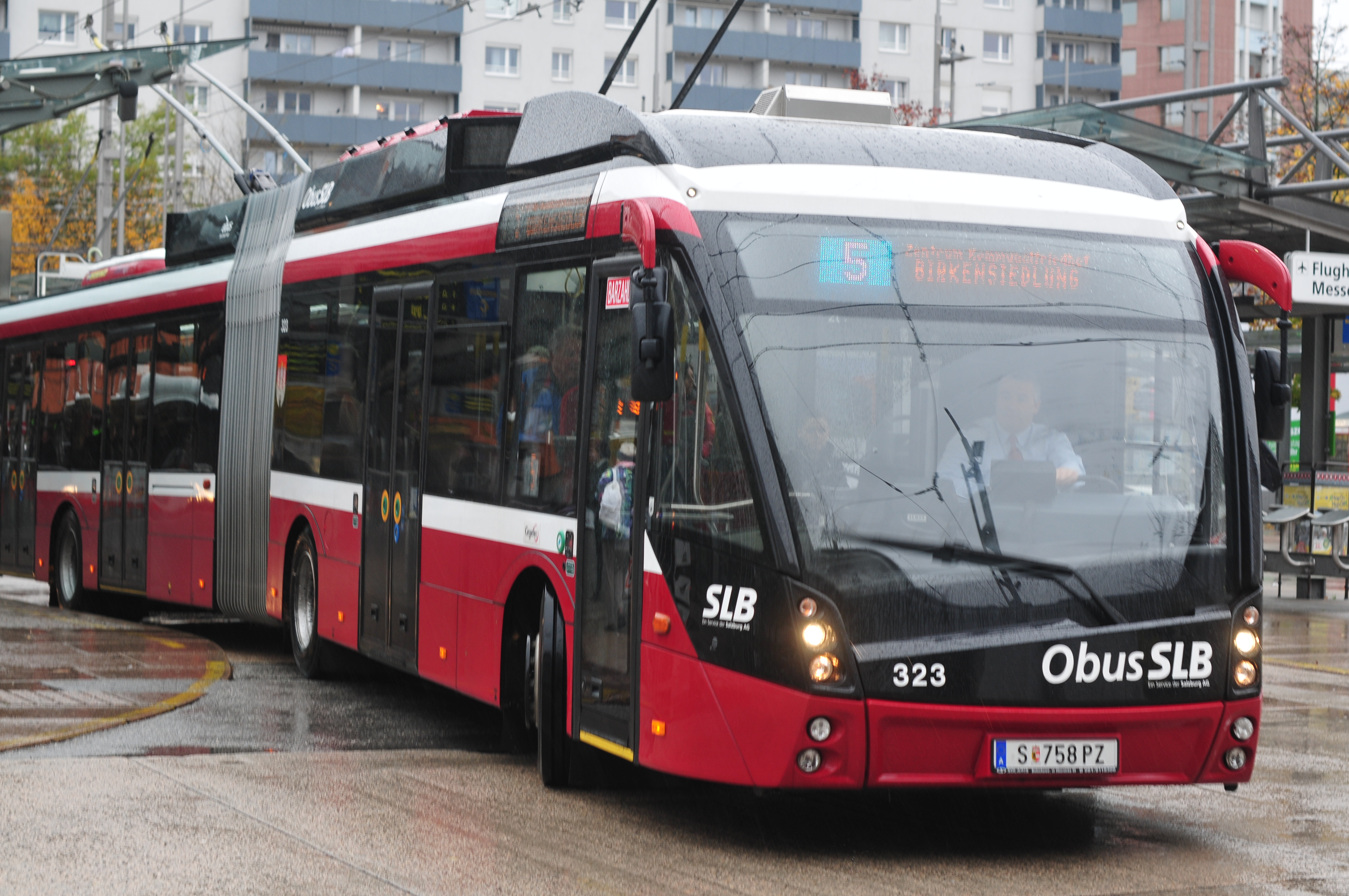
Solaris Trollino 18 in Salzburg

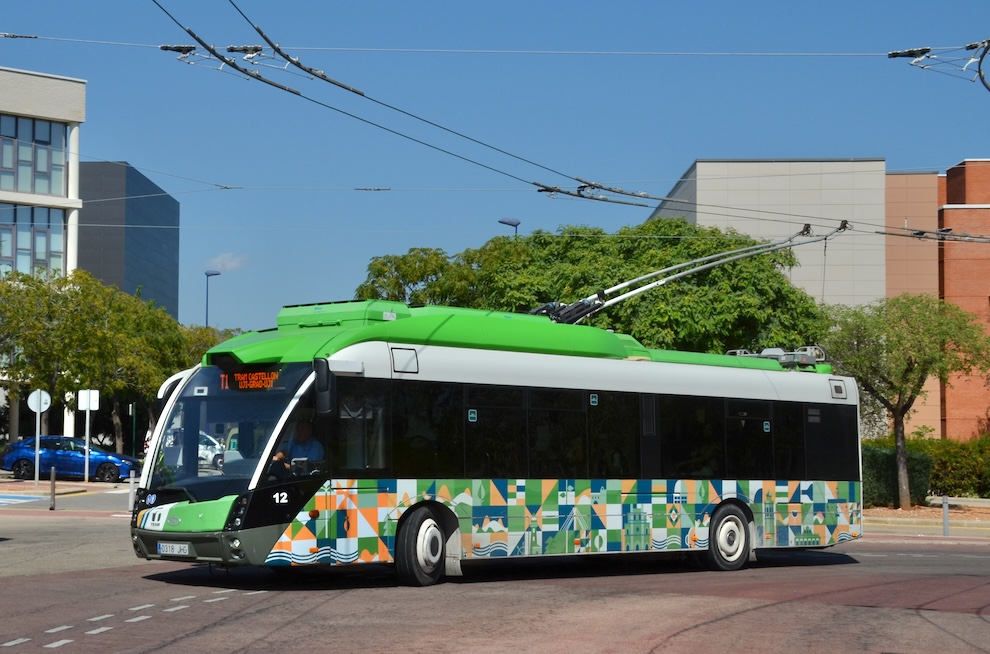
Trolleybus in Castellón de la Plana

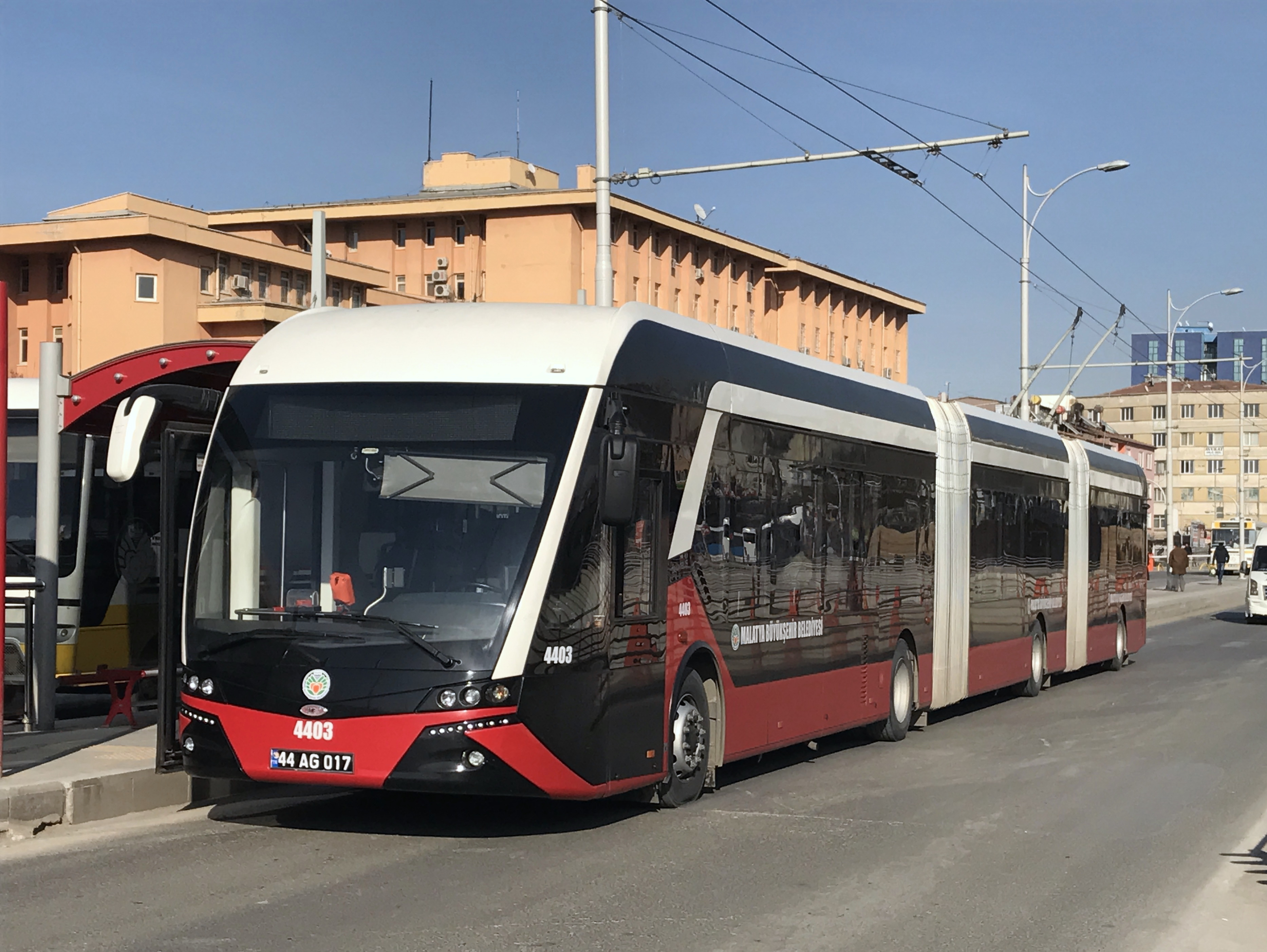
Trolleybus in Malatya

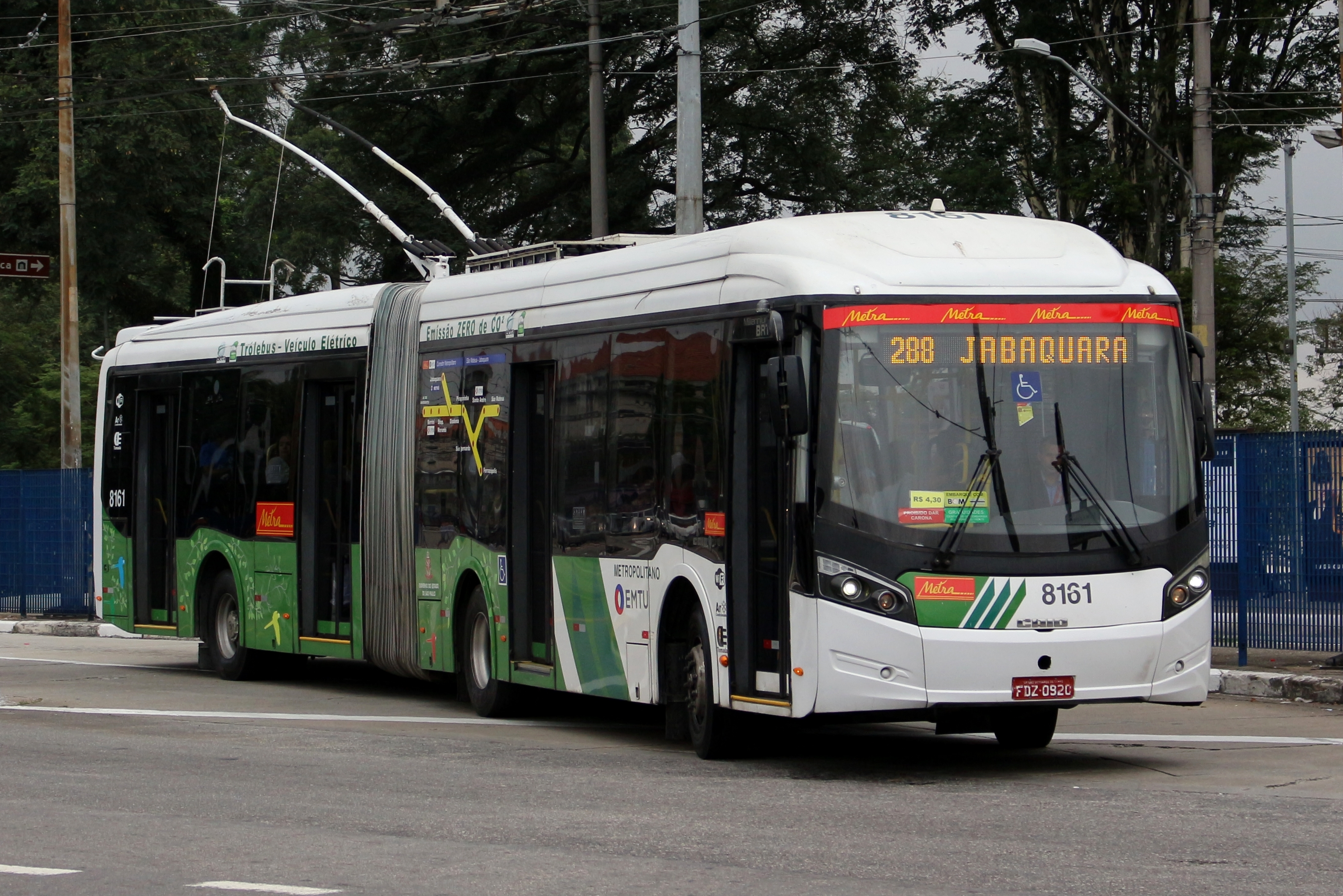
Articulated trolleybus in São Paulo

== Advantages ==
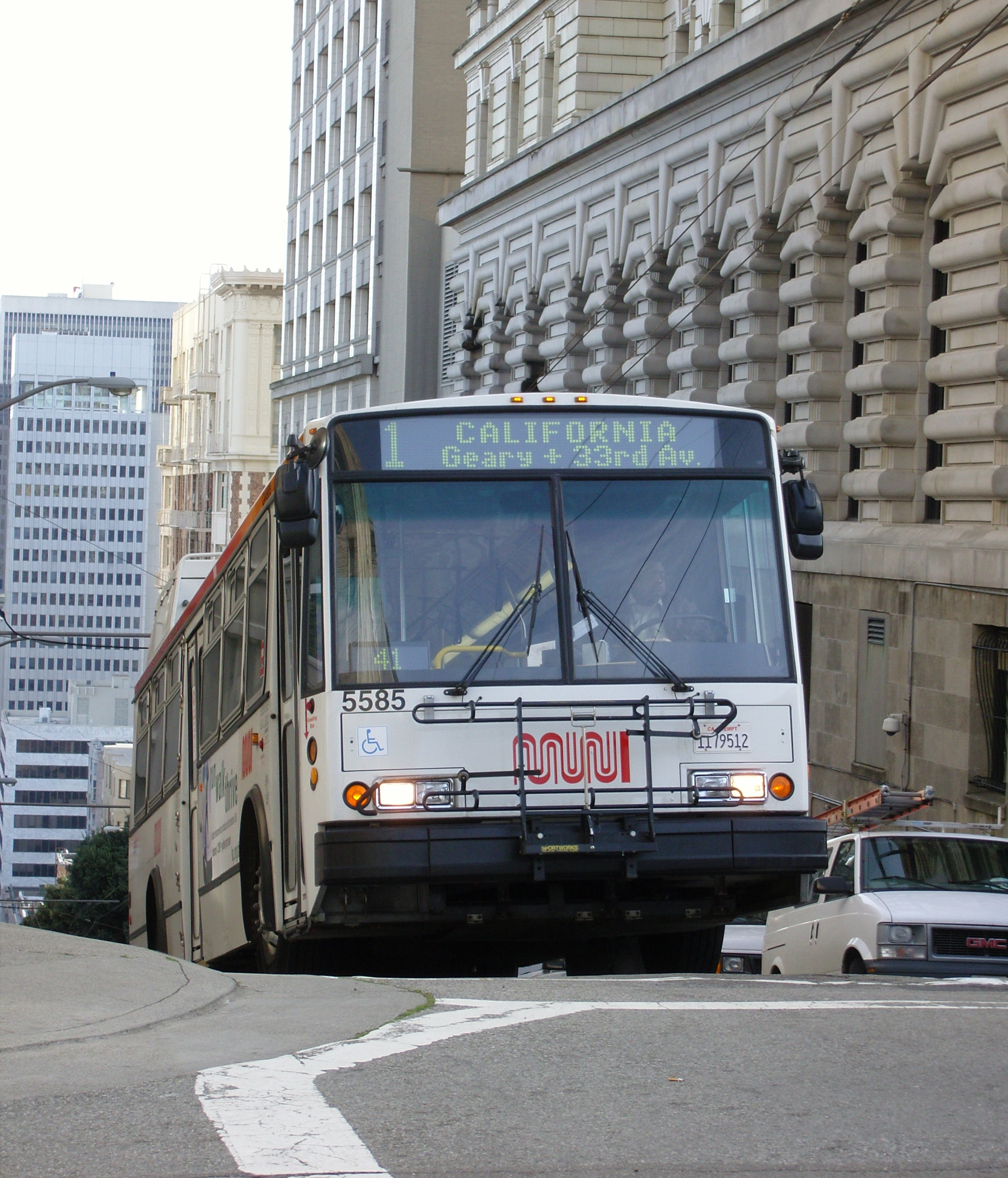
A San Francisco Muni trolleybus (ETI 14TrSF) climbing Nob Hill

=== Comparison to trams ===
- Cheaper infrastructure – The initial start up cost of trams is much higher, due to rail, signals, and other infrastructure. Trolleybuses can pull over to the curb like other buses, eliminating the need for special boarding stations or boarding islands in the middle of the street, thus stations can be moved as needed.
- Better hill climbing – Trolleybuses' rubber tyres have better adhesion than trams' steel wheels on steel rails, giving them better hill-climbing capability and braking.
- Easier traffic avoidance – Unlike trams (where side tracks are often unavailable), an out-of-service vehicle can be moved to the side of the road and its trolley poles lowered. The ability to drive a substantial distance from the power wires allows trackless vehicles to avoid obstacles, although it also means a possibility that the vehicle may steer or skid far enough that the trolley pole can no longer reach the wire, stranding the vehicle. Trackless trolleys also are able to avoid collisions by manoeuvring around obstacles, similar to motor buses and other road vehicles, while trams can only change speed.
- Quietness – Trolleybuses are generally quieter than trams.
- Easier training – The control of trolleybuses is relatively similar to motorbuses; the potential operator pool for all buses is much larger than for trams.

=== Comparison to motorbuses ===
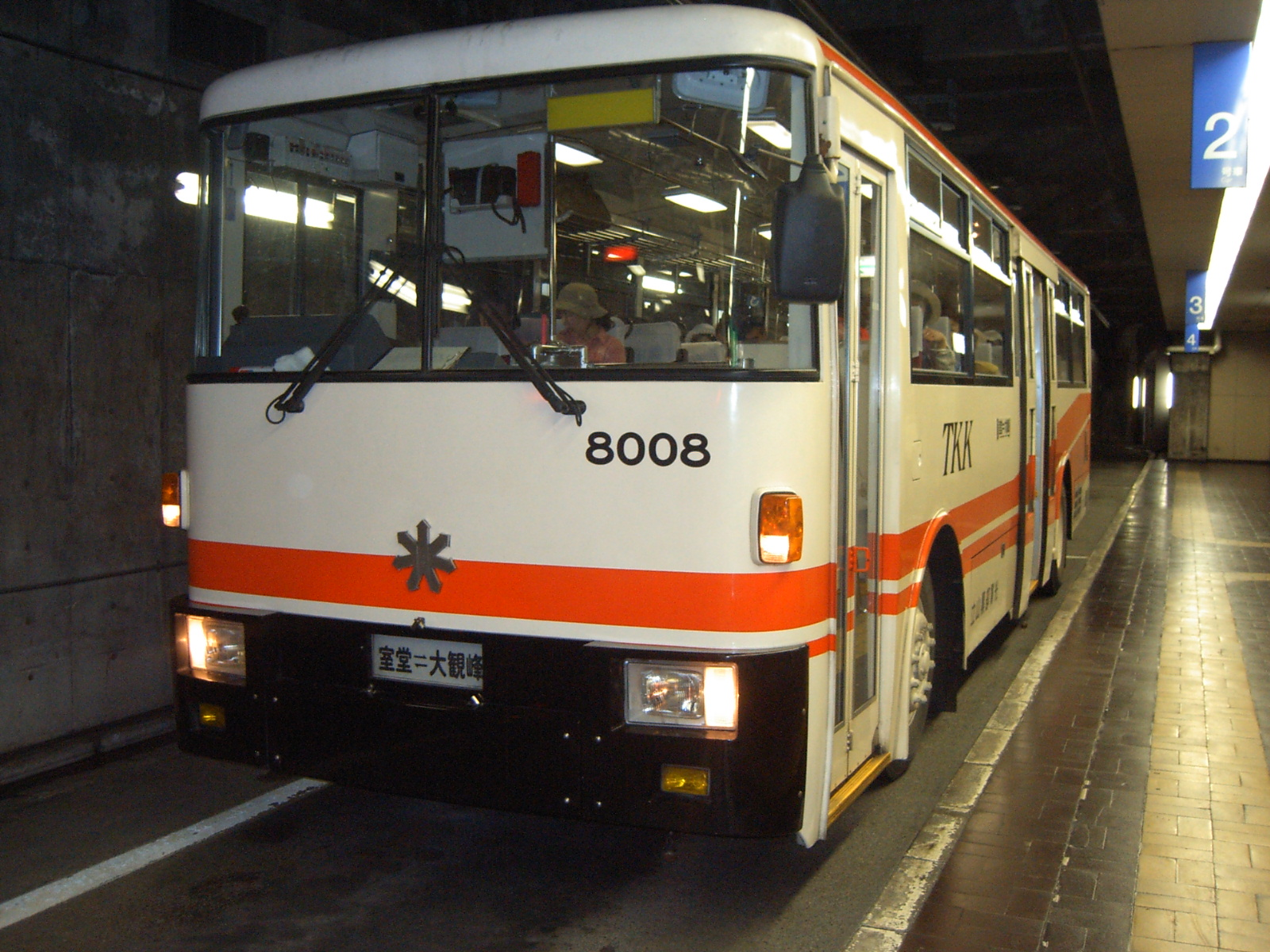
Trolleybus on tunnel line in Tateyama

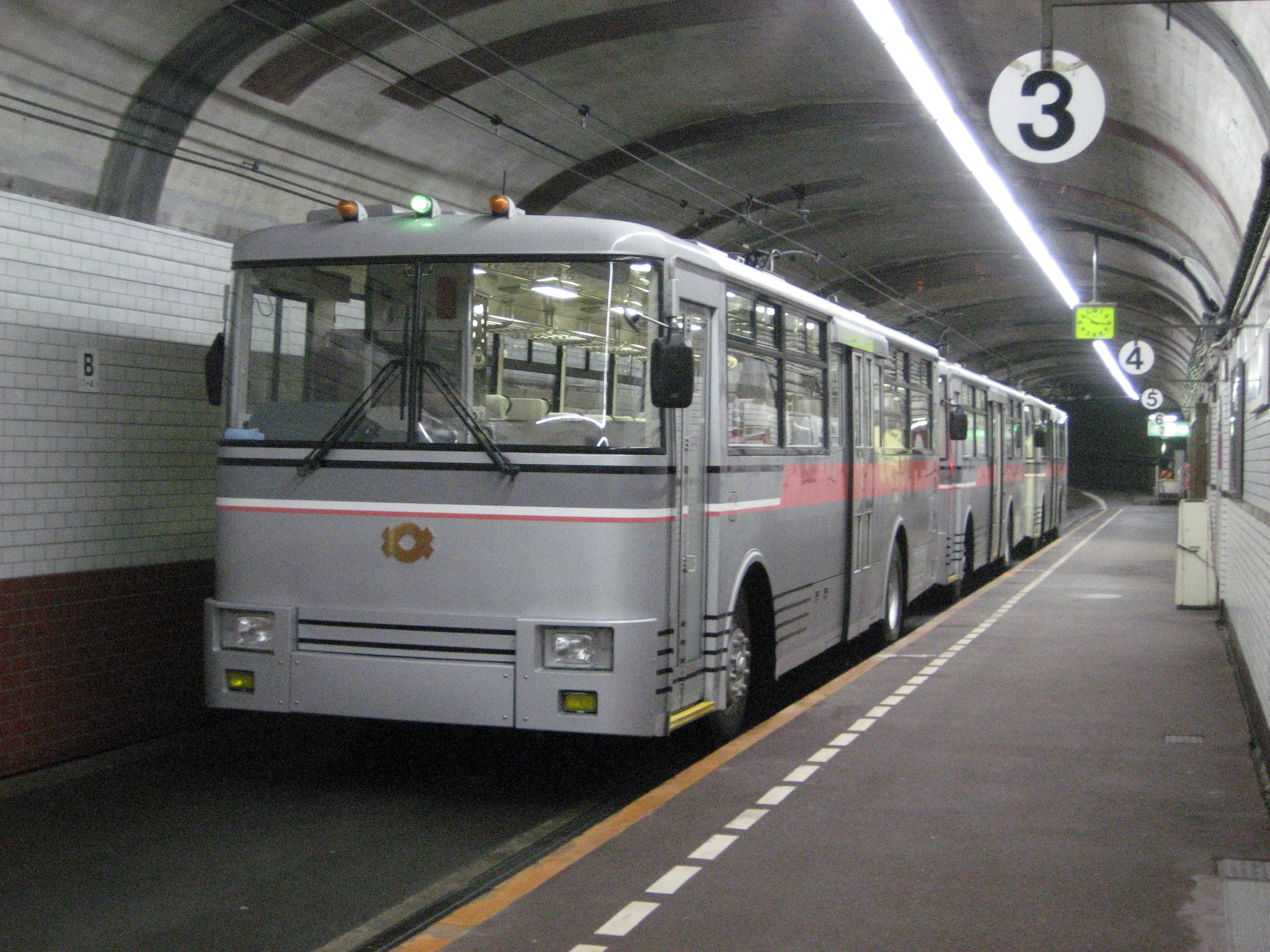
Underground trolleybus at Kurobe Dam Station

- Better hill climbing – Trolleybuses are better than motorbuses on hilly routes, as electric motors provide much higher static torque at start-up, an advantage for climbing steep hills. Unlike internal combustion engines, electric motors draw power from a central plant and can be overloaded for short periods without damage. San Francisco and Seattle, both hilly American cities, use trolleybuses partly for this reason. Given their acceleration and braking performance, trolleybuses can outperform diesel buses on flat stretches as well, which makes them better for routes that have frequent stops.
- Environmentally friendly – Trolleybuses are usually more environmentally friendly in the city than fossil fuel or hydrocarbon-based vehicles (petrol/gasoline, diesel, alcohol, etc.). Power from a centralized plant, even taking into account transmission losses, is often produced more efficiently, is not bound to a specific fuel source, and is more amenable to pollution control as a point source, unlike individual vehicles with exhaust gases and particulates at street level. Trolleybuses are especially favoured where electricity is abundant, cheap, and renewable, such as hydroelectric. Systems in Seattle and in Vancouver, BC, draw hydroelectric power from the Columbia River and other Pacific river systems. San Francisco operates its system using hydro power from the city-owned Hetch Hetchy generating plant.
- Trolleybuses can generate electricity from kinetic energy while braking, a process known as regenerative braking. For regenerative braking to function, there must be another bus on the same circuit needing power, an electric storage system on the vehicle or the wire system, or a method to send the excess power back to the commercial electric power system. Otherwise the braking energy must be dissipated in resistance grids on the bus; this is called "dynamic braking". The use of trolley buses also eliminates pollution during idling, thus improving air quality.
- Minimal noise pollution – Unlike trams or gasoline and diesel buses, trolleybuses are almost silent, lacking the noise of a combustion engine or wheels on rails. Most noise comes from auxiliary systems such as power steering pumps and air conditioning. Early trolleybuses without these systems were even quieter and in the United Kingdom were sometimes referred to as the "Silent Service". This however can also be seen as a disadvantage, with some pedestrians falling victim to what was known as "Silent Death" (in Britain) or "Whispering Death" (in Australia).
- Usable in enclosed space – The absence of exhaust gases allows trolleybuses to operate underground. In Cambridge, Massachusetts, trackless trolleys survived because Harvard Station, where several bus lines terminate, is in a tunnel once used by streetcars. Although diesel buses do use the tunnel, there are limitations due to exhaust fumes, which running the trolleybuses through aids in ventilation. Also, the trackless trolleys continue to have popular support. The only trolleybus systems in Japan, the Tateyama Tunnel Trolleybus and Kanden Tunnel Trolleybus lines, both run in tunnels serving the Kurobe Dam and Tateyama Kurobe Alpine Route, and were converted from normal diesel buses specifically for their lack of exhaust. Though both systems are replaced to be battery-driven as of 2025.
- Longevity and maintenance – Electric motors typically last longer than internal combustion motors, and cause less secondary damage from vibration, so electric buses tend to be very long-lived compared to motorbuses. As the basic construction of buses has not changed much in the last 50 plus years, they can be upgraded such as when air conditioning was retrofitted to many trolleybuses. Such upgrades are often disproportionately expensive. Wheelchair lifts are relatively simple to add; kneeling front suspension is a common feature of air suspension on the front axle in lieu of springs. In comparison to battery-powered buses, the lack of a specially designed battery or fuel cell (typically with expensive patents) decreases the price and weight, and in locations with a sufficient power delivery network, the trolleybus is cheaper and easier to maintain in comparison to those requiring charging stations.

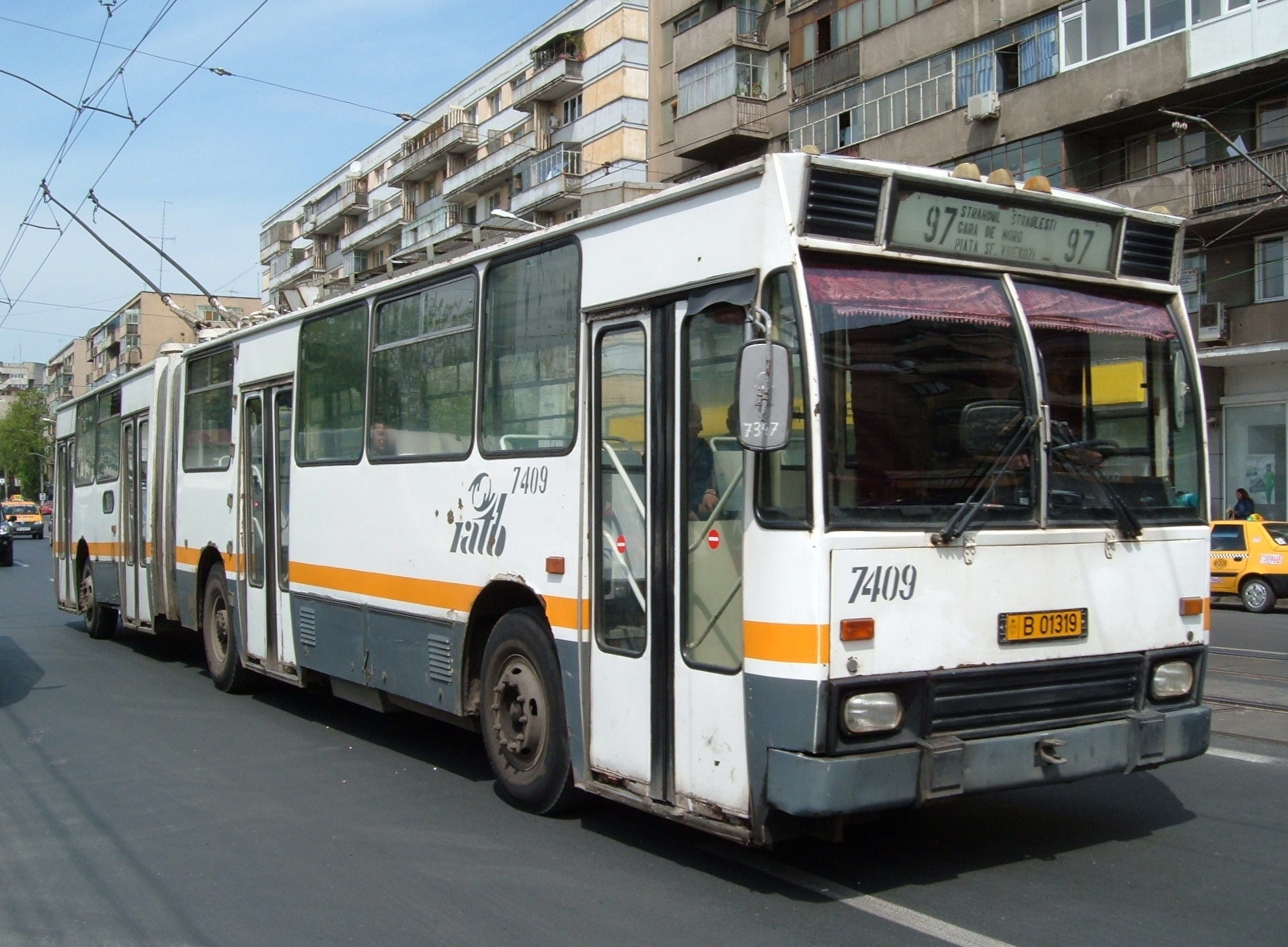
A Rocar DAC 217E articulated trolleybus in Bucharest, Romania, in April 2007

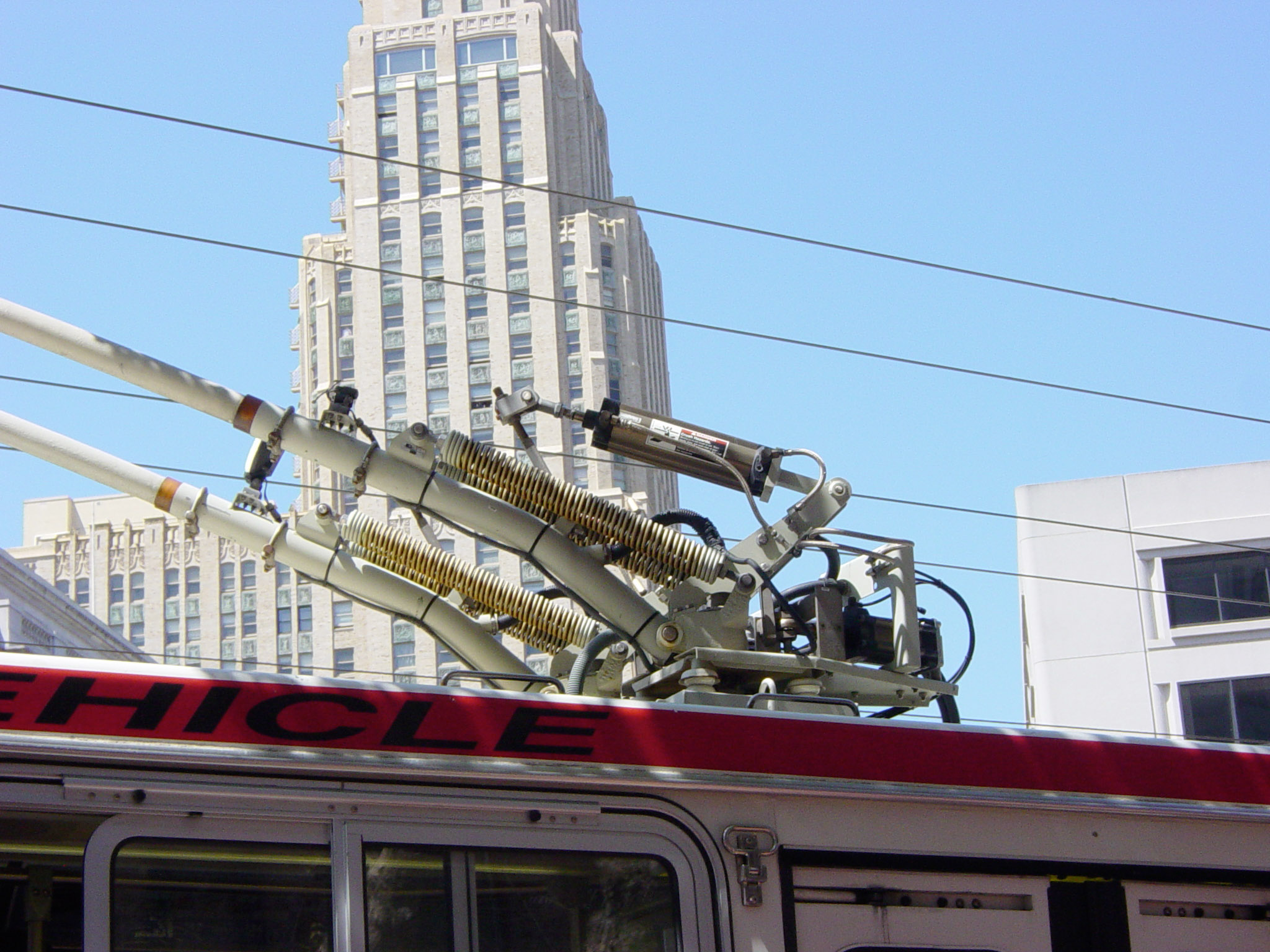
Pole bases with springs and pneumatic pole lowering cylinders

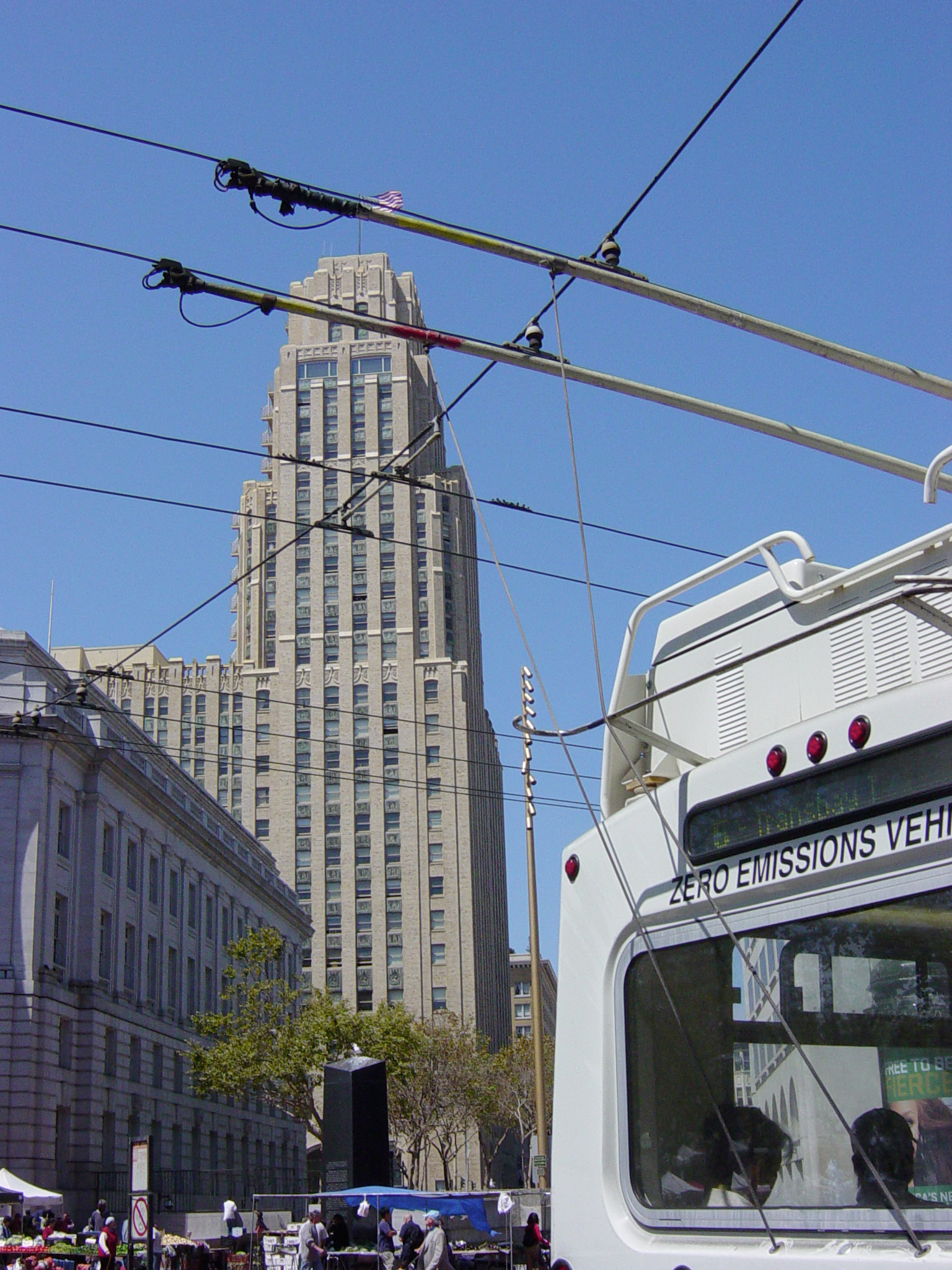
Insulated poles, contact shoes, and pull–ropes

== Disadvantages ==
=== Comparison to trams ===
Note: As there are numerous variations of tram and light-rail technology, the disadvantages listed may be applicable only with a specific technology or design.

- Like any bus, much less capacity than trams.
- More control required – Trolleybuses must be driven like motorbuses, requiring directional control by the driver.
- Higher rolling resistance – Rubber-tired vehicles generally have more rolling resistance than steel wheels, which decreases energy efficiency.
- Less efficient use of right-of-way – Lanes must be wider for unguided buses than for streetcars, since unguided buses can drift side-to-side. The use of guidance rail allows trams running in parallel lanes to pass closer together than drivers could safely steer.
- Difficulties with platform loading – Implementation of level platform loading with minimal gap, either at design stage or afterwards, is easier and cheaper to implement with rail vehicles.
- Wear of rubber tires leads to significant rubber pollution.

=== Comparison to motorbuses ===
- Difficult to re-route – When compared to motorbuses, trolleybuses have greater difficulties with temporary or permanent re-routings, wiring for which is not usually readily available outside of downtown areas where the buses may be re-routed via adjacent business area streets where other trolleybus routes operate. This problem was highlighted in Vancouver in July 2008, when an explosion closed several roads in the city's downtown core. Because of the closure, trolleys were forced to detour several miles off their route in order to stay on the wires, leaving major portions of their routes not in service and off-schedule.
- Aesthetics – The jumble of overhead wires may be seen as unsightly. Intersections often have a "webbed ceiling" appearance, due to multiple crossing and converging sets of trolley wires.
- Dewirements – Trolley poles sometimes come off the wire. Dewirements are relatively rare in modern systems with well-maintained overhead wires, hangers, fittings and contact shoes. Trolleybuses are equipped with special insulated pole ropes which drivers use to reconnect the trolley poles with the overhead wires. When approaching switches, trolleybuses usually must decelerate in order to avoid dewiring, and this deceleration can potentially add slightly to traffic congestion. In 1998, a dewirement in Shenyang on poorly maintained infrastructure killed 5 people and ultimately led to the destruction of the trolleybus network.
- Unable to overtake other trolleybuses – Trolleybuses cannot overtake one another in regular service unless two separate sets of wires with a switch are provided or the vehicles are equipped with off-wire capability, with the latter an increasingly common feature of new trolleybuses.
- Higher capital cost of equipment – Trolleybuses are often long-lived equipment, with limited market demand. This generally leads to higher prices relative to internal combustion buses. The long equipment life may also complicate upgrades.
- More training required – Drivers must learn how to prevent dewiring, slowing down at turns and through switches in the overhead wire system, for example.
- Overhead wires create obstruction – Trolleybus systems employ overhead wires above the roads, often shared with other vehicles. The wires can restrict tall motor vehicles such as delivery trucks ("lorries") and double decker buses from using or crossing roads fitted with overhead wires, as such vehicles would hit the wires or pass dangerously close to them, risking damage and dangerous electrical faults. The wires also may impede positioning of overhead signage and create a hazard to activities such as road repairs using tall excavators or piling rigs, use of scaffolding, etc.

== Off-wire capability ==
With the development of hybrid designs, trolleybuses are no longer tied to overhead wires. The ability for a trolleybus to operate off-wire has evolved from using internal combustion engines for full autonomy to modern high-capacity batteries that recharge while the vehicle is in motion.

=== Dual-mode buses (combustion engine + overhead lines) ===
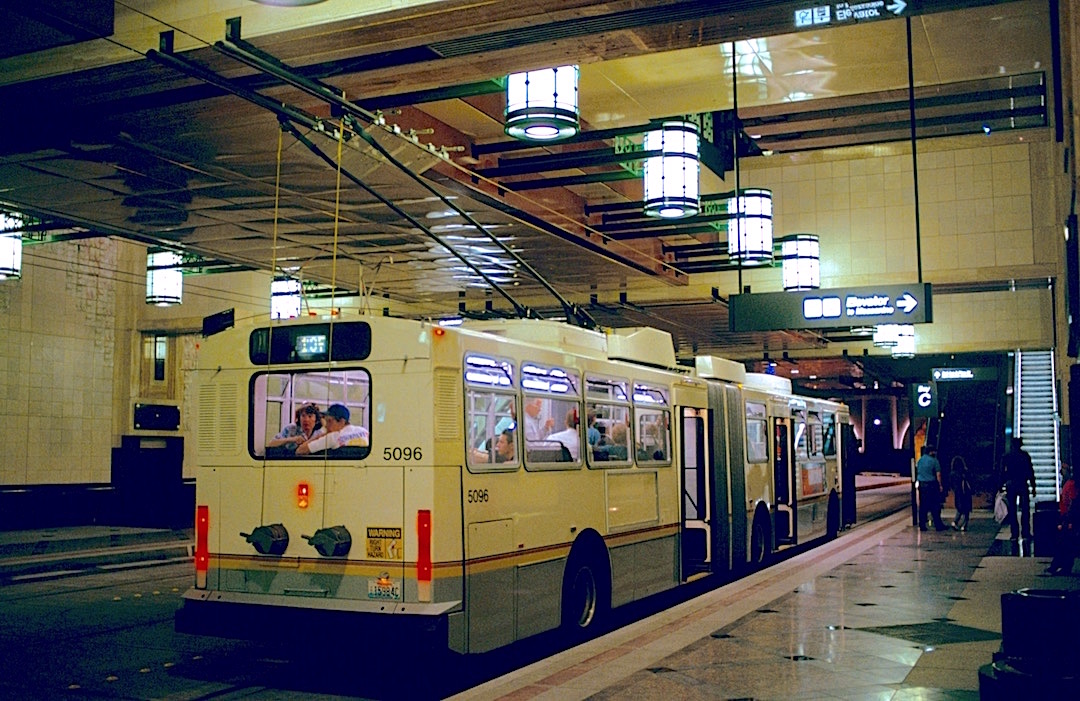
A dual-mode bus operating as a trolleybus in the Downtown Seattle Transit Tunnel in 1990

Historically, the first vehicles designed for significant off-wire operation were dual-mode buses, which combined a conventional diesel or gas engine with an electric propulsion system powered by overhead lines.

An early example was the "All Service Vehicle" (ASV), developed by the Public Service Company of New Jersey and Yellow Coach between 1935 and 1948. These were trackless trolleys capable of operating as gas-electric buses when off-wire.

In the late 20th century, dual-mode buses typically used their diesel engines for regular service on streets without overhead wires and switched to electric power in tunnels or environmentally sensitive areas to eliminate local emissions. Notable examples include:

- Seattle: From 1990 to 2005, King County Metro operated specially ordered articulated Breda buses in the Downtown Seattle Transit Tunnel. They ran as electric trolleybuses in the tunnel and switched to diesel power for on-street operation. Most of these were retired in 2005, though a few were converted to run exclusively as trolleybuses until 2016.
- Boston: The Massachusetts Bay Transportation Authority (MBTA) used dual-mode buses on its Silver Line (Waterfront) route from 2004 until June 2023, employing a similar operational strategy to manage air quality in tunnels.

These classic diesel-electric dual-mode buses have since been largely phased out in favor of newer technologies.

=== Auxiliary Power Units (APUs) ===
Since the 1980s, many trolleybuses have been equipped with limited off-wire capability for auxiliary or emergency use only. These systems, featuring a small diesel engine or a battery pack, are generally not considered dual-mode buses. Their purpose is to allow the vehicle to get around a route blockage, navigate through depots, or travel short distances without overhead wiring.

This capability has become increasingly common, particularly in North America, Europe, and China, where the vast majority of new trolleybuses delivered since the 1990s are fitted with at least a limited off-wire system. Notable adopters of such vehicles include Muni in San Francisco, TransLink in Vancouver, and systems in Beijing. In 2008, SEPTA in Philadelphia placed new trackless trolleys in service equipped with small hybrid diesel-electric power units for this purpose.

=== In-Motion Charging (IMC) ===
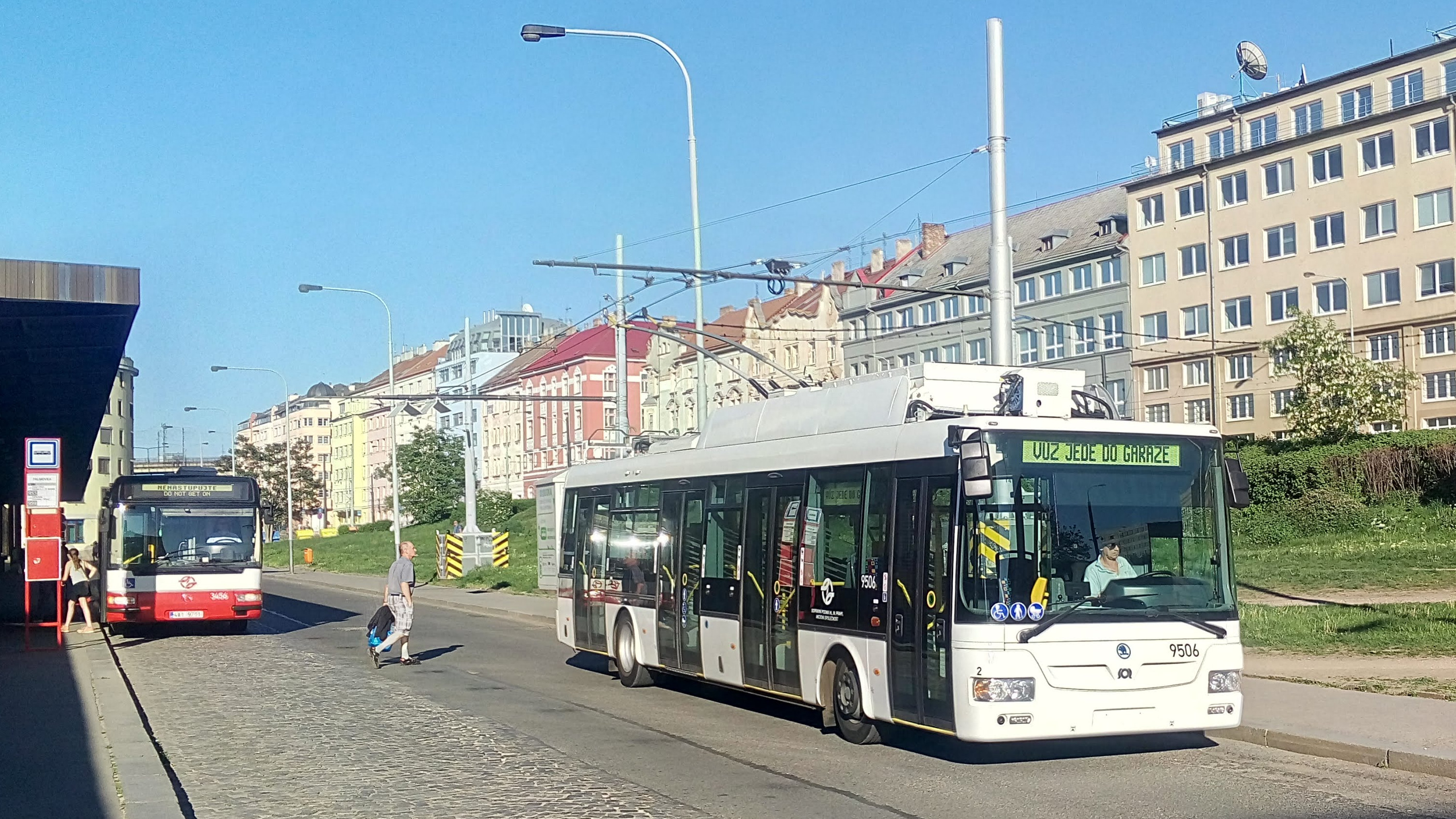
A Škoda 30 Tr trolleybus in Prague, which uses In-Motion Charging technology.

The advancement of battery technology, particularly Li-ion, has led to the development of in-motion charging (IMC) technology. These vehicles, also known as battery trolleybuses or electric buses with dynamic charging, are equipped with a high-capacity on-board battery that is charged from the overhead wires while the vehicle is in motion.

This allows the trolleybus to operate for significant distances—often in excess of 15 km—on battery power alone, enabling the extension of routes or the electrification of new lines without needing to build overhead wires along the entire route. The term "In-Motion Charging" was introduced as a branding concept by Erik Lenz from Vossloh Kiepe in 2014 to highlight this key advantage.

The main advantages of IMC over conventional battery-electric buses are the smaller and lighter battery required, the elimination of charging delays at terminals, and a reduced need for dedicated charging infrastructure. This technology is now used in cities such as Beijing, Shanghai, Ostrava, Saint Petersburg, and Bergen. Entirely new trolleybus systems in Marrakesh, Baoding, and Prague were designed exclusively around IMC vehicles.

== Other considerations ==
With increasing diesel fuel costs and problems caused by particulate matter and NO_{x} emissions in cities, trolleybuses can be an attractive alternative, either as the primary transit mode or as a supplement to rapid transit and commuter rail networks.

Trolleybuses are quieter than internal combustion engine vehicles. Mainly a benefit, it also provides much less warning of a trolleybus's approach. A speaker attached to the front of the vehicle can raise the noise to a desired "safe" level. This noise can be directed to pedestrians in front of the vehicle, as opposed to motor noise which typically comes from the rear of a bus and is more noticeable to bystanders than to pedestrians.

Trolleybuses can share overhead wires and other electrical infrastructure (such as substations) with tramways. This can result in cost savings when trolleybuses are added to a transport system that already has trams, though this refers only to potential savings over the cost of installing and operating trolleybuses alone.

== Two parallel wires ==
The wires are attached to poles next to the street and carefully stretched and mounted so that they are the same width apart and same height over the road (usually about 18 to 20 feet (~5.7m)). The pair of wires is insulated from the poles and provides about 500 to 600 volts to the bus below.

== Wire switches ==
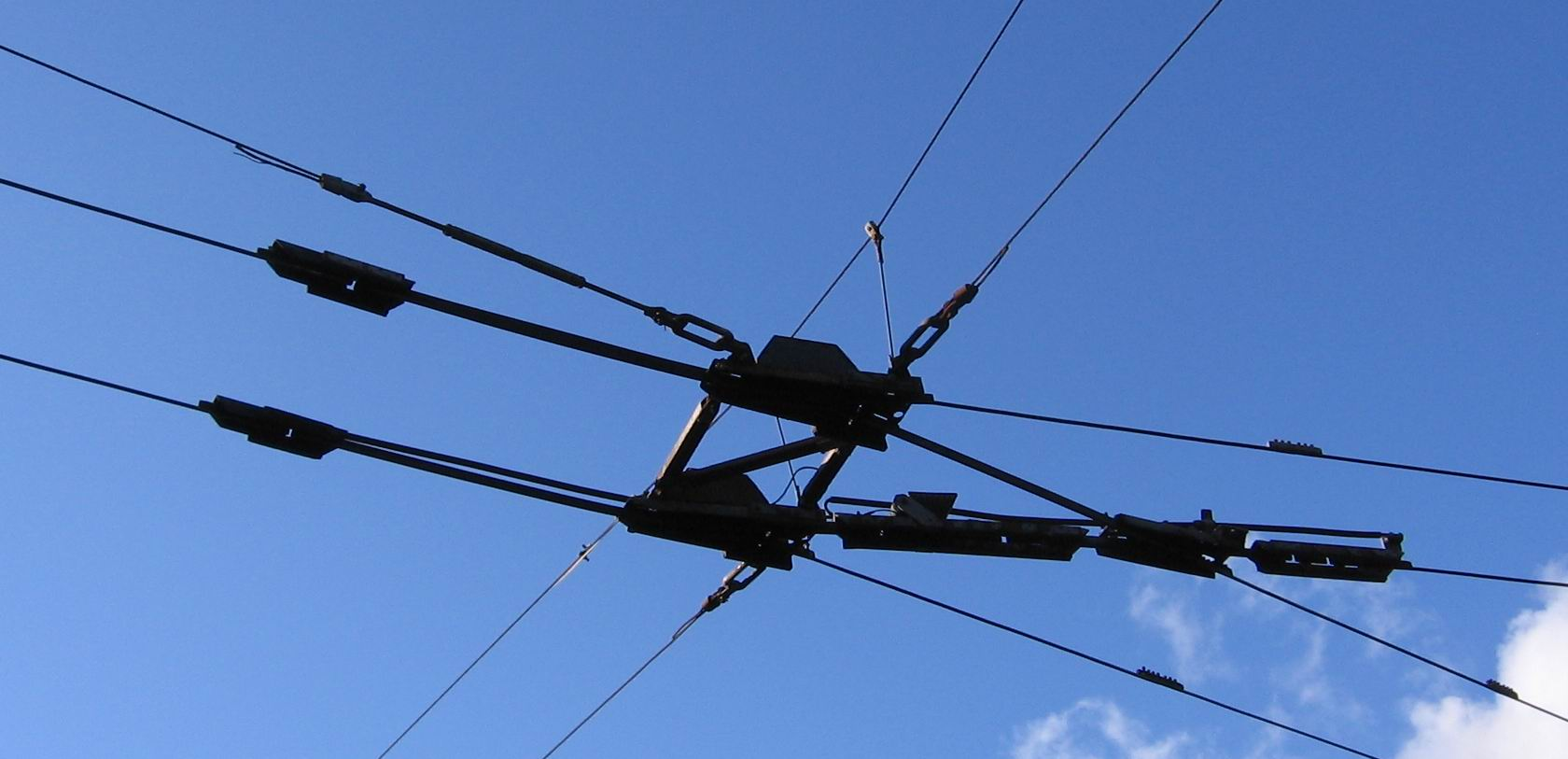
Trolleybus wire switch (Type Soviet Union)

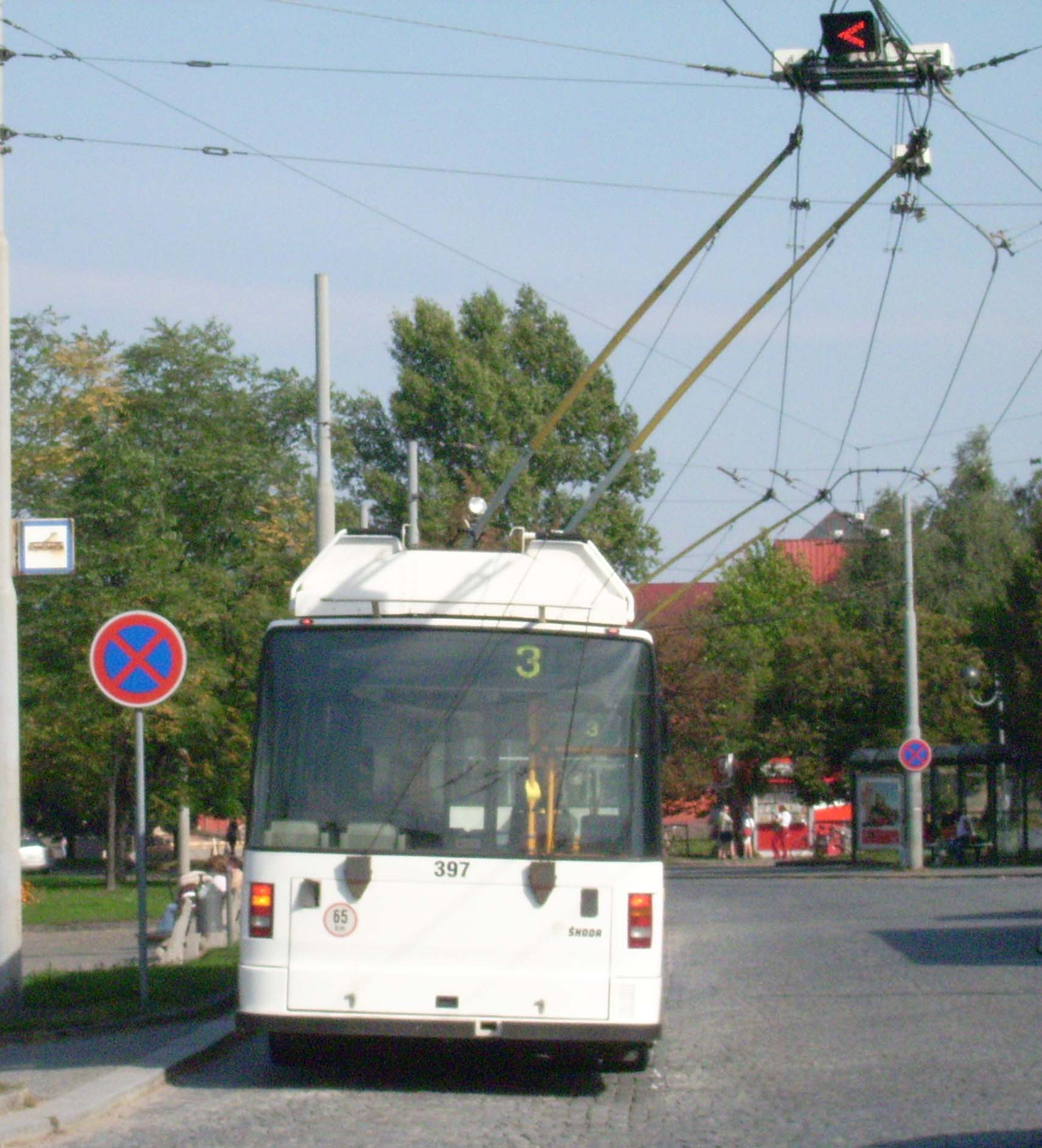
A switch in parallel overhead lines

Trolleybus wire switches (called "frogs" in the UK) are used where a trolleybus line branches into two or where two lines join. A switch may be either in a "straight through" or "turnout" position; it normally remains in the "straight through" position unless it has been triggered, and reverts to it after a few seconds or after the pole shoe passes through and strikes a release lever (in Boston, the resting or "default" position is the "leftmost" position). Triggering is typically accomplished by a pair of contacts, one on each wire close to and before the switch assembly, which power a pair of electromagnets, one in each frog with diverging wires ("frog" generally refers to one fitting that guides one trolley wheel/shoe onto a desired wire or across one wire. Occasionally, "frog" has been used to refer to the entire switch assembly).

Multiple branches may be handled by installing more than one switch assembly. For example, to provide straight-through, left-turn or right-turn branches at an intersection, one switch is installed some distance from the intersection to choose the wires over the left-turn lane, and another switch is mounted closer to or in the intersection to choose between straight through and a right turn (this would be the arrangement in countries such as the United States, where traffic directionality is right-handed; in left-handed traffic countries such as the United Kingdom and New Zealand, the first switch (before the intersection) would be used to access the right-turn lanes, and the second switch (usually in the intersection) would be for the left-turn).

Three common types of switches exist: power-on/power-off (the picture of a switch above is of this type), Selectric, and Fahslabend.

A power-on/power-off switch is triggered if the trolleybus is drawing considerable power from the overhead wires, usually by accelerating, at the moment the poles pass over the contacts (the contacts are lined up on the wires in this case). If the trolleybus "coasts" through the switch, the switch will not activate. Some trolleybuses, such as those in Philadelphia and Vancouver, have a manual "power-coast" toggle switch that turns the power on or off. This allows a switch to be triggered in situations that would otherwise be impossible, such as activating a switch while braking or accelerating through a switch without activating it. One variation of the toggle switch will simulate accelerating by causing a larger power draw (through a resistance grid), but will not simulate coasting and prevent activation of the switch by cutting the power.

A Selectric switch has a similar design, but the contacts on the wires are skewed, often at a 45-degree angle, rather than being lined up. This skew means that a trolleybus going straight through will not trigger the switch, but a trolleybus making a turn will have its poles match the contacts in a matching skew (with one pole shoe ahead of the other), which will trigger the switch regardless of power draw (accelerating versus coasting).

For a Fahslabend switch, the trolleybus's turn indicator control (or a separate driver-controlled switch) causes a coded radio signal to be sent from a transmitter, often attached to a trolley pole. The receiver is attached to the switch and causes it to trigger if the correct code is received. This has the advantage that the driver does not need to be accelerating the bus (as with a power-on/power-off switch) or trying to make a sharp turn (as with a Selectric switch).

Trailing switches (where two sets of wires merge) do not require action by the operator. The frog runners are pushed into the desired position by the trolley shoe, or the frog is shaped so the shoe is guided onto the exit wire without any moving parts.

== Manufacturing ==
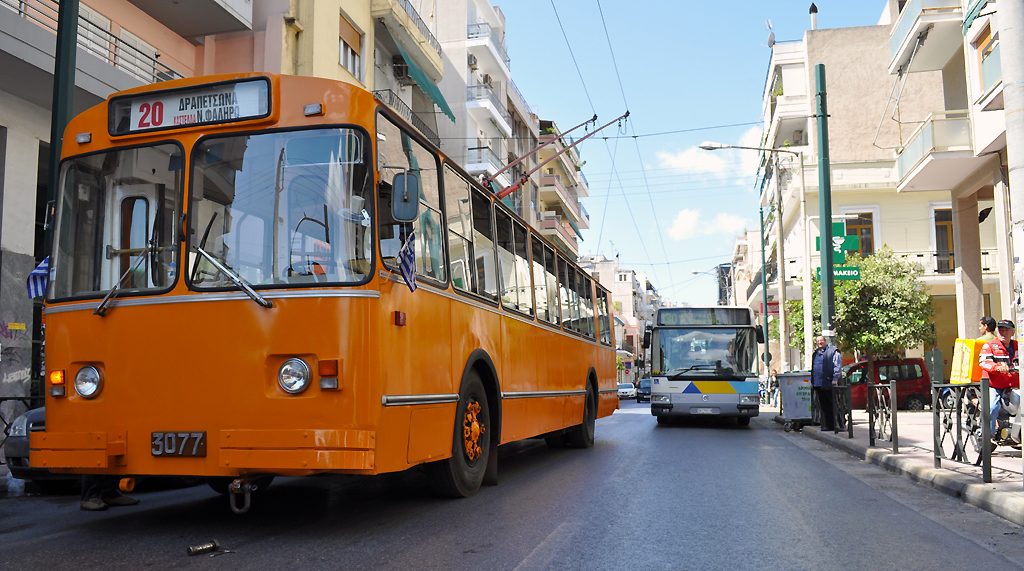
A ZiU-9 trolleybus in service in Piraeus, Greece, on the large Athens-area trolleybus system. The Russian-built ZiU-9 (also known as the ZiU-682), introduced in 1972, is the most numerous trolleybus model in history, with more than 45,000 built. In the 2000s it was effectively rendered obsolete by low-floor designs.

Well over 200 different trolleybus makers have existed – mostly commercial manufacturers, but in some cases (particularly in communist countries), built by the publicly owned operating companies or authorities. Of the defunct or former trolleybus manufacturers, the largest producers in North America and Western Europe – ones whose production totalled more than 1,000 units each – included the U.S. companies Brill (approx. 3,250 total), Pullman-Standard (2,007), and Marmon-Herrington (1,624); the English companies AEC (approx. 1,750), British United Traction (BUT) (1,573), Leyland (1,420) and Sunbeam (1,379); France's Vétra (more than 1,750); and the Italian builders Alfa Romeo (2,044) and Fiat (approx. 1,700). The largest former trolleybus manufacture is Trolza (formerly Uritsky, or ZiU) since 1951, until they declared their bankruptcy in 2017, building over 65000 trolleybuses. Also, Canadian Car and Foundry built 1,114 trolleybuses based on designs by Brill.

As of the 2010s, at least 30 trolleybus manufacturers exist. They include companies that have been building trolleybuses for several decades, such as Škoda since 1936 and New Flyer, among others, along with several younger companies. Current trolleybus manufacturers in western and central Europe include Solaris, Van Hool, and Hess, among others. In Russia ZiU/Trolza has historically been the world's largest trolleybus manufacturer, producing over 65,000 since 1951, mostly for Russia/CIS countries, but after its bankruptcy, its facilities were partially loaned out to PC Transport Systems. Škoda is Western and Central Europe's largest and the second largest in the world, having produced over 14,000 trolleybuses since 1936, mostly for export, and it also supplies trolleybus electrical equipment for other bus builders such as Solaris, SOR and Breda. In Mexico, trolleybus production ended when MASA, which had built more than 860 trolleybuses since 1979, was acquired in 1998 by Volvo. However, Dina, which is now that country's largest bus and truck manufacturer, began building trolleybuses in 2013.

== Transition to low-floor designs ==
A significant change to trolleybus designs starting in the early 1990s was the introduction of low-floor models, which began only a few years after the first such models were introduced for motorbuses. These have gradually replaced high-floor designs, and by 2012, every existing trolleybus system in Western Europe had purchased low-floor trolleybuses, with the La Spezia (Italy) system being the last one to do so, and several systems in other parts of the world have purchased low-floor vehicles.

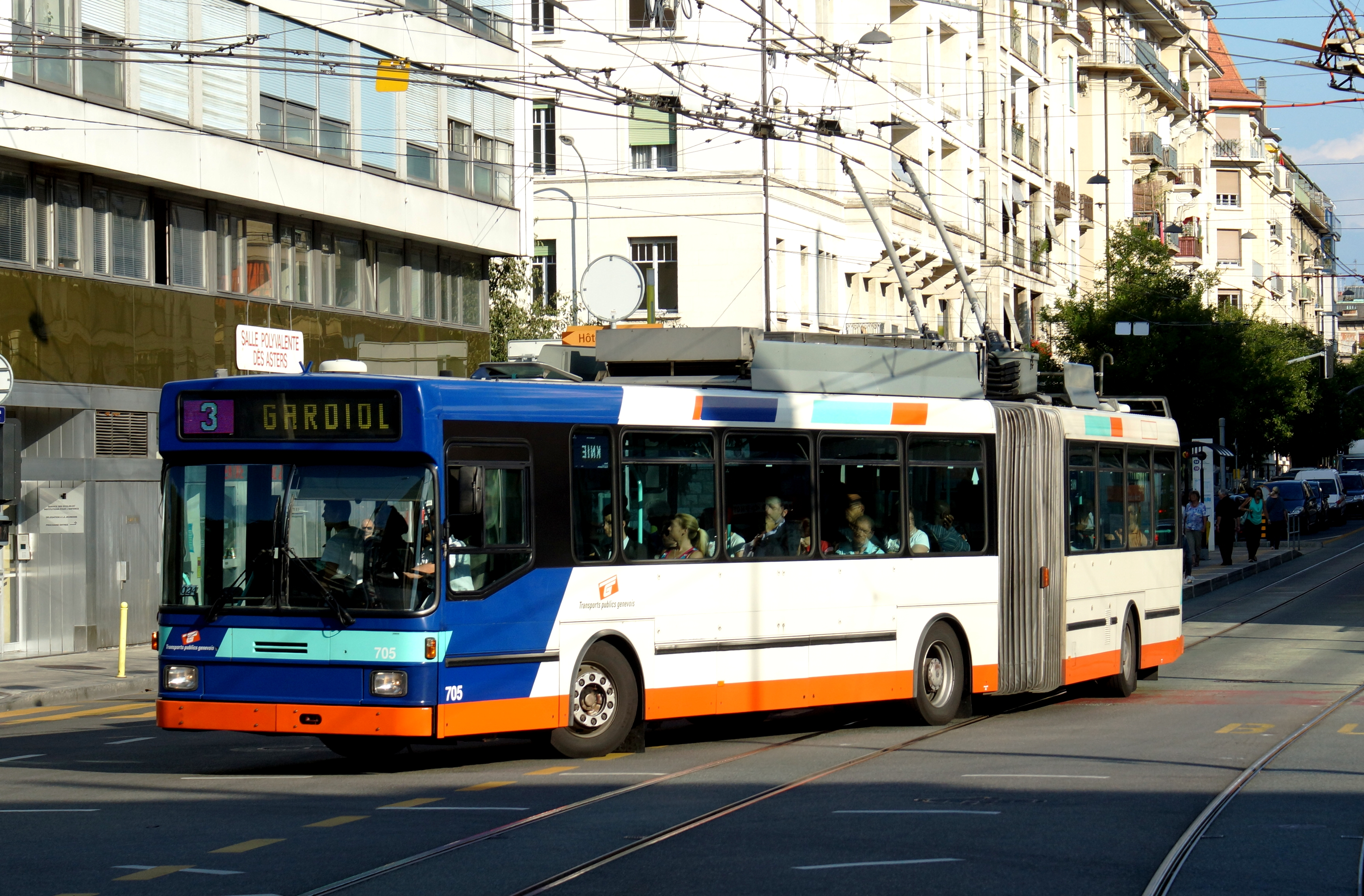
One of the NAW/Hess articulated trolleybuses delivered to Geneva in 1992, which were among the first production-series low-floor trolleybuses

In the United States, some transit agencies had already begun to accommodate persons in wheelchairs by purchasing buses with wheelchair lifts, and early examples of fleets of lift-equipped trolleybuses included 109 AM General trolleybuses built for the Seattle trolleybus system in 1979 and the retrofitting of lifts in 1983 to 64 Flyer E800s in the Dayton system's fleet. The Americans with Disabilities Act of 1990 required that all new transit vehicles placed into service after 1 July 1993 be accessible to such passengers.

Trolleybuses in other countries also began to introduce better access for the disabled in the 1990s, when the first two low-floor trolleybus models were introduced in Europe, both built in 1991, a "Swisstrolley" demonstrator built by Switzerland's NAW/Hess and an N6020 demonstrator built by Neoplan. The first production-series low-floor trolleybuses were built in 1992: 13 by NAW for the Geneva system and 10 Gräf & Stift for the Innsbruck system. By 1995, such vehicles were also being made by several other European manufacturers, including Skoda, Breda, Ikarus, and Van Hool. The first Solaris "Trollino" made its debut in early 2001. In the former Soviet Union countries, Belarus' Belkommunmash built its first low-floor trolleybus (model AKSM-333) in 1999, and other manufacturers in the former Soviet countries joined the trend in the early 2000s.

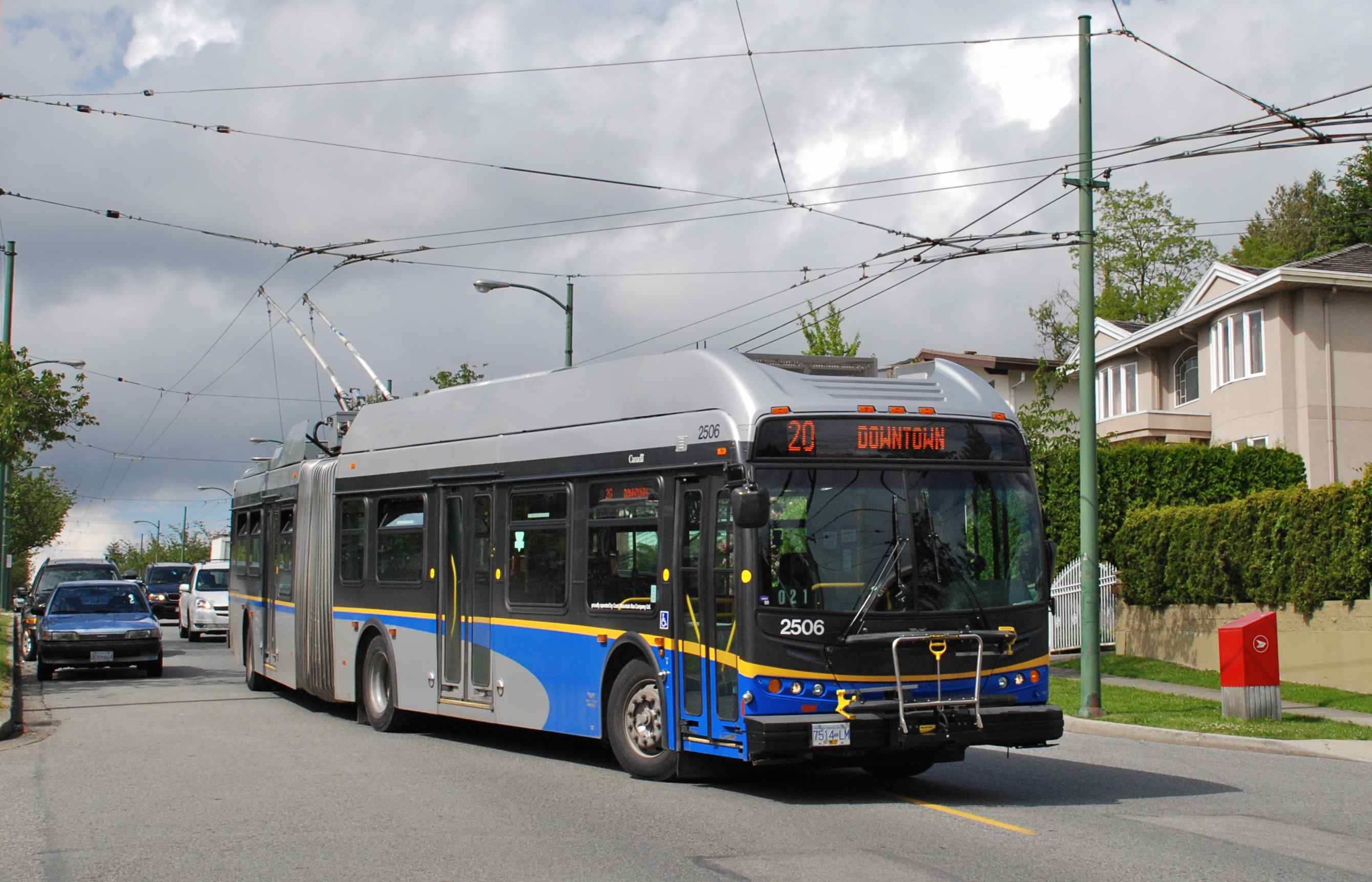
The Vancouver trolleybus system completed the transition to an exclusively low-floor fleet in 2009.

However, because the lifespan of a trolleybus is typically longer than that of a motorbus, the budget allocation and purchase typically factored in the longevity; the introduction of low-floor vehicles applied pressures on operators to retire high-floor trolleybuses that were only a few years old and replace them with low-floor trolleybuses. Responses varied, with some systems keeping their high-floor fleets, and others retiring them early but, in many instances, selling them second-hand for continued use in countries where there was a demand for low-cost second-hand trolleybuses, in particular in Romania and Bulgaria. The Lausanne system dealt with this dilemma in the 1990s by purchasing new low-floor passenger trailers to be towed by its high-floor trolleybuses, a choice later also made by Lucerne.

Outside Europe, 14 vehicles built by, and for, the Shanghai trolleybus system in mid-1999 were the first reported low-floor trolleybuses in Southeast Asia. Wellington, New Zealand, took delivery of its first low-floor trolleybus in March 2003, and by the end of 2009 had renewed its entire fleet with such vehicles. Unlike Europe, where low floor means "100%" low floor from front to back, most "low floor" buses on other continents are actually only low-entry or part-low floor.

In the Americas, the first low-floor trolleybus was a Busscar vehicle supplied to the São Paulo EMTU system in 2001. In North America, wheelchair lifts were again chosen for disabled access in new trolleybuses delivered to San Francisco in 1992–94, to Dayton in 1996–1999, and to Seattle in 2001–2002, but the first low-floor trolleybus was built in 2003, with the first of 28 Neoplan vehicles for the Boston system. Subsequently, the Vancouver system and the Philadelphia system have converted entirely to low-floor vehicles, and in 2013 the Seattle and Dayton systems both placed orders for their first low-floor trolleybuses. Outside São Paulo, almost all trolleybuses currently in service in Latin America are high-floor models built before 2000. However, in 2013, the first domestically manufactured low-floor trolleybuses were introduced in both Argentina and Mexico.

With regard to non-passenger aspects of vehicle design, the transition from high-floor to low-floor has meant that some equipment previously placed under the floor has been moved to the roof. Some transit operators have needed to modify their maintenance facilities to accommodate this change, a one-time expense.

== Double-decker trolleybuses ==
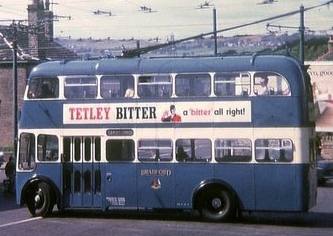
A trolleybus in Bradford in 1970. The Bradford Trolleybus system was the last one to operate in the United Kingdom; closing in 1972.

Since the end of 1997, no double-decker trolleybuses have been in service anywhere in the world, but, in the past, several manufacturers made such vehicles. Most builders of double-deck trolleybuses were in the United Kingdom, but there were a few, usually solitary, instances of such trolleybuses being built in other countries, including in Germany by Henschel (for Hamburg); in Italy, by Lancia (for Porto, Portugal); in Russia, by the Yaroslavl motor plant (for Moscow) and in Spain, by Maquitrans (for Barcelona). British manufacturers of double-deck trolleybuses included AEC, BUT, Crossley, Guy, Leyland, Karrier, Sunbeam and others.

In 2001, Citybus (Hong Kong) converted a Dennis Dragon (#701) into a double-decker trolleybus, and it was tested on a 300-metre track in Wong Chuk Hang in that year. Hong Kong decided not to build a trolleybus system, and the testing of this prototype did not lead to any further production of vehicles.

== Use and preservation ==
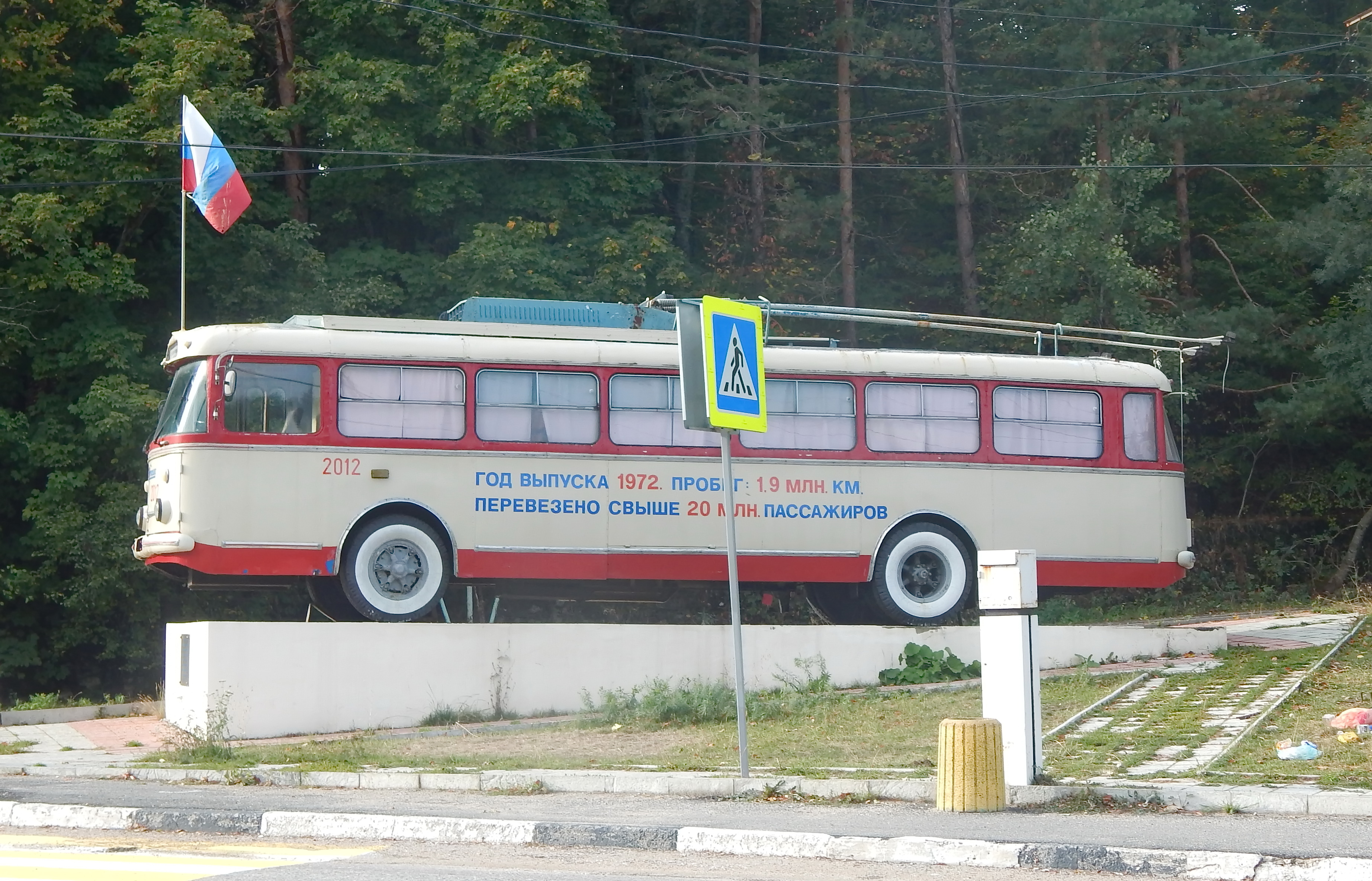
Monument to Crimean Trolleybus

There are currently around 260 cities or metropolitan areas where trolleybuses are operated, and more than 550 additional trolleybus systems have existed in the past. For an overview, by country, see Trolleybus usage by country, and for complete lists of trolleybus systems by location, with dates of opening and (where applicable) closure, see List of trolleybus systems and the related lists indexed there.

Of the systems existing as of 2012, the majority were located in Europe and Asia, including 85 in Russia and 43 in Ukraine. However, there were eight systems existing in North America and nine in South America. In 2025, the largest concentrations by region were the 85 systems in the Council of Europe countries (the European Union plus Switzerland and Norway), 75 in Russia, and 35 in Ukraine.

Trolleybuses have been preserved in most of the countries where they have operated. The United Kingdom has the largest number of preserved trolleybuses with more than 110, while the United States has around 70. Most preserved vehicles are on static display only, but a few museums are equipped with a trolleybus line, allowing trolleybuses to operate for visitors. Museums with operational trolleybus routes include three in the UK – the Trolleybus Museum at Sandtoft, the East Anglia Transport Museum, and the Black Country Living Museum – and three in the United States – the Illinois Railway Museum, the Seashore Trolley Museum, and the Shore Line Trolley Museum – but operation of trolleybuses does not necessarily occur on a regular schedule of dates at these museums.

== See also ==
- Battery electric bus
- Bus rapid transit
- Dual-mode bus
- Electric bus
- Electric vehicle battery
- Electromote
- Guided bus
- Gyrobus
- List of trolleybus manufacturers
- List of current operating trolleybus systems
- List of trolleybus systems
- Parallel overhead lines
- Traction substation
- Trolleytruck
