= 1998 Shenyang trolleybus electrocution accident =

Trolleybus incident in Shenyang, China

Shenyang trolleybus electrocution incident

Details
- Date: 1998-08-12; 11:50
- Location: Shenyang, Liaoning Province, China
- Cause: accidental electrocution due to connection with 11kV cable

Statistics
- Vehicles: 1 articulated trolleybus
- Deaths: 5 or 6
- Injured: 2 or 9

The Shenyang trolleybus electrocution accident is an overhead power line electrocution accident involving public transport in Shenyang, the capital city of Liaoning province, Northeast China. The accident happened at 15:50 on August 12, 1998, when a trolley pole on a trolleybus stopping at a bus stop in the central Shenhe District slipped off the trolley wires and contacted an uninsulated 11kV high-voltage cable. The vehicle then became electrically charged and electric discharge happened whenever passengers stepped off, resulting in 5 deaths and 9 injuries. This accident had a devastating consequence to the trolleybus operations in Shenyang, ultimately resulting in the complete removal of the city's long-running trolleybus network.

== Background ==
Prior to the closure of the trolleybus network in Shenyang, it was the third largest trolleybus network in China, although in 1995 it was the largest by kilometre count of trolley wires, but second behind Shanghai in total vehicle count. In May 1999, after a number of reductions, there was a total of 12 lines, 4 depots and more than 400 trolleybuses. At its peak, there were about 20 routes.

=== Similar prior incidents ===
- On 20 July 1993, at 11:50, a trolleybus on route 8 had one of its poles disconnect from the trolley wire and lodged onto a roadside pole. As it was stuck tight, a number of passengers tried to free it by pushing the trolleybus. When the pole was freed, it sprang up and connected to a high voltage wire, instantly killing 2 and injuring 3, with the driver's leg being burnt.

== Accident ==
An articulated trolleybus was traveling on the loop route and approaching Wuai Street stop, when the trolley pole fell off the wire and connected onto a high voltage line, causing the trolleybus body to conduct electricity. As the electrical equipment behind the driver overheated and started smoking, panicking passengers saw the opportunity to leave through the opened doors. At the time, it was raining, so there was little electrical resistance and passengers were instantly electrocuted when their foot touched the ground, completing a connection between the trolleybus body and the ground. However, sources differ on whether the passengers disembarked due to smoke from the electrical equipment, or the passengers got off without knowing of the high voltage flowing through the trolleybus body; the number of deaths also differ, being either 5 or 6. The power was cut after 5 minutes. The 11 kV line was illegally connected by nearby construction workers on Wenhua Road, who had placed it above the trolley wires.

== Aftermath ==
With the closure of the Shenyang trolleybus, many other cities in the north-east region of China followed. The campaign of converting 'Electricity to Gas' (Chinese: 电改汽) was initiated with the aim of closing all trolleybus lines in favour of diesel buses had support from the media. News reports had not mentioned the illegally connected cable and instead concluded that 'trolleybuses are old antiques' and Mu Suixin, when visiting the injured, said that trolleybuses must be made obsolete. On the day after the accident, various city affiliated media reported on the 'revolution of public transport' through dismantling the trolleybus network.

The reasons given consisted of the following points:

1. With a network length of 125 km powered by 40 substations built in the 1950s and 60s, it would require an urgent update estimated at a cost of 0.3 billion RMB; 422 trolleybuses were also becoming outdated and in need of replacement.
2. The trolleybus network required too much upkeep and with the increase in electricity costs, it was estimated that by replacing trolleybuses with buses could save 3.8 million RMB in operating costs.
3. Trolleybuses had a low operating efficiency: they only ran at an average speed of 11.2 km/h while buses ran at 13.1 km/h and would provide a better service to citizens.
4. Trolleybuses were an inconvenience if they disconnected from the contact wire, and would require the conductor to reconnect the poles manually.

An additional reason given was that trolleybus infrastructure causes visual pollution, 'causes electrocution incidents' and the unstable voltages caused unreliable services. However, according to workers of the transport department, there were only 13 substations and most of them were built in the 1970s and 1980s. Later on, they were continuously upgraded and were not outdated, and neither was the contact network.

Despite claims of outdated vehicles, part of the fleet was relatively new, having served only 3–7 years and most trolleybuses were built in 1995–1996, had a national standard of 10 years of service and could run at 50 km/h. 350 trolleybuses would be sold to other cities, such as Harbin and Zhengzhou. There was support for this government plan to demolish trolleybuses, as the government had for many years provided insufficient maintenance to the contact network, which led to citizens believing that the trolleybus was indeed an inefficient mode of transport with the trolley poles constantly disconnecting showing its apparent inefficiency. Trolleybuses were similarly poorly maintained, due to the operational model where trolleybuses were leased to drivers, which encouraged drivers not to send their vehicles to major overhauls, and with the insufficient repairs conducted by drivers, trolleybuses usually ran at slow speeds with faults that contributed to the negatives perceived by citizens, though initially, the plan was well received in improving efficiency. Through the 'Electricity to Gas' program, the city administration was able to receive funding from higher up and would allow an increase in income.

The trolleybus was declared an obsolete form of transport and trolleybuses service in Shenyang ended at 22:30, 19 June 1999 when the last route 10 car terminated.

The mayor of Shenyang at the time was Mu Suixin, who in 2002 was sentenced to death sentence with reprieve over corruption. He was known for being aggressive in arguments and abusing his position of power. When debating about canceling the trolleybus, he strongly suggested a manager of city transportation to find the 'good' about converting to diesel buses, and not to list reasons why not to convert. Under his plan, the wide-reaching trolleybus network was replaced by 545 expensive buses, which contributed to worsening air quality in Shenyang. Although replacements were promised to be natural gas buses conforming to Euro emission standards, 80% were much more polluting diesel buses. On 10 October 2001, he was sentenced to death with reprieve with confiscation of all property, although he died of liver cancer in 2003.

Xia Renfan also played a role in the removal of the trolleybus; in the spring of 1998, he became the head of the transportation department of the city through bribing Mu Suixin with US$10000, 'resolving' the objections to his appointment by others in the transportation department and Mu Suixin, even though Mu Suixin had realised that his reputation was poor, was untrusted and was rejected numerous times by the city committee. Satisfied with the bribe, Mu Suixin bypassed the committee by moving the passenger transport company from being under the city transportation department to an enterprise directly controlled by the city. He allocated generous funds to Xia Renfan for the 'modification' to the trolleybus network. From then on, much of the funds were used on renting a total of 2078 Mu of land, supposedly for retirement. He also received bribes from a bus manufacturer in Nanjing of around 20000 RMB, as 'a gift from the factory'. On another occasion, a bribe of 100,000 RMB was given for the purchase of 200 buses. In total, through misuse of public funds, bribery and corruption, Xia Renfan had illegally received over 300,000,000 RMB. In 2003, he was sentenced by the Liaoning Higher People's Court to death, although in 2005 his sentenced was reduced by the Supreme People's Court to death sentence with reprieve because he reported another high-ranking official.

Although demolished for many years, the trolleybus still remains a widely known symbol of Shenyang.
