= Trolleybuses in Tours =

Former public transport network in Tours, France

Tours trolleybus system
- Vétra VBRh in TRT colors.

Overview
- Owner: Syndicat des transports de la région tourangelle (TRT)
- Locale: Tours, France
- Transit type: Trolleybus
- Number of lines: 3

Operation
- Began operation: October 5, 1949
- Ended operation: June 30, 1968
Map of the system in 1952

The Tours trolleybus system is a former urban public transport network that was operated with trolleybuses in the French city of Tours and three of its neighboring communes. The network extended to the west to La Riche, to the north to Saint-Cyr-sur-Loire, and to the east to Saint-Pierre-des-Corps.

The trolleybus network, comprising three lines, commenced operation in early October 1949. The trolleybus network replaced a portion of the former Tours tramway network, which had been reorganized at the beginning of the 20th century, extensively damaged by World War II, and out of service since September 14, 1949. Other lines were served by buses. The trolleybus network underwent a period of gradual expansion and high frequency of service in the early 1960s. By 1963, trolleybuses accounted for over 60% of public transport users in Tours. At its peak, the network had at most 22 vehicles. However, the network was rapidly dismantled beginning in 1964 and ceased operations on June 30, 1968. Following this, urban public transport in the Tours metropolitan area was provided solely by buses (until 2013, when a new tram system opened).

Tours' decision to implement a trolleybus system following the conclusion of World War II and subsequently terminate it two decades later was not an isolated occurrence. A comparable sequence of events transpired in approximately twenty major French cities during a similar time frame.

== History ==
=== Replacement of tramways ===
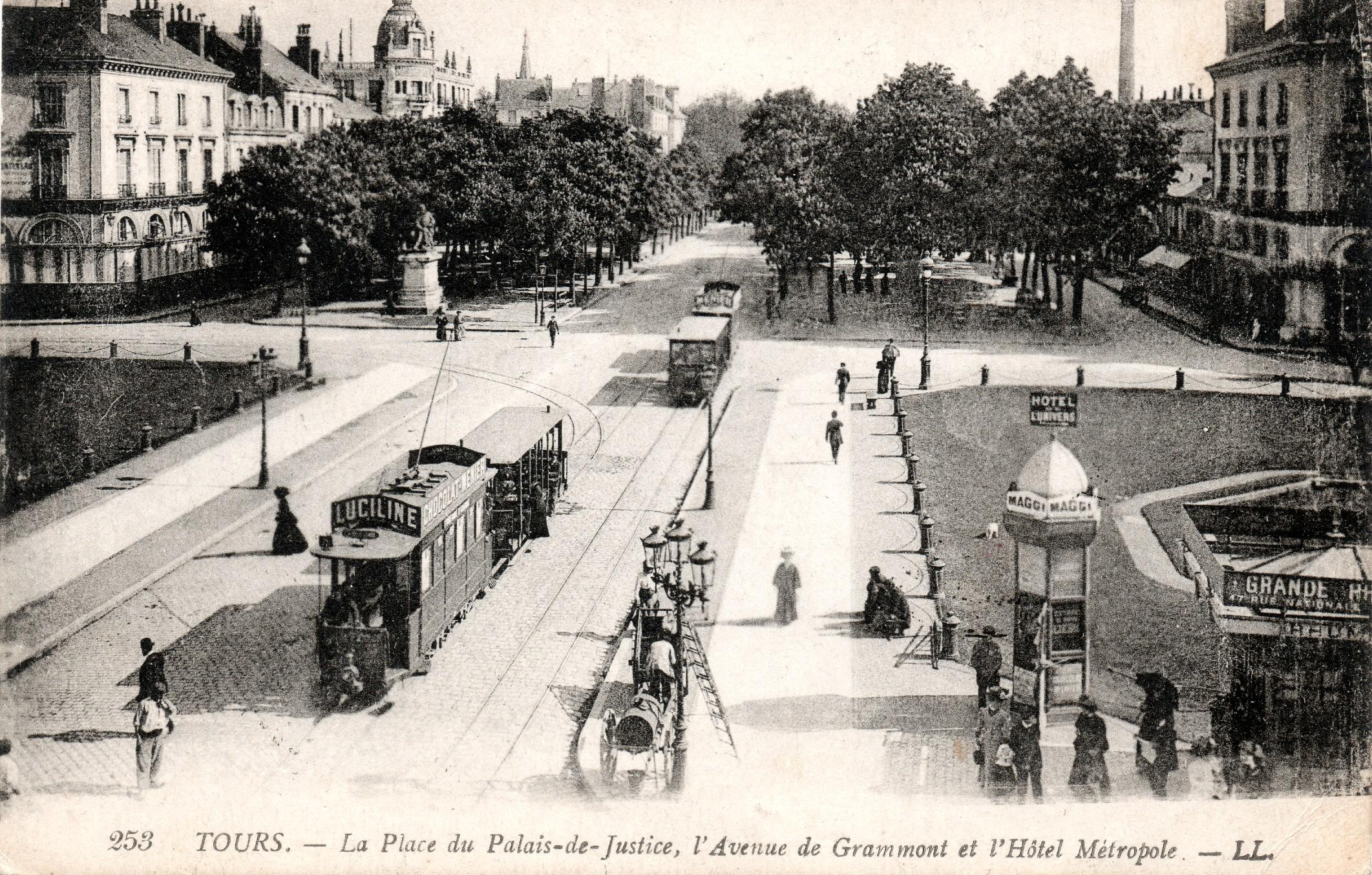
Tours tramway in 1910

Due to the obsolescence of its electric tramways, the first of which had been deployed in 1900, Tours began planning a new public transportation network in 1939, which would integrate buses and trolleybuses. Vétra, the manufacturer, offered modern trolleybuses that were, at the time, state-of-the-art. They were quiet, comfortable, and free of vibrations, and their low floor facilitated access. In every way, they outperformed the old electric tram cars. The Second World War accelerated the process, resulting in the development of a technical and financial project in 1941 to address the difficulties associated with operating buses and trams. The project aimed to convert 38.5 km of urban and suburban lines, which were then in operation, to trolleybuses. This was due to the challenges posed by the wartime shortage of liquid fuel and the damage caused to infrastructure and equipment by the conflict.

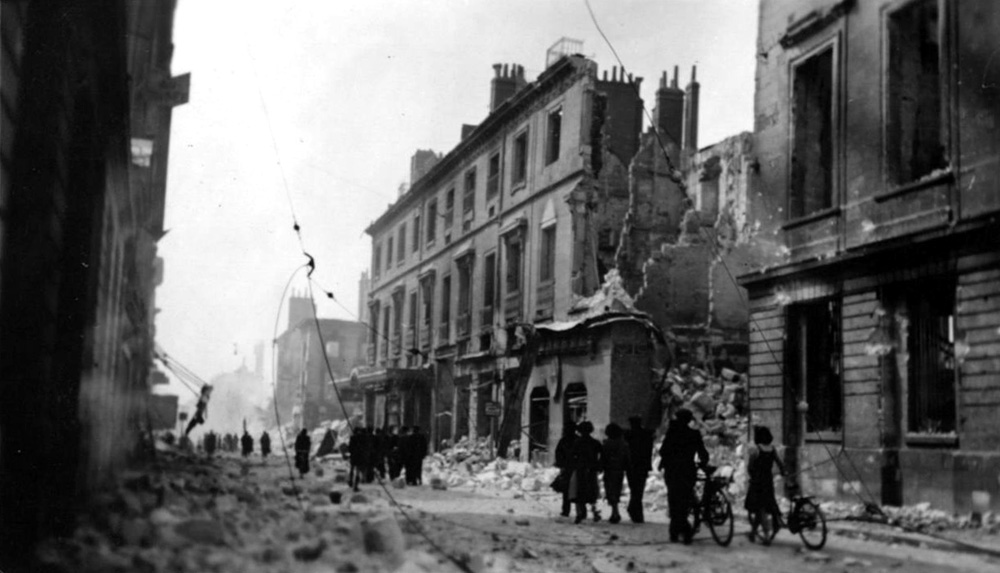
Rue Nationale (Tours) in 1940

After the conflict, the tramway fleet had only 12 operational motor cars, a number insufficient for the normal operation of the entire network, which required 30 cars. The infrastructure had sustained significant damage. In 1940, the city was split in two by the bridge destruction over the Loire, resulting in damage to lines and the destruction of the depot. Liquid fuel rationing (gasoline and diesel) remained in effect until 1949. Pneumatic vehicles and electric motors were seen as a viable solution, with the 1941 project serving as the foundation for the subsequent design of the new network, which was considerably less ambitious. On October 14, 1947, a trolleybus was unveiled to the public at Jean-Jaurès Square. The final Tours tram ran on September 14, 1949. (Trams were reintroduced in 2013.) For almost a month, buses provided a replacement service while awaiting the trolleybuses' full operational status. In the aftermath of the Second World War, the tramway was perceived as an anachronism, a symbol of a "bygone era" associated with the war years. It was considered a danger to automobile and bicycle traffic, and its demise was viewed as a positive development.

=== Dynamic network ===
On October 5, 1949, the inaugural ceremony for trolleybus line B took place, marking the completion of work that had commenced the previous May. The route followed much of the former tramway line B's path. Trolleybuses were operated with two crew members: a driver and a conductor stationed near the rear door where passengers boarded. Between 1947 and 1952, twelve trolleybus networks were put into service in France.

The Electric and Industrial Operations, which had operated the Tours tramway network until 1949, served as the managing entity for the newly established public transportation network on behalf of the Syndicate of Transport for the Tours Region (TRT), which was the proprietor of the network.

The network assigned to trolleybuses consisted of three lines, created in 1949 (B and B1) and 1952 (C). One of them (B1) was extended at both ends in 1955 and 1963. The trolleybus fleet experienced a notable expansion to meet the growing demand, increasing from twelve vehicles in 1952 to twenty-two in 1963. Trolleybus ridership reached its peak in 1963, transporting 5.6 million passengers, out of a total of 9 million for the entire network. Buses were more specifically used for the suburban lines. In the early 1960s, this mode of transportation was well-developed nationally, with 25 trolleybus networks active in France. The majority of these networks were established between 1942 and 1952.

=== Abrupt reversal of fortune ===
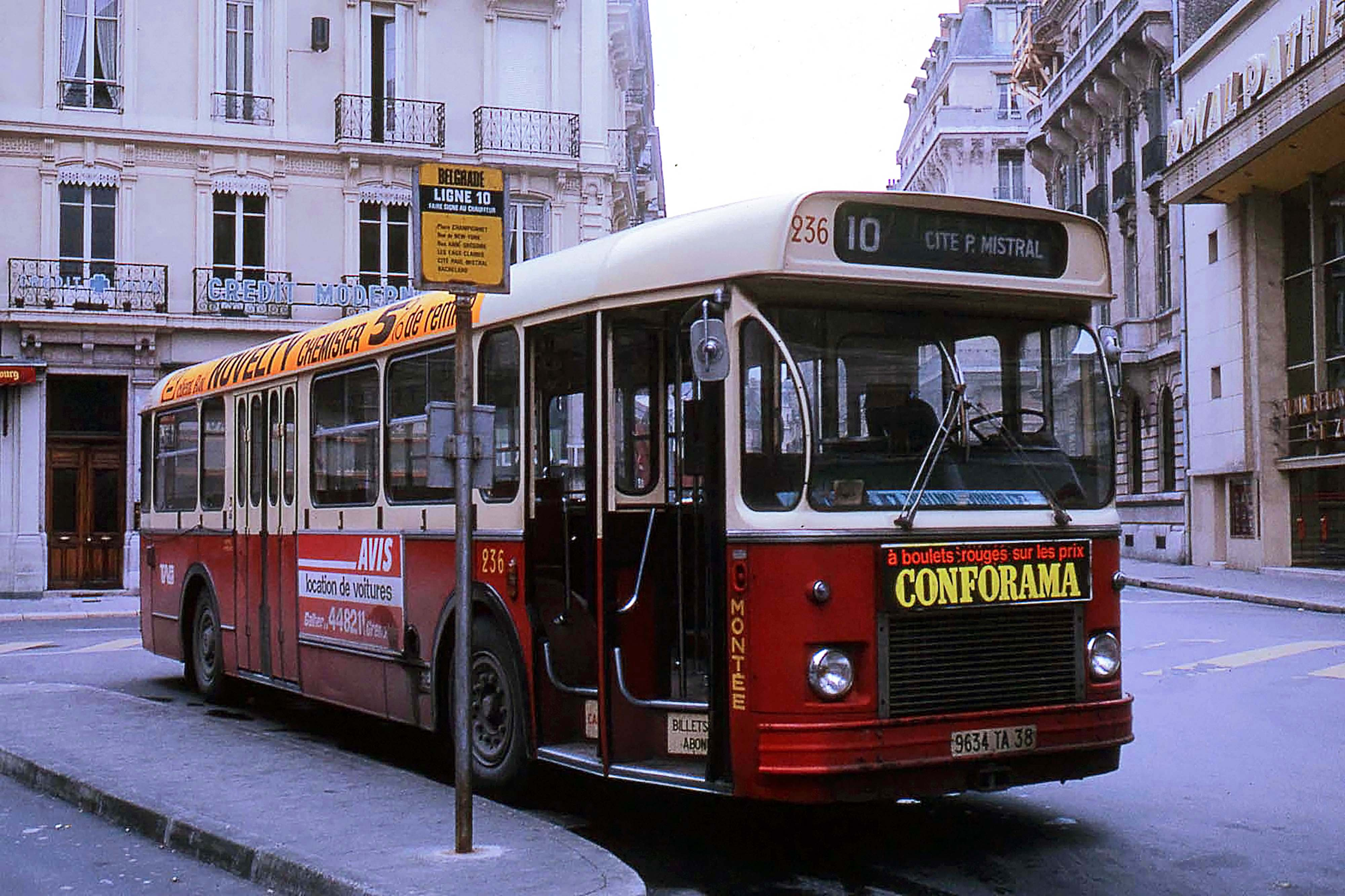
SAVIEM SC10 (Grenoble)

However, by the end of 1963, just months after the final line extension, the prospective viability of the trolleybus system in Tours appeared to be jeopardized. The rapid development of the Tours metropolitan area (Note: The population of Tours increased from 107,544 to 128,120 between 1962 and 1968.) necessitated an extension and redesign of the public transport networks, as well as significant roadworks. These limitations, particularly the fixed trolley lines requiring maintenance, were seen as incompatible with the evolving network. The network's power substation, installed in 1932 during the tramway era, needed replacement. Of the twenty-two trolleybuses, thirteen could not be adapted for single-operator service due to the absence of a front overhang door. This was despite the TRT's desire to implement this change to reduce labor costs. The staff, however, still demanded the maintenance of two operators, primarily to assist with the frequent detachment of the trolley poles, particularly at terminals.

Trends in the length of trolleybus routes

The three lines underwent partial modification, with traffic in select terminal sectors transferred to bus services. Trolleybuses were introduced to serve only the "central part" of the line. This resulted in a transfer for passengers, necessitating a change in mode of transport during their journey. The vehicles were decommissioned one by one, and the last trolleybus ran on June 30, 1968. At this point, only four units remained in service, with buses already handling the majority of runs on the same lines. From this point forward, Tours' public transport was exclusively provided by buses, with 65 in service in 1968. The copper contact wires were quickly dismantled and sold at a good price. (Note: The global price of copper exhibited an average annual growth rate of 10% between 1945 and 1975.)

This disappearance occurred in a national context that was highly unfavorable to trolleybuses. The circumstances surrounding this event were comparable in scale to the rejection of trams that had occurred twenty years earlier, though for different reasons. In most French cities, the trolleybus and its fixed installations were perceived as impediments to the expansion of public transport networks. This was because these networks were already facing challenges as a result of the increasing prevalence of private vehicles, coupled with the relatively low fuel cost at the time. Furthermore, the introduction of traffic management plans in response to the growth in road traffic, which included the implementation of one-way streets, led to the costly relocation of fixed installations. By the mid-1960s, trolleybuses had become so robust that they were no longer replaced. The lack of sufficient market demand to sustain design studios meant that their technology had not evolved since the 1940s. Furthermore, Vétra, the main manufacturer, went bankrupt in 1964. Furthermore, trolleybuses encountered direct competition with the introduction of the SC10 bus by SAVIEM in 1965. This vehicle offered enhanced flexibility, and comfort, and was originally designed for single-operator service. From 1965 to 1973, thirteen urban trolleybus networks were terminated in the provinces. Most of these closures were initiated and executed before the implementation of the fifth plan (1966-1970), which sought to revitalize public transportation networks, and before the first oil crisis in 1973, which rekindled economic interest in electric energy.

== Lines ==
1963

1965

Evolution of the Tours trolleybus network

The trolleybus network of Tours comprised three lines, the first two of which could be regarded as branches of a single line with a common trunk. The network was structured around east-west and north-south routes, with all lines intersecting and connecting at Jean-Jaurès Square. The lines were equipped with either four (two traffic lanes) or two contact wires (one lane), supplied with direct current at a voltage of 600 V, depending on the sections, the expected traffic, and the topographical constraints. The trolleybuses used the roadways shared with other vehicles, with no lanes reserved for them. The declaration of public utility occurred only after the lines were effectively put into service.

Line B linked Botanique to Stalingrad, encompassing a distance of 6.8 kilometers. (Note: The mentioned value represents the maximum length of the line after possible extensions. However, it does not reflect, from 1964, the length operated by trolleybuses.) The initial designation of the western terminus, "Abattoirs" (slaughterhouses), was deemed disparaging, particularly given its proximity to a hospital. Consequently, it was renamed "Botanique" in 1951 or 1952, without any alteration to its geographical location. At the opposite end, the terminus was located at Stalingrad Square (later renamed Beaujardin Square on April 23, 1965). In approximately 1964, the reconstruction of a railway bridge beneath which the line traversed led to the removal of the contact wires and the southern branch beyond Loiseau-d'Entraigues Square was transferred to bus transportation.

Line B1 ran from Saint-Pierre (stadium) to La Riche (Les Sables), covering a distance of 8.2 kilometers. The initial configuration of Line B consisted of a brief western branch, measuring 900 meters in length, extending from Sainte-Anne Square to the church of La Riche. Subsequently, the line was extended eastward, reaching the Saint-Pierre-des-Corps stadium in 1955, as soon as repairs to the city, which had sustained 80% destruction from allied bombings in April 1944, were completed. In September 1963, the line was extended westward to the new Les Sables district. The trolleybus service to Saint-Pierre-des-Corps was terminated in 1964 when the construction of the A10 highway resulted in the line's severance, and a rebuilt bridge was not equipped with contact wires. Consequently, the trolleybuses ceased operation at Loiseau-d'Entraigues Square, which provided a loop facility for trolleybuses to turn around. Beyond this point, buses assumed responsibility for the remaining route.

Line C constituted a north-south transverse line, extending from Saint-Cyr (Charentais) to Parc Nord and encompassing a distance of 5.9 km. The commercial operation commenced on December 8, 1952, following the reconstruction of the Wilson Bridge over the Loire and the clearance of war ruins from Rue Nationale, thus restoring communication between the north and south of Tours. The completion of development work at the end of 1963 resulted in the trolleybus route being limited to two sections. The first was to the south at the Verdun crossroads, situated close to the former tollhouse (creation of a crossroads beyond the Cher). The second was to the north on Tranchée Avenue, extending towards Saint-Cyr (road widening).In 1964 or 1965, the entire line was replaced by buses. However, the contact wires and their electrical supply remained on Grammont Avenue until the end of the network's operation. This was so that vehicles from other lines could return to the depot located in the southern part of this avenue. This was the former tramway depot rebuilt after World War II. It also housed the network's electrical supply equipment.

Due to the phased introduction of the network and the subsequent removal of certain sections, the trolleybus network in Tours was only fully operational for a brief period in 1963, with a maximum extension of nearly 21 km of lines.

Termini of lines or sections of lines operated by trolleybuses

== Fleet ==
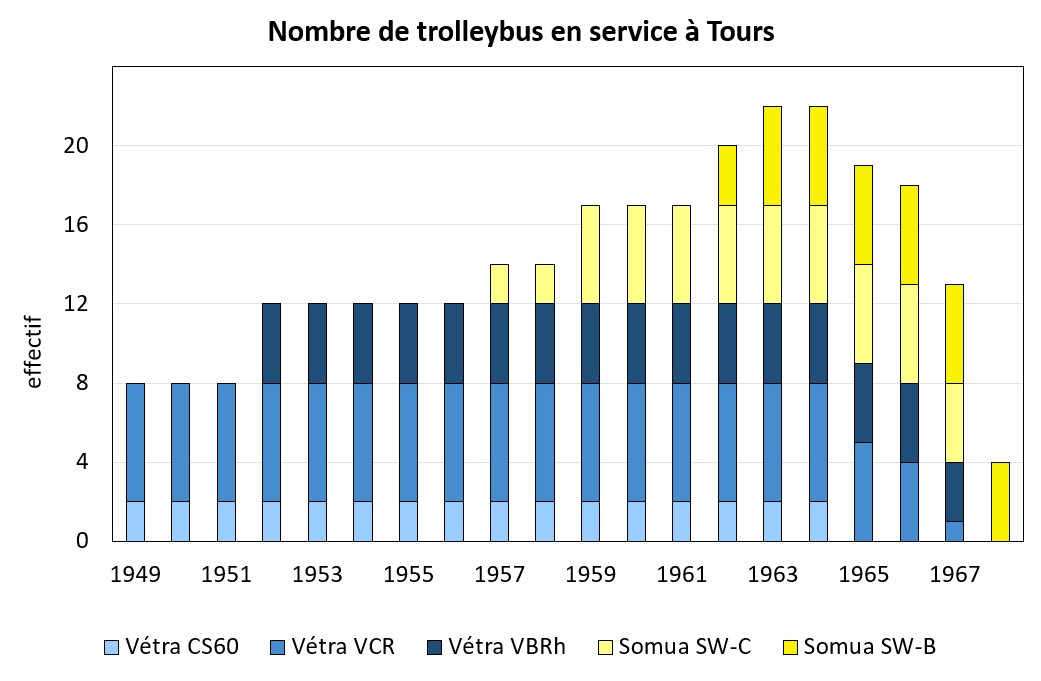
Makeup of the Tours trolleybus fleet by model

The initial trolleybuses were delivered to Tours in August and September of 1948, with some of them ordered as early as 1943. They were subsequently put into service in October 1949. The vehicles were eight Vétra models of two similar types, each with a capacity of 60 passengers. They included six VCRs (fleet numbers 61 to 65 and 68) (Note: To promote vehicle standardization, a government decree of November 5, 1942, defined four types (A, B, C, and D) for future trolleybuses based on their size and capacity.) and two CS60s (66 and 67). They were initially intended for the Brest network, also managed by Electric and Industrial Operations. In December 1952, four additional Vétra VBRh models (71 to 74) were introduced, offering a greater passenger capacity of approximately 80 individuals.

In 1956 and 1958, five Somua SW-C models (numbers 81 to 85) were added to the Tours fleet. (Note: The acronym SW represents the Schneider-Westinghouse company, established in 1929 as an equal joint venture between Schneider Electric and Westinghouse Electric Company. The company designed the electrical equipment for trolleybuses, while Somua was responsible for manufacturing the bodies and mechanical parts.) The 60-seat trolleybuses were initially intended for the Algerian network in Constantine. The last trolleybuses were delivered to Tours in 1962-1963. These were five Somua SW-B (86 to 90) with a capacity of 90 passengers. They were acquired under favorable financial conditions from the Strasbourg network, which ceased trolleybus operations at the end of March 1962.

At its zenith in 1963 and 1964, the fleet encompassed 22 vehicles from two manufacturers (12 Vétra and 10 Somua) comprising five distinct models. Of these, 17 were purchased new, while the remaining five were acquired secondhand. All the delivered trolleybuses remained in service. The initial vehicles to be introduced to the network were those that remained in service for the longest period (VCRs delivered in 1949 and withdrawn in 1967). In May 1964, except for the SW-Cs, which had only traveled between 170,000 and 300,000 kilometers, all other trolleybuses had accumulated between 500,000 and 700,000 kilometers.

None of the sources consulted provide information on the fate of Tours' trolleybuses after their decommissioning, scrapping, or resale.

Models of Trolleybuses Operating in Tours

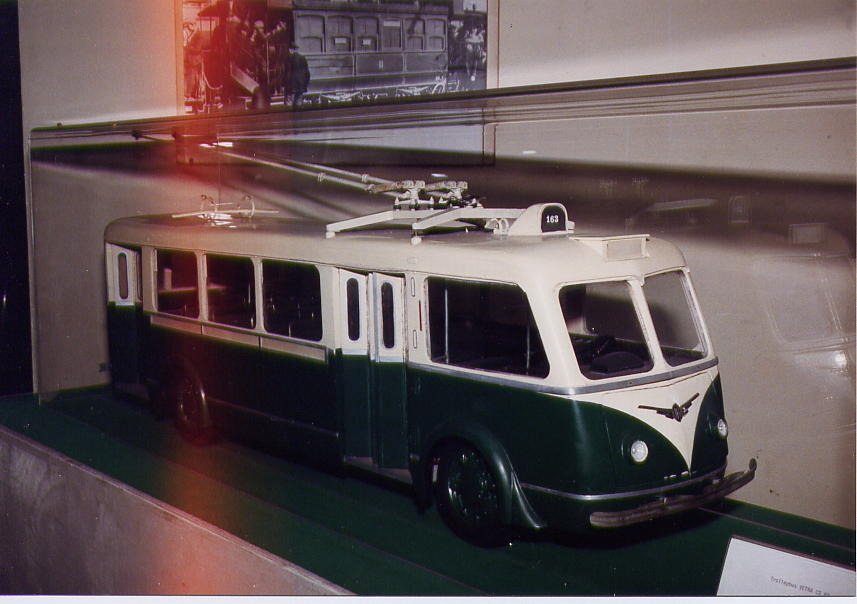
Vétra CS60 (mock-up)

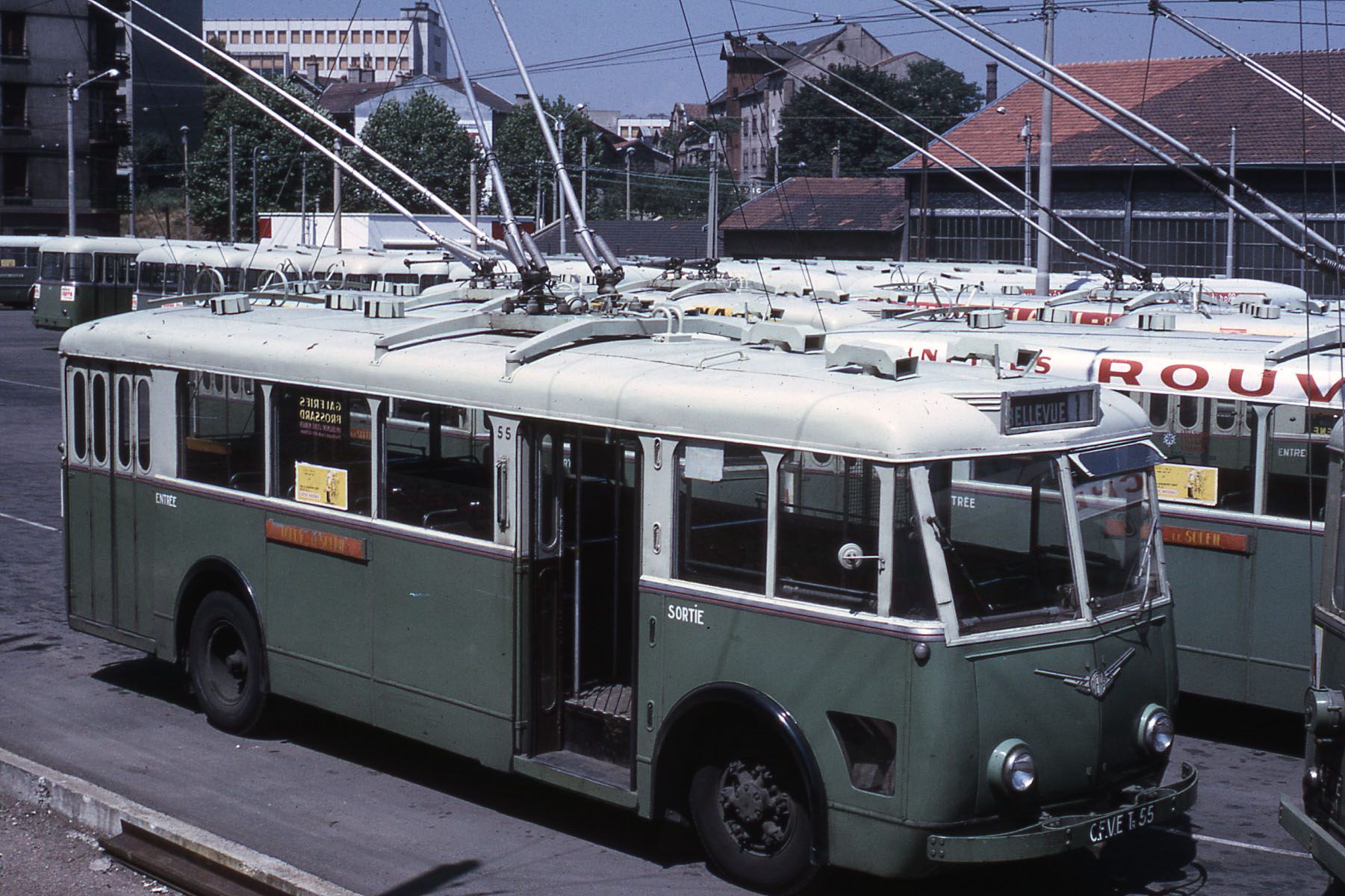
Vétra VCR (Saint-Étienne)

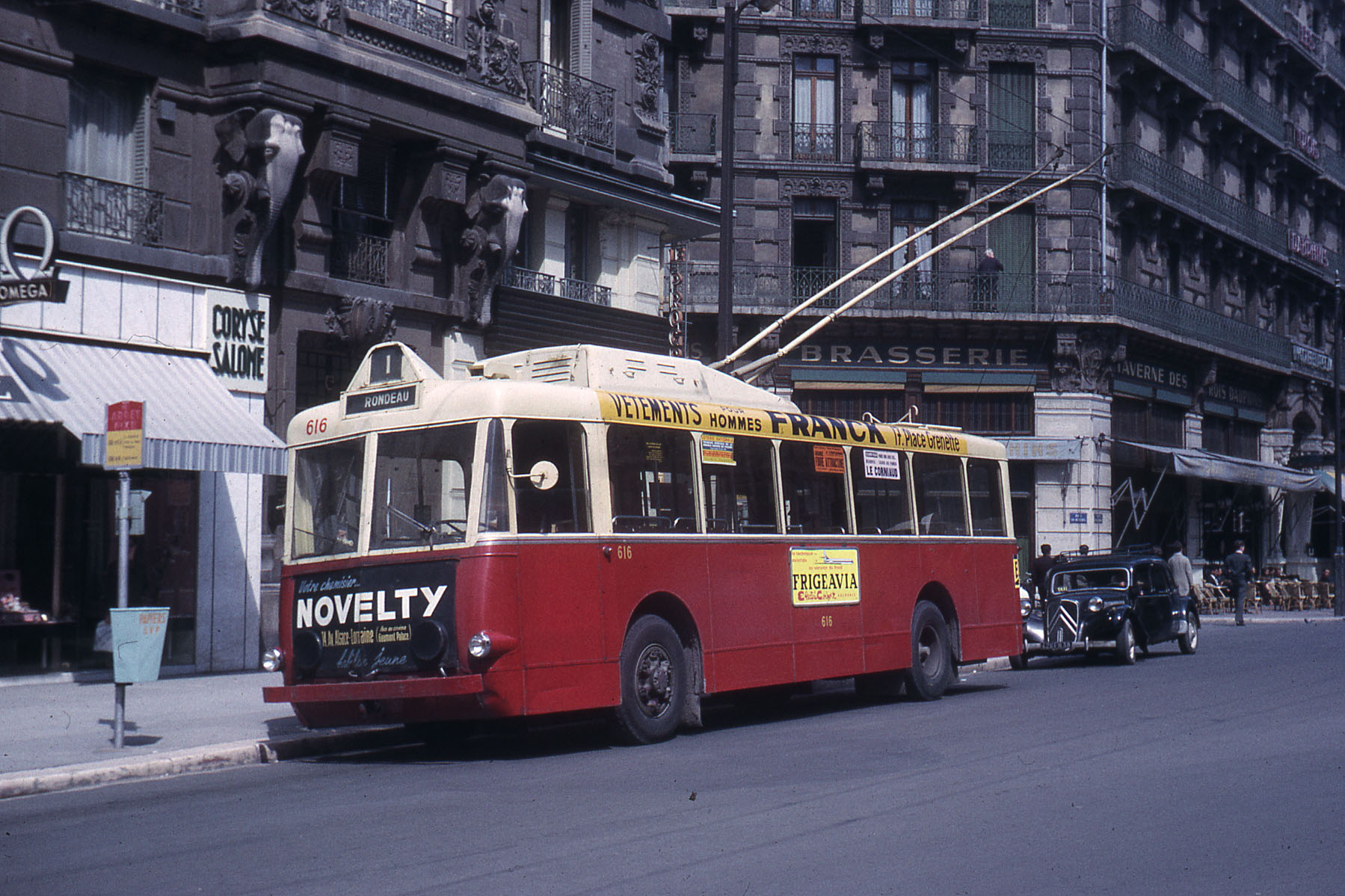
Vétra VBRh (Grenoble)

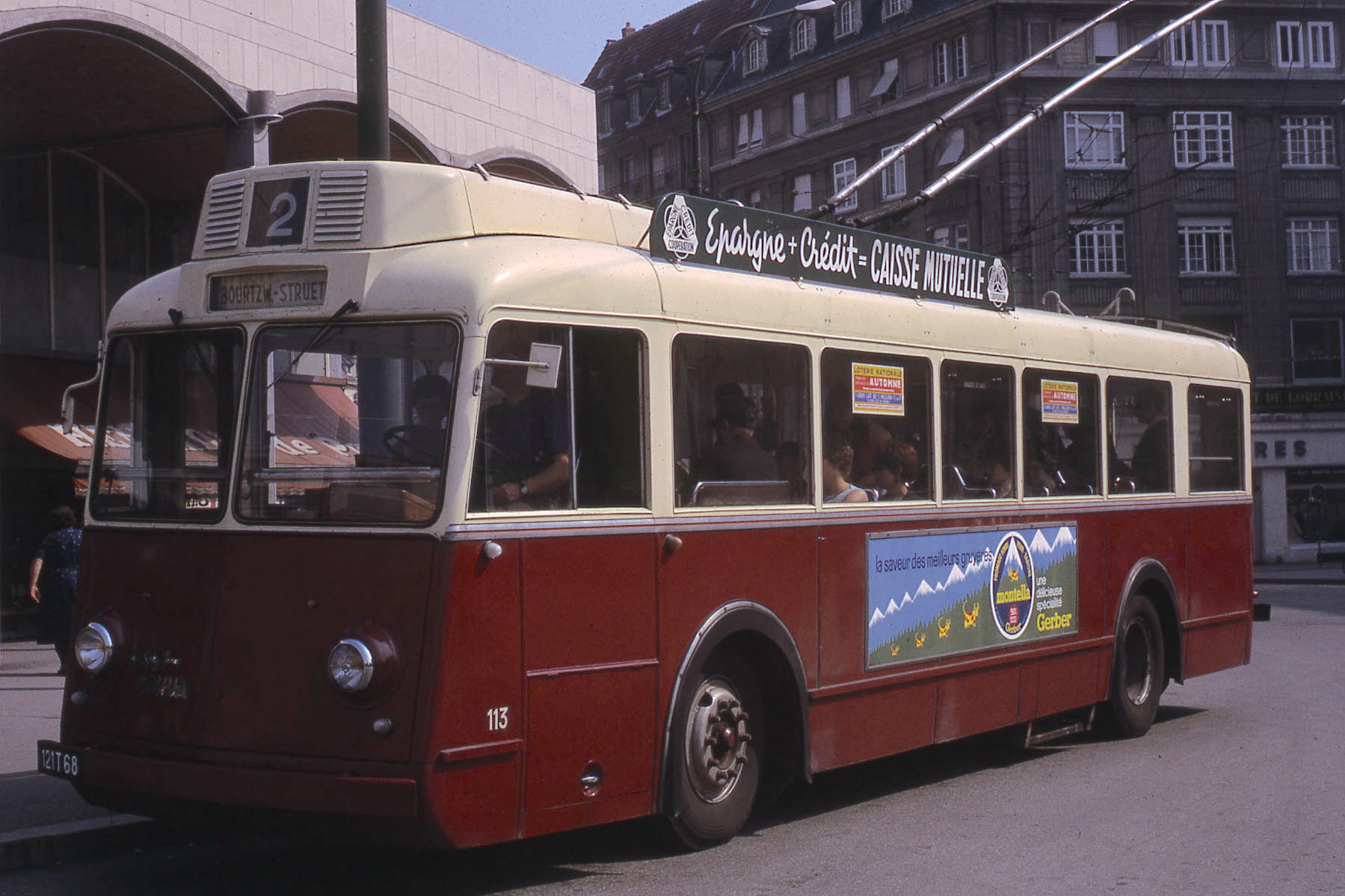
Somua SW-B (Mulhouse)

== See also ==
- List of trolleybus systems in France
- Beaujardin
- Quartier Montjoyeux

== Bibliography ==
- Courant, René; Bejui, Pascal (1985). Les trolleybus français (in French). Grenoble: Presses et éditions ferroviaires. ISBN 978-2-9054-4701-2.
- Croubois, Claude (1986). L'Indre-et-Loire – La Touraine, des origines à nos jours. L’histoire par les documents (in French). Saint-Jean-d’Angely: Bordessoules. ISBN 2-9035-0409-1.
- Émangard, Pierre-Henri (1983a). "Cinquante ans de trolleybus en France". La Vie du Rail magazine (in French) (1878): 49–52.
- Émangard, Pierre-Henri (1983b). "Cinquante ans de trolleybus en France". La Vie du Rail magazine (in French) (1879): 41–44.
- Porhel, Jean-Luc (2013). Tours. Mémoires du tramway (in French). Tours: Archives municipales. ISBN 978-2-9079-3518-0.
- Robert, Jean (1974). Histoire des transports dans les villes de France (in French). Jean Robert. ISBN 2-9088-1689-X.
