= Ancien tramway de Tours =

Former tramway network in Tours, France

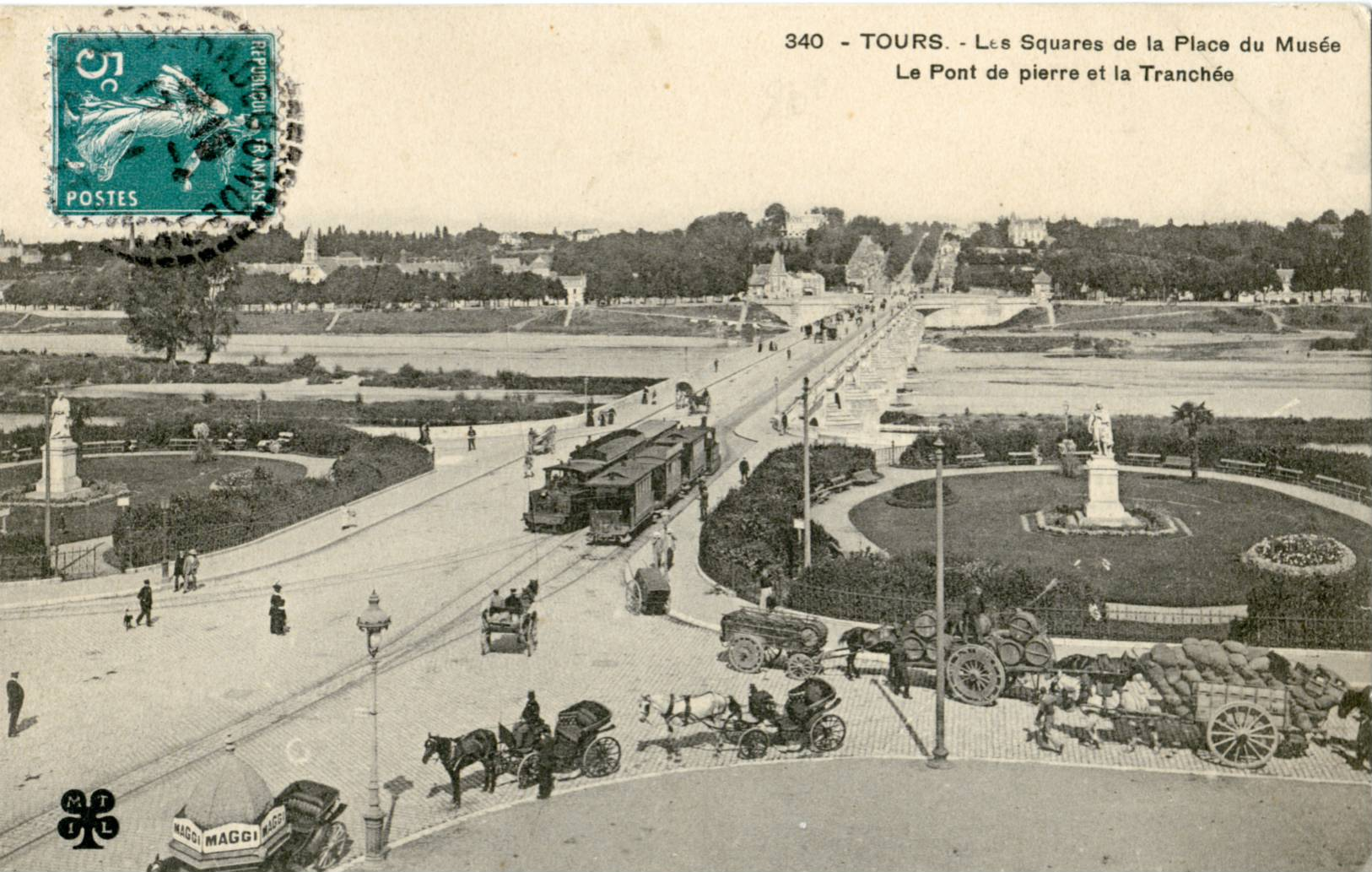
- Tramway crossing at the entrance to Pont Wilson

Overview
- Native name: Ancien tramway de Tours
- Locale: Tours, Indre-et-Loire, Centre-Val de Loire, France
- Transit type: Tramway
- Number of lines: 5 urban, 4 suburban

Operation
- Began operation: July 8, 1877
- Ended operation: September 14, 1949
- Operator: Compagnie générale française des tramways (1877–1898) Compagnie des tramways de Tours (1898–1949)

Technical
- System length: 20 km (12 mi) (1900)
- Track gauge: 1,000 mm (3 ft 3 3/8 in) (metric, after 1900) 1,435 mm (4 ft 8 1/2 in) (standard, initially)
- Electrification: Horse-drawn (1877–1900) Steam (1889–1912) Electric (1896–1949)
Evolution of railway infrastructure in Tours

The Ancien tramway de Tours was a former urban and suburban tramway network serving the Tours metropolitan area in Indre-et-Loire, France, and its surrounding regions from 1877 to 1949. Initially powered by horse or steam traction depending on the line, it combined urban and suburban networks and was converted to electric traction between 1900 and 1914. A modern tramway network, planned since the 1990s, began operations in the summer of 2013.

Animated map showing the evolution of railway infrastructure in the Tours metropolitan area, including former and current tramways, from 1875 to the present.

== History ==
=== Project launch in 1874 ===
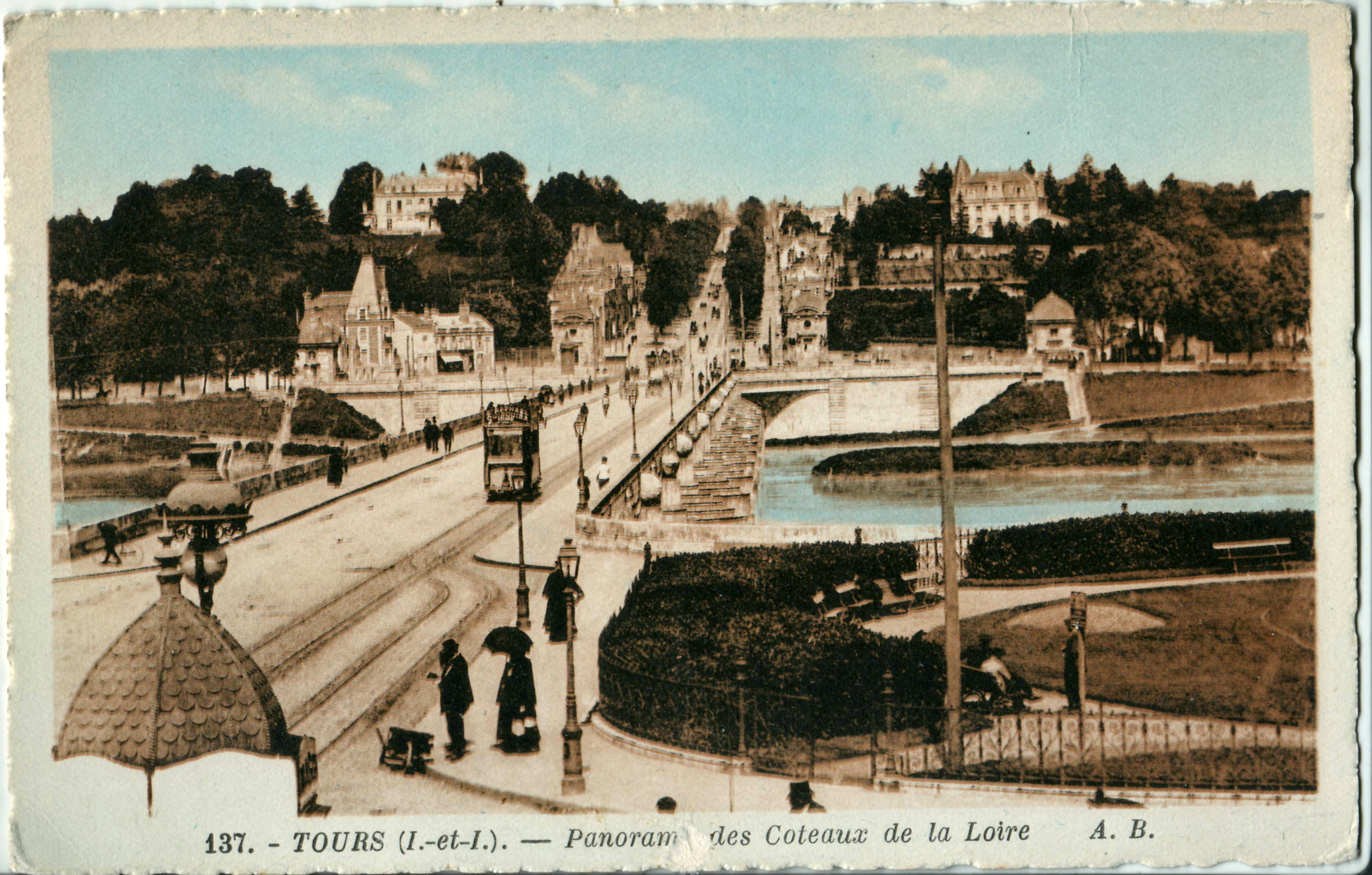
Siding at the entrance to Pont Wilson.

In 1874, Mayor of Tours Eugène Goüin, nearing the end of his term, sought to initiate a tramway project. Two companies submitted bids: Frédéric de la Hault, founder of the Compagnie générale française des tramways, sent proposals on 21 August, and Léon Marsillon, representing the Compagnie des tramways du Nord, submitted his on 9 September.

On 12 October 1874, both candidates met with the municipal tramway commission. The operator was selected based on the overall budget, requiring a deposit partially refunded upon completion of construction and an annual fee per tramcar. In return, the operator collected ticket revenues.

In 1875, Dieudonné Belle was elected mayor. On 23 April 1875, the official decision was announced, and on 25 July, Frédéric de la Hault was granted a 40-year tramway concession. He provided a 50000 franc deposit and an annual fee of 300 francs per tramcar.

=== Inauguration of the horse-drawn tramway ===
On 8 July 1877, at 9:00 a.m., municipal officials boarded a flag-decorated tramcar and toured the lines. For the rest of the day, large crowds used the new transport, with all tramcars at full capacity. The following day, Le Journal d’Indre-et-Loire reported on the inauguration, noting its success.

The entire line opened on 17 July 1877. Le Journal d’Indre-et-Loire reported no accidents, countering critics’ predictions, and later quoted a passenger: “The tramway is fashionable; a tram ride is a real pleasure, like buying a mug of beer. For example, at the Grandmont barrier on Sunday evening, no one got off at the signal. Everyone stayed on, leaving 50 people waiting.”

The closed, two-axle tramcars, designed for 30 passengers, were typically pulled by a single horse. In high demand, two-car trains were occasionally formed. Unlike other networks, there was only one passenger class.

=== Compagnie des tramways de Tours ===
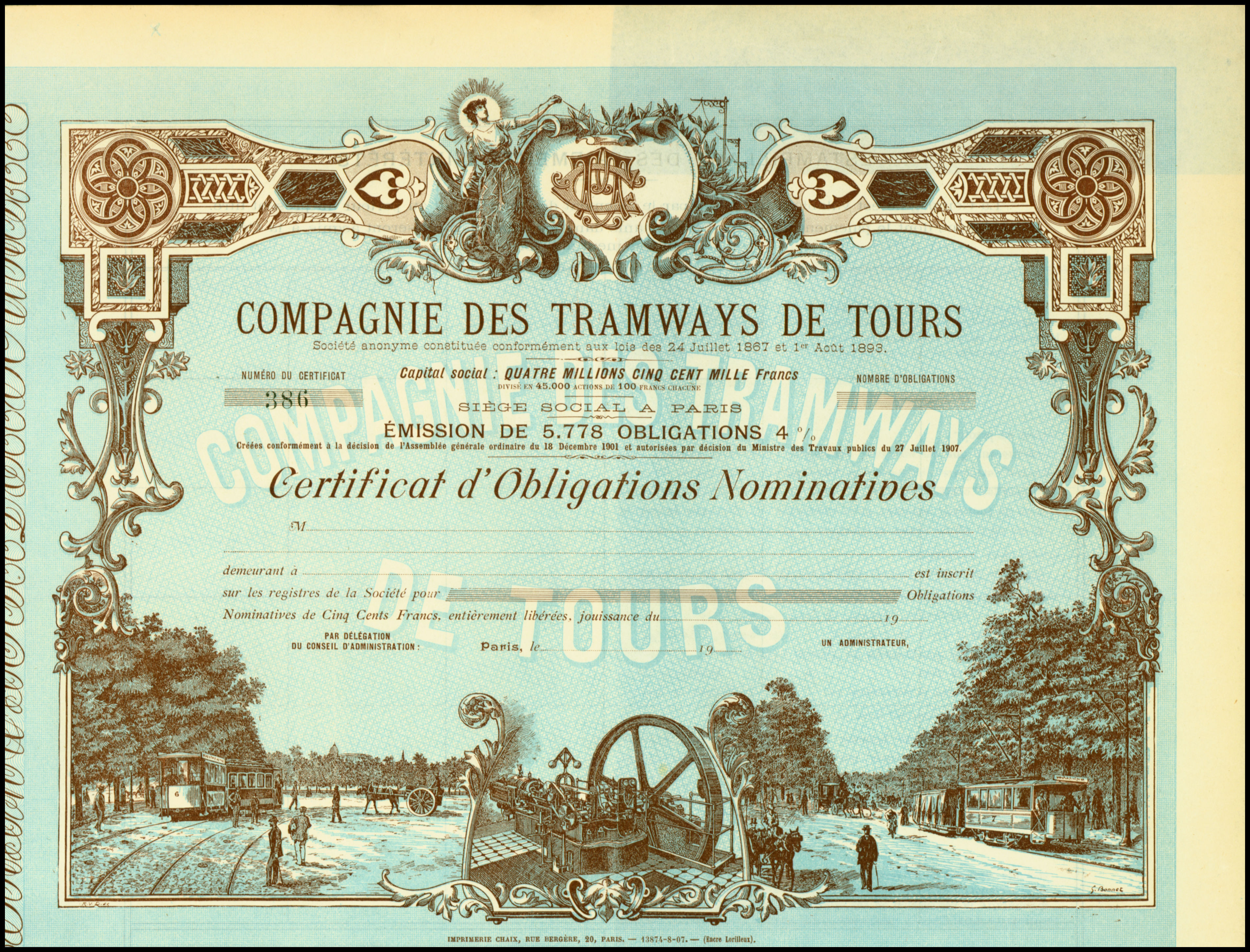
Bond of the Compagnie des tramways de Tours.

In 1898, the newly formed Compagnie des tramways de Tours (CTT), founded by Louis-Marie Josserand de Raguet de Brancion de Liman, took over operations. By 1900, the network spanned 20 km (12 mi), with both standard and metric gauges and four traction types: horse-drawn, steam, ground-based electric, and overhead electric.

Between 1900 and 1901, the network was converted to metre gauge, replacing the initial 1,435 mm (56.5 in) standard gauge. Electric traction fully replaced horses and steam. The depot, originally north of the Loire, was relocated around 1900 to the southern end of Avenue de Grammont in a former gasworks. Initially equipped with a thermal power plant, it was upgraded in 1932 with a substation connected to the general grid.

The network expanded rapidly, reaching its maximum length in 1911. Steam traction ended in 1912, and Diatto ground-contact systems were phased out by 1914. During World War I, some sections were abandoned in 1916, and suburban lines closed in 1932 due to competition from private buses.

=== End of the first tramway network ===
The ageing tramway was nearly destroyed during World War II. Fires ravaged Loire-side districts, Pont Wilson was partially demolished by French forces in 1940 and by German forces in 1944, and the depot was devastated by a 1944 bombing.

After Tours’ liberation in September 1944, the company quickly restored damaged infrastructure. On 26 October 1944, trams resumed on Line A, followed by buses the next day. With Pont Wilson destroyed, the network was split, and a bus shuttled passengers across a temporary footbridge until 10 September 1947. However, the tramway equipment was severely deteriorated. Post-war, trams were seen as outdated, linked to wartime hardship, and hazardous to growing car and bicycle traffic. Their removal was widely supported, and the tramway ceased operations on 14 September 1949, replaced by buses and trolleybuses.

== Network ==
=== Urban lines ===
==== Line A ====
The first line, 3.9 km (2.4 mi) long, ran from the Vouvray barrier (now Île-Aucard stop, near the northern end of Pont de Fil) to the Grandmont barrier (later spelled Grammont, at Carrefour de Verdun, by the Cher bridge). Short extensions were soon added to the current Pont Napoléon and the railway station.

Operated by the Compagnie générale française des tramways, a partnership between the Banque française et italienne and Belgian entrepreneur Frédéric de la Hault, it was an ancestor of Veolia Transport. In 1892, an extension to Champ de Mars, on the Loire’s east side, was built to serve a national exhibition held there.

==== Line B ====
This 4.9 km (3.0 mi) line connected Place Velpeau to the Botanical Garden. Opened on 29 August 1903, it was electric, powered by Diatto ground-contact plots, and served the railway station and Halles.

==== Line C ====
Opened on 6 October 1903, it initially ran from Place Rabelais to Saint-Pierre-des-Corps, ending at the Saint-Pierre-des-Corps barrier on the Loire quays. In 1909, it was extended to Saint-Pierre’s town hall, and in 1910 and 1914, to Joué-lès-Tours. Powered by plots from Place Rabelais to the Loire, it was classified as urban because it initially stayed within Tours’ boundaries.

==== Line C' ====
A branch of Line C. It connected Place Rabelais to Place Thiers, where it interchanged with Line A.

==== Line D ====
This short 970 m (3,180 ft) metric-gauge line linked Place Anatole-France to Place de la Victoire. Opened on 31 August 1906, its trams were electrically powered by plots, except on the quays.

=== Suburban lines ===
==== Tours Town Hall to Vouvray ====
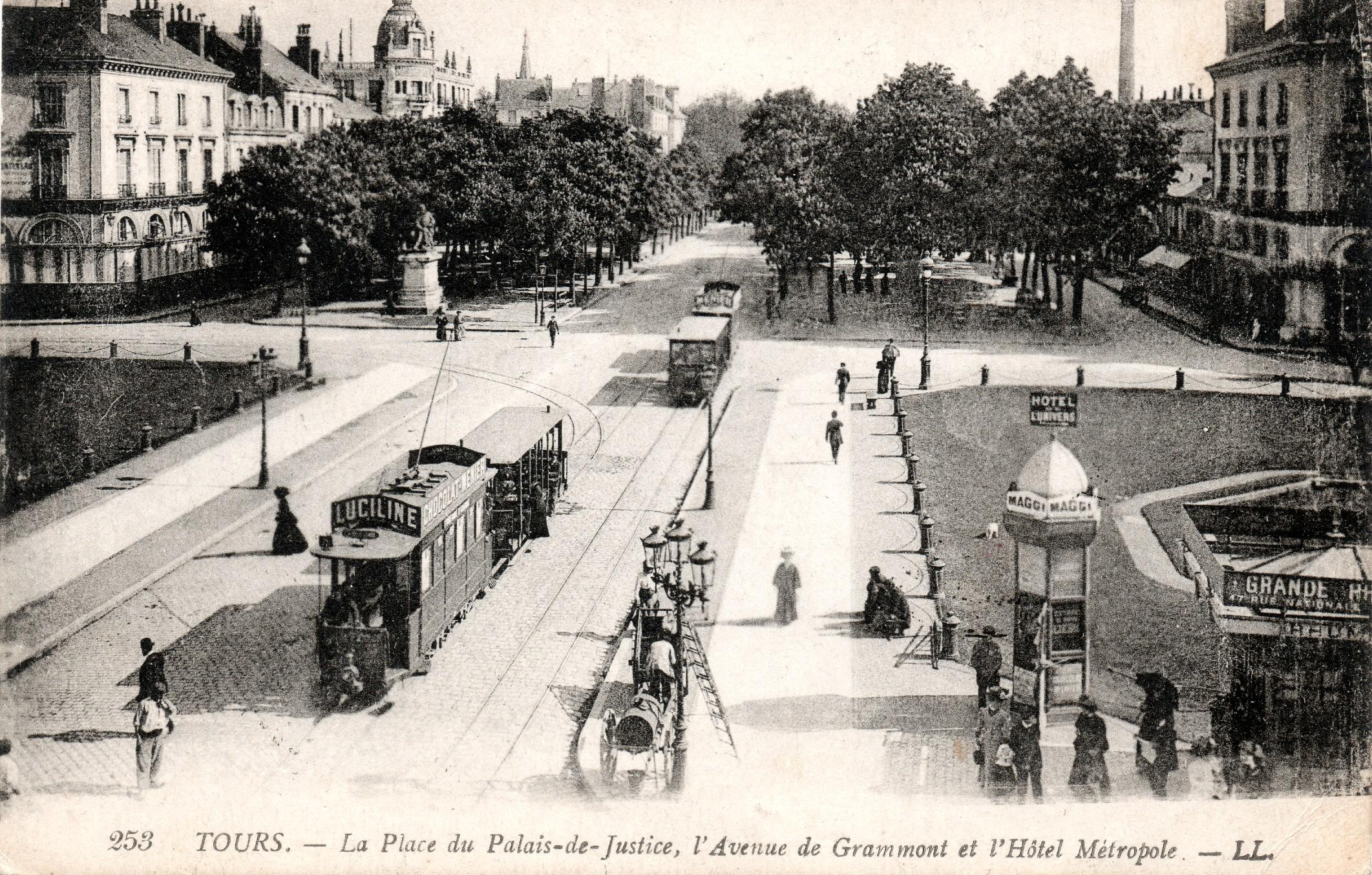
Tramway crossing at Place du Palais de justice, 1910.

In 1881, entrepreneur Monsieur Davenat proposed extending the tramway along the Loire’s right bank to Vouvray, a popular Sunday destination for Tourangeaux by the late 19th century.

Operated by the Société de Tramways à Vapeur de Tours à Vouvray, the line started at the Town Hall (now Place Anatole-France), using existing tracks from the Tours line’s concessionaire. It was extended 7.6 km (4.7 mi) from the Compagnie générale française de tramways’ depot, sharing over 1 km (0.62 mi) with the horse-drawn line. Rolling stock included four non-imperial cars, two with imperials, two freight wagons, and a sweeper, serviced by 15 horses. Steam traction was adopted upon opening in 1889.

Trains, comprising two cars and a van up to 25 m (82 ft) long, ran four daily round trips in winter and six in summer. Fares were 30 centimes to Marmoutier, plus 10 centimes to Rochecorbon, and another 10 centime to Vouvray, totaling 50 centimes for the 9.35 km (5.81 mi) journey, with 5 centimes per bag.

==== La Tranchée Line ====
This 910 m (2,990 ft) line ran along Avenue de la Tranchée from Place Choiseul to Place de la Tranchée. With a gradient under 6‰, fares were double for uphill trips compared to downhill. Initially suburban, it was in Saint-Symphorien, annexed to Tours in 1964.

==== Tours to Luynes ====
Opened on 5 August 1899, this 15 km (9.3 mi) line reached Luynes, with a branch to Fondettes, where it connected with the departmental railway’s northern line from 18 August 1907. It served both passengers and freight. Early 20th-century trams were pulled by steam locomotives built by Société de Saint-Léonard.

==== Tours to Saint-Avertin and Azay-sur-Cher ====
In 1889, the prefect proposed a line to Saint-Cyr-sur-Loire and Fondettes. In May 1890, Saint-Avertin’s mayor secured funding and public subscriptions for a Tours to Saint-Avertin line. A brochure promoted Saint-Avertin, on the Cher, as Tours’ most popular walking destination due to its scenic routes. It estimated 8900 passengers weekly in August and 6400 in December.

Two routes were planned: a 5,700 m (18,700 ft) line via Boulevard Heurteloup, Rue de la Fuie, crossing the Cher canal, and following Rochepinard’s Loire levee, costing 270000 francs; or a 3 km (1.9 mi) route via Avenue de Grammont and the hillside, costing 157000 franc. In 1911, the line extended to Azay-sur-Cher. A petition from Tours’ carriage renters opposed the tramway, favoring departmental railways, but the line opened in 1899.

== Traction methods ==
Initially horse-drawn, with one horse pulling one or two cars, the first line required 50 horses and 30 cars. In 1895, two years after Paris, Tours introduced steam traction using Serpollet steam generators. These underperformed, and due to unavailable spare parts, were discontinued in 1900 for urban lines and in 1912 for suburban lines.

In 1896, following trials in Turin, Tours adopted ground-level electric power via Alfredo Diatto plots, a cutting-edge but challenging system sensitive to track cleanliness and posing electrocution risks. These were replaced by overhead wires, with plots phased out by 1914.

== Gallery ==
The tramways of Tours

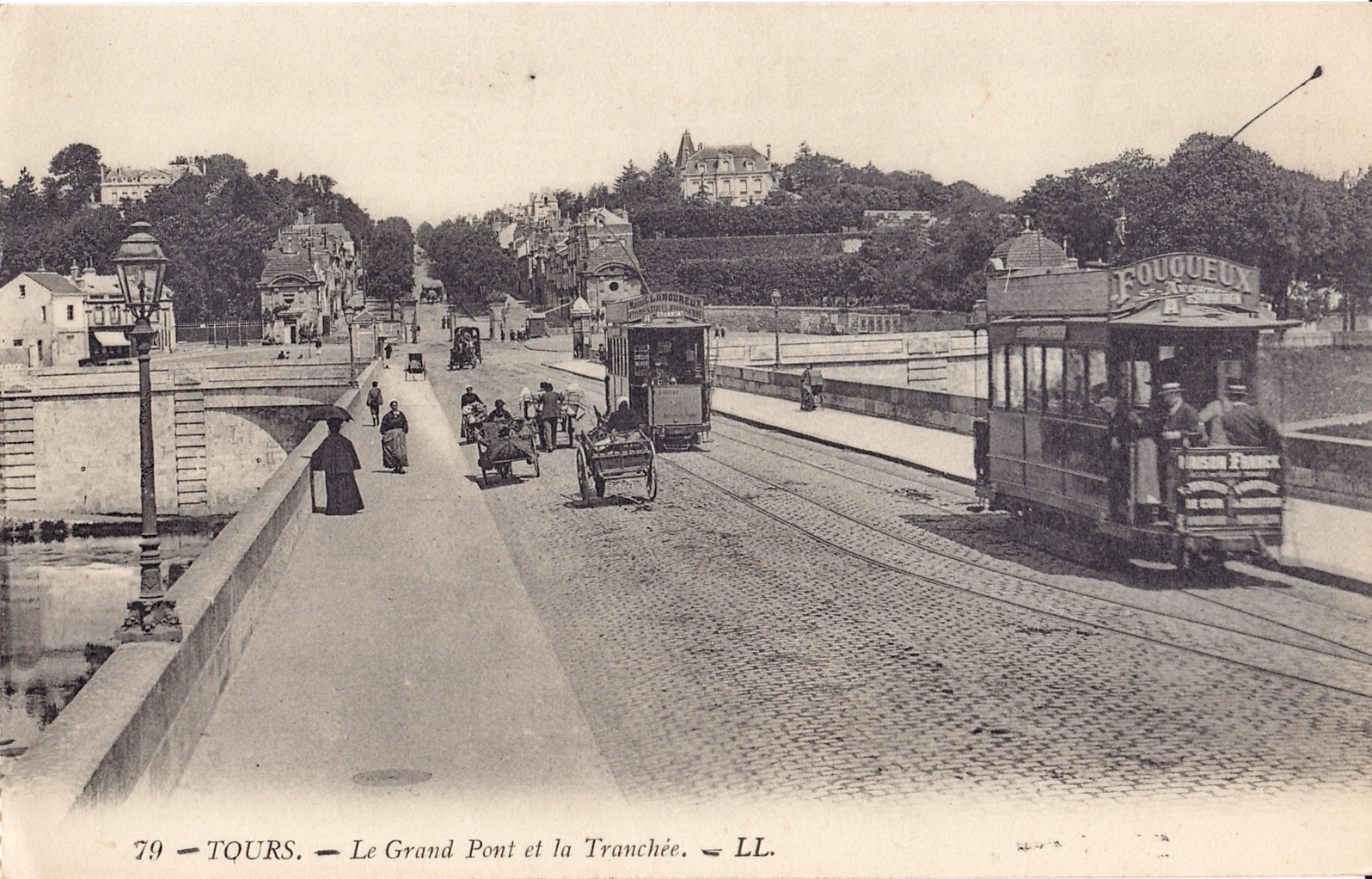
Tramway crossing at the siding of Pont Wilson’s entrance.

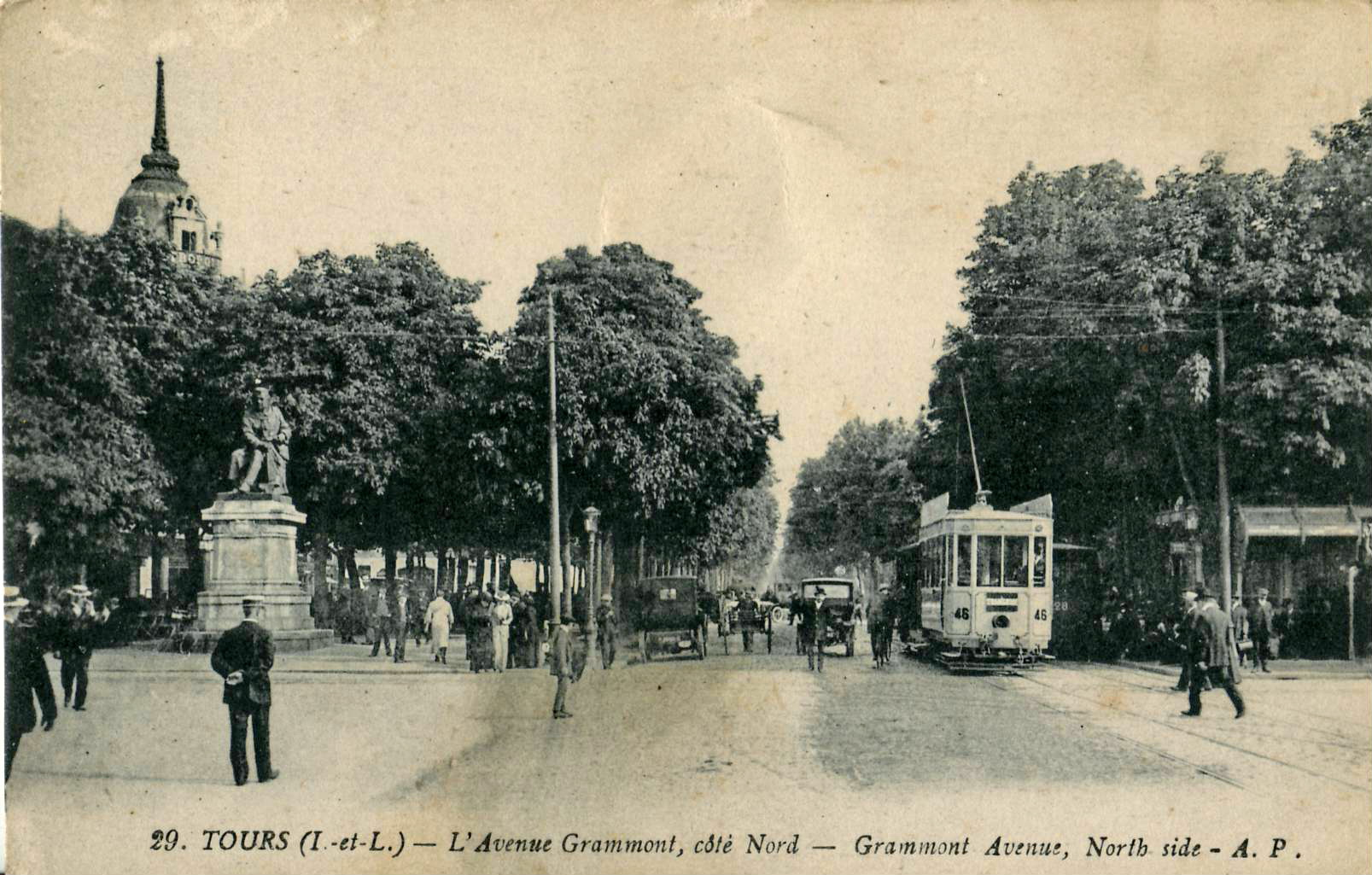
Two trams crossing on Avenue de Grammont.

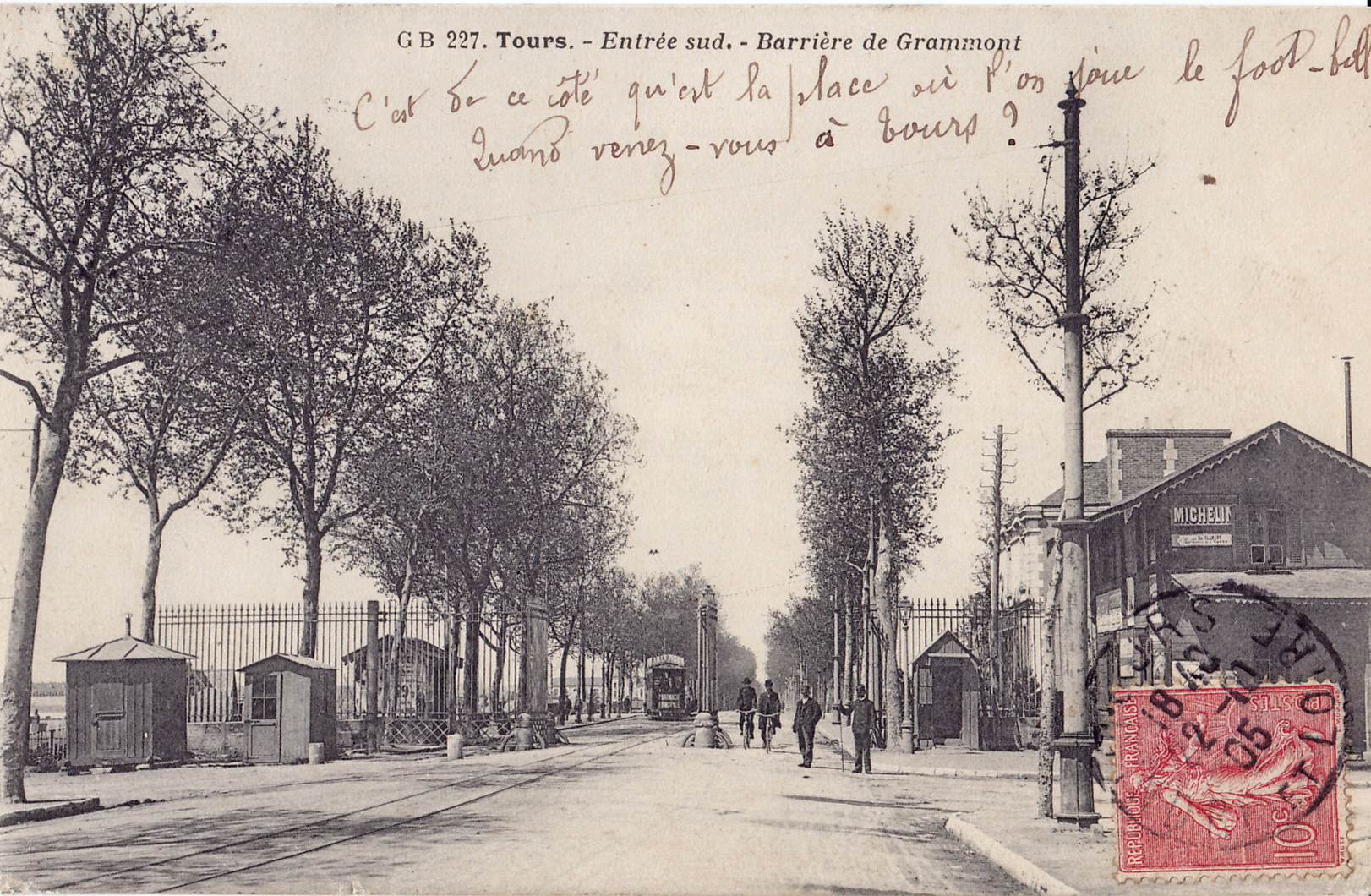
Tollgate at the Grammont barrier.

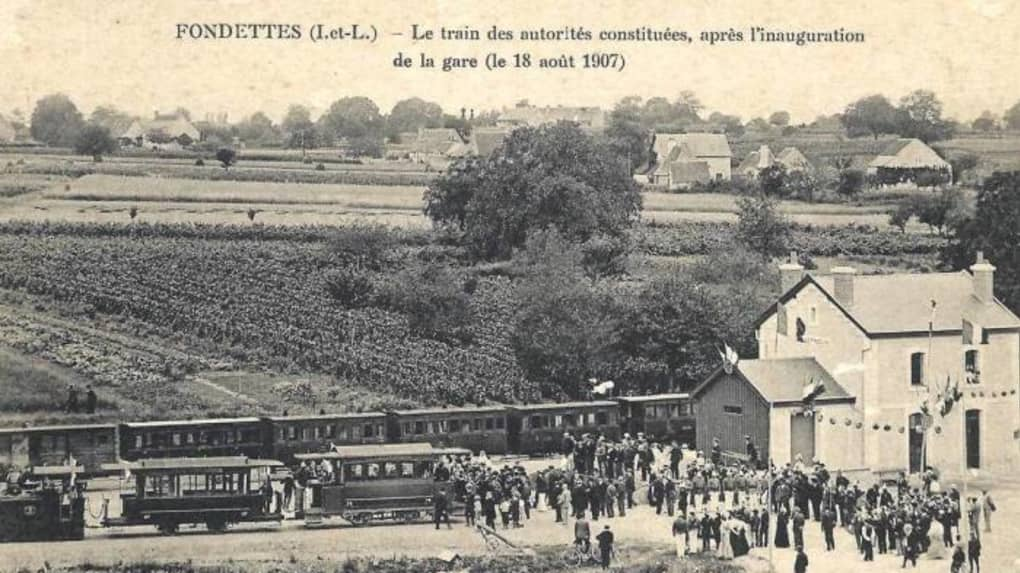
Tramway (foreground) and train (background) at Fondettes station, 18 August 1907.

== See also ==
- Tramway de Tours
- Trolleybus de Tours

== Bibliography ==
- Metz, J. (1970). "Les chemins de fer secondaires d'Indre & Loire: IV – Les Tramways de Tours" [Secondary railways of Indre-et-Loire: IV – The Tramways of Tours]. Chemins de fer régionaux et urbains (in French). 1970-II (98): 3–66.
- Porhel, Jean-Luc (2013). Tours, Mémoire du tramway [Tours: Memory of the tramway] (in French). Tours: Archives municipales de Tours. p. 68. ISBN 978-2-9079-3518-0.
