= Beaujardin =

French district in the city of Tours

Beaujardin-Raspail
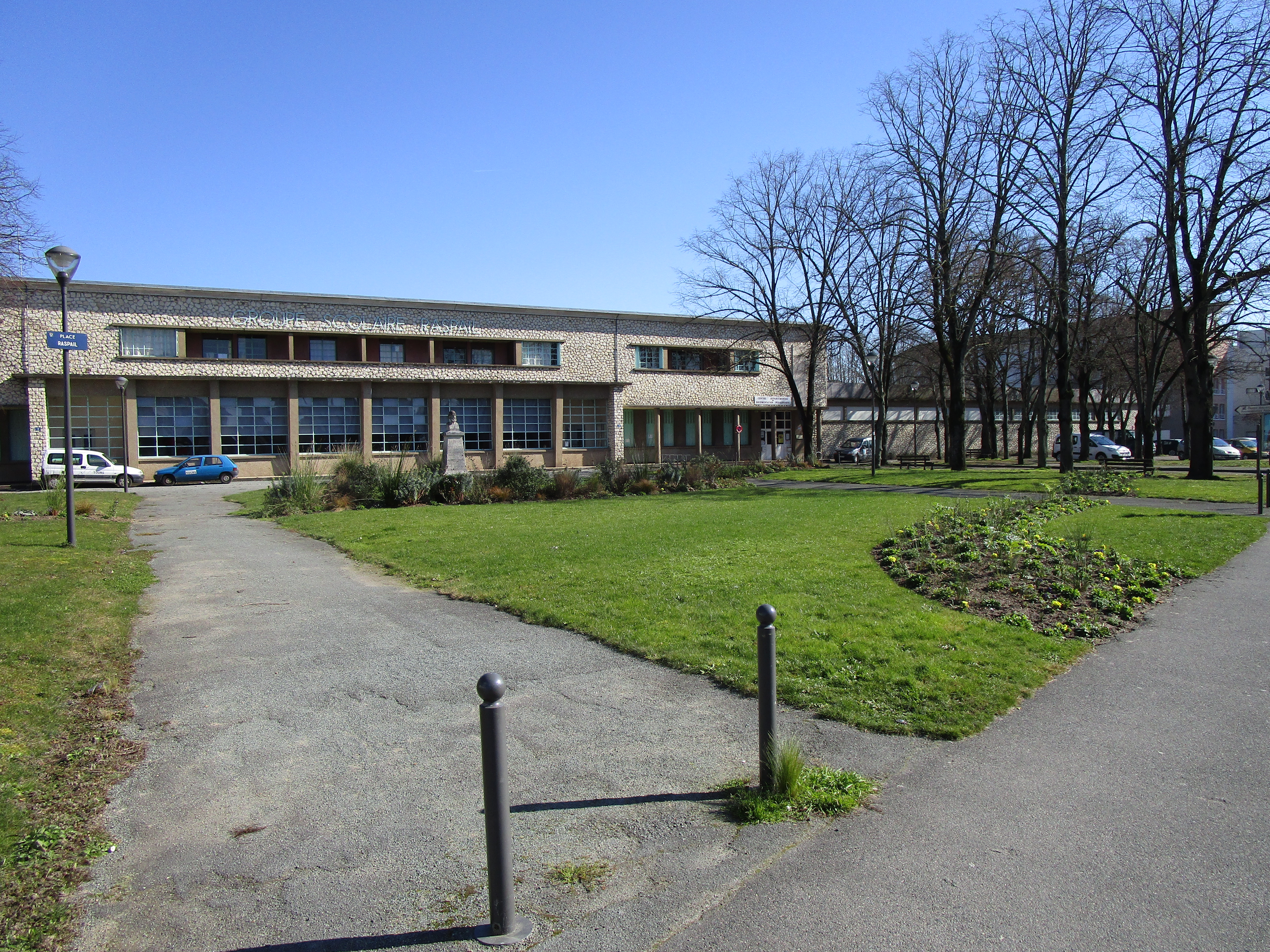
- The Raspail square.
- Interactive map of Beaujardin-Raspail
- Coordinates: 47°22′37″N 0°42′28″E
- Country: France
- Region: Centre-Val de Loire
- Department: Indre-et-Loire
- City: Tours

Population
  - Total: 3,955

Beaujardin or Beaujardin-Raspail is a district of the French city of Tours. Insee defined it in its division of the Tours commune into 22 IRIS. It is located in the southeast of the commune. It borders the Sanitas district to the north, Rochepinard and the banks of the Cher to the south, and the commune of Saint-Pierre-des-Corps to the east.

Although the district traces its origins back to the 19th-century château de Beaujardin, it developed mainly between the wars, notably with the establishment of a workers' garden city, and completed the bulk of its urbanization during the Trente Glorieuses period. With a population of some 4,000 in 2012, Beaujardin is a mixed-use neighborhood composed largely of small owner-occupied homes, but also contains numerous social housing units, including two workers' housing estates.

== Delimitation ==
The Beaujardin-Raspail district is defined by Insee in its division of the Tours commune into 22 “îlots regroupés pour l'information statistique” (IRIS). It is bounded by the railroad lines following the Didier Daurat street to the north, the A10 freeway to the east, boulevard Richard Wagner to the south, and Avenue de Grammont to the west. Neighboring districts are Le Sanitas and La Fuye-Velpeau to the north, Rochepinard and the banks of the Cher to the south and west, and the commune of Saint-Pierre-des-Corps to the east. The “Beaujardin” sector is centered around the garden and housing estate of the same name, while the much narrower Raspail sector lies to the east of the Édouard Vaillant street.

== History ==
=== Origins ===
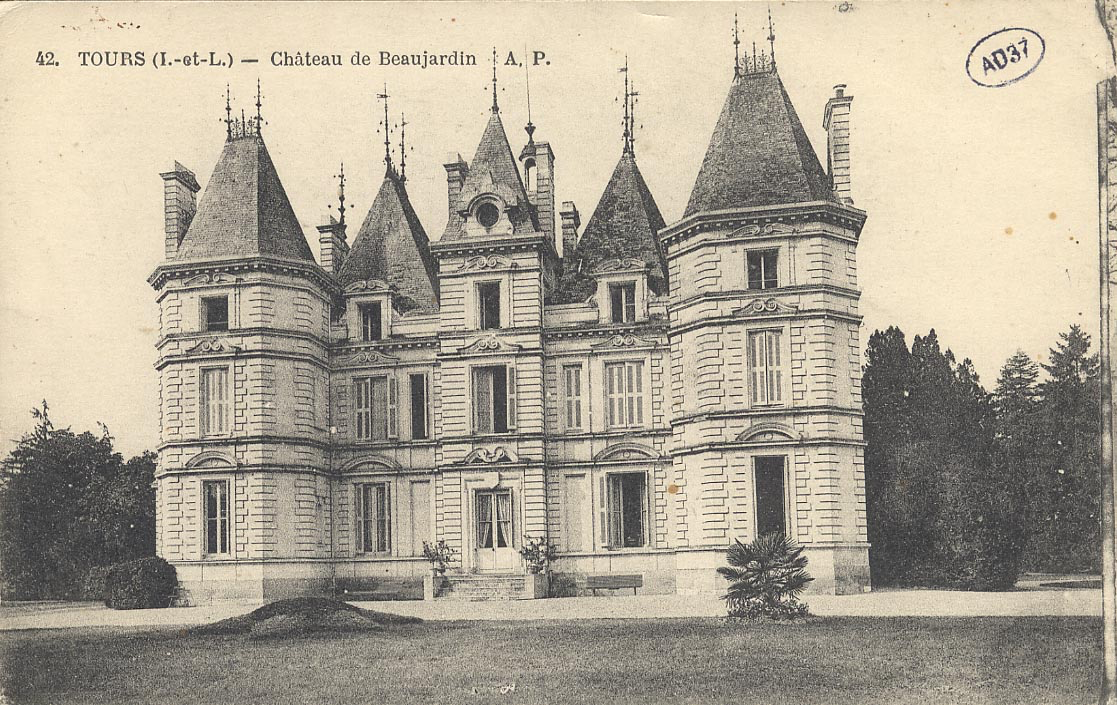
The Château de Beaujardin.

One of the neighborhood's most important early developments was the Château de Beaujardin, built in the mid-19th century for General Viala Charon. Between 1868 and 1887, its vast 12-hectare park was home to a zoo. The animals, including kangaroos, llamas, Patagonian hares, and above all exotic birds, were brought together by the wealthy Dutch Viscount Joseph Cornély. Acquired by the city of Tours in 1925, the château was destroyed in 1944 during the bombing raids of World War II. All that remains today is a small portion of its garden, which has become the central square of the Beaujardin district.

The neighborhood then developed along the same lines as La Fuye-Velpeau to the north, with numerous small one and two-story houses, often with individual gardens. Urbanization is organized in a checkerboard pattern, notably around Place Beaujardin.

=== Beaujardin housing estate ===
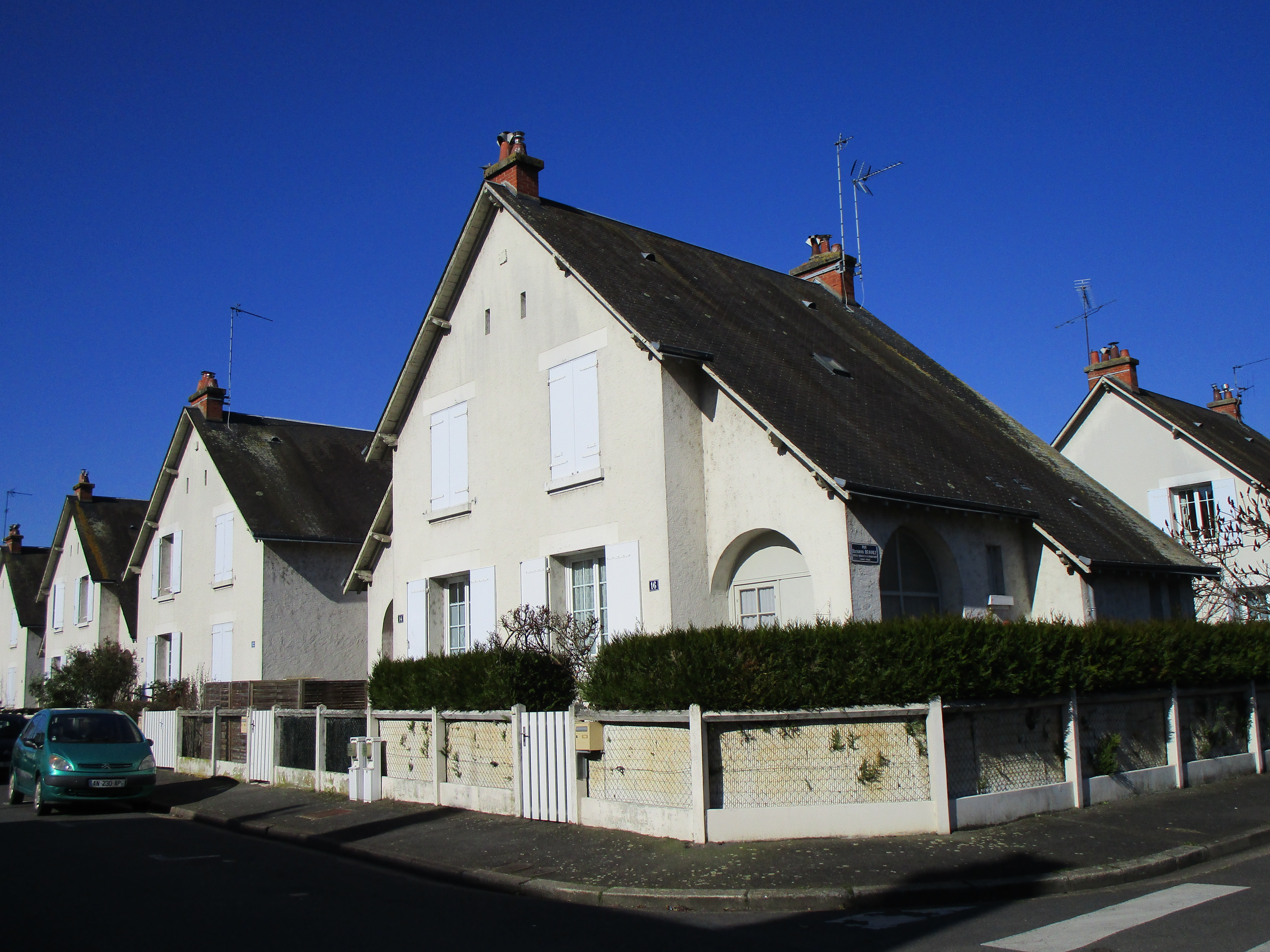
The Beaujardin estate.

With the acquisition of Château Beaujardin and, above all, its vast right-of-way, the city of Tours was able to build a workers' housing estate there in 1932, designed by Touraine architect Maurice Boille. This suburban housing estate is located in the southern part of the district, in the immediate vicinity of the railroad lines. It is built on the same model as the Jolivet city in La Fuye-Velpeau, with houses mostly divided into two dwellings. They feature high, pointed slate roofs and individual gardens. Designed for families, there are a total of 51 units, 37 of which have three bedrooms and the remainder have two bedrooms. Unlike the Jolivet city, which is organized around a central square, only streets crisscross the city, except for the modest place Clément Ader.

Comfort was innovative for the time, with connection to sewage, electricity, and town gas. Each house has a laundry room, a cellar, and an attic, while ventilation systems are designed to avoid insalubrity. However, the aging of the housing stock led to problems of dampness, and it had to adapt to the more demanding comforts of the post-war era. Tenants often converted their laundry room into a bathroom, and the social landlord modernized the insulation. Today, these single-family homes are still compatible with modern comforts, and the majority are occupied by retirees. The houses are also very much in demand with the social landlord, with a waiting time of up to ten years.

=== Post-war ===
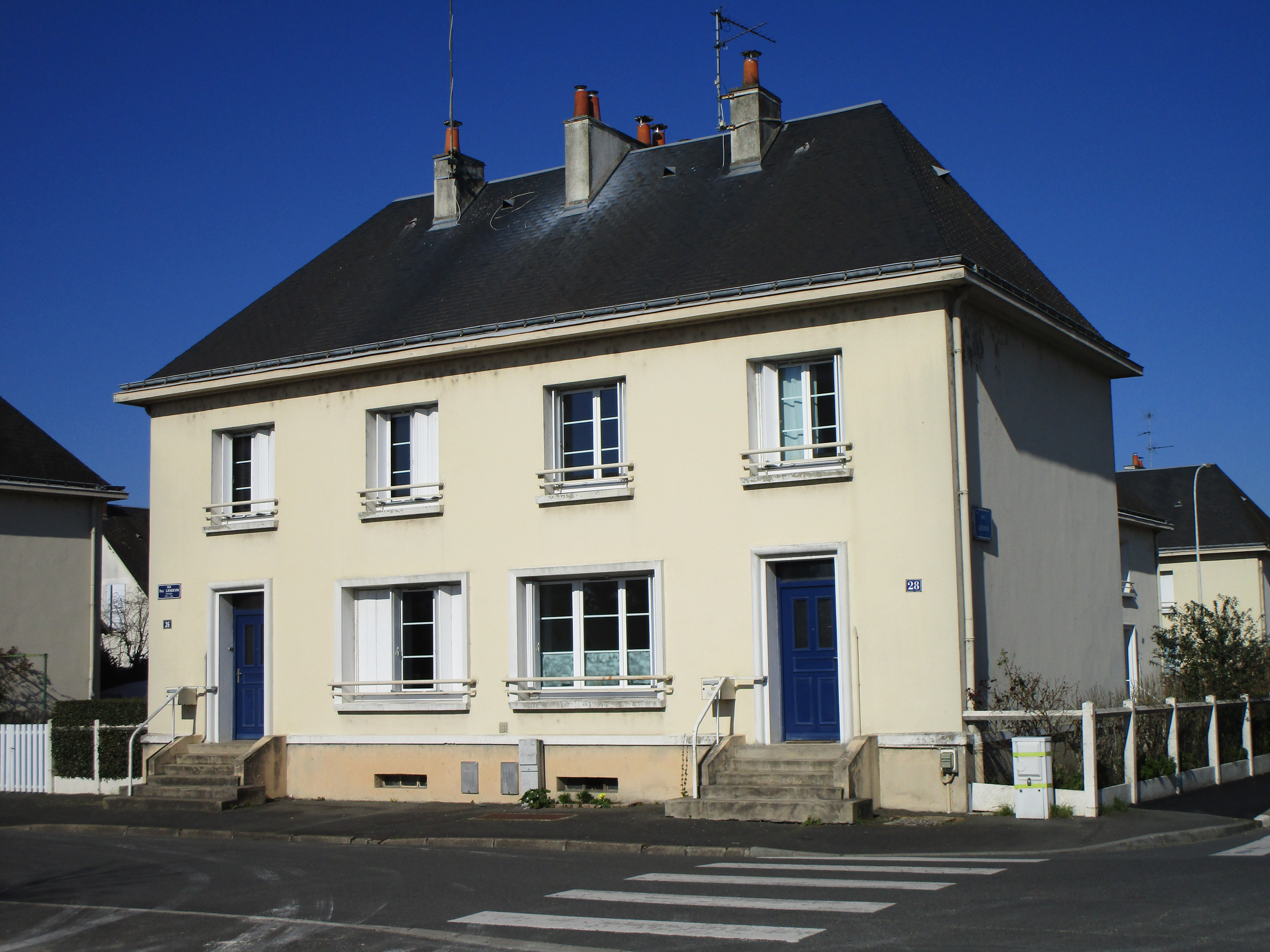
Bords de Cher housing estate.

Several other social housing estates were built in the neighborhood in the years that followed. The first is the “bord de Cher” estate, built shortly after World War II, immediately to the east of the Beaujardin estate. It consists of more massive, rectangular houses with gutter walls, each containing between two and four dwellings. Although its architecture stands out from its surroundings, the roads and gardens are aligned to mark continuity with the neighboring housing estate.

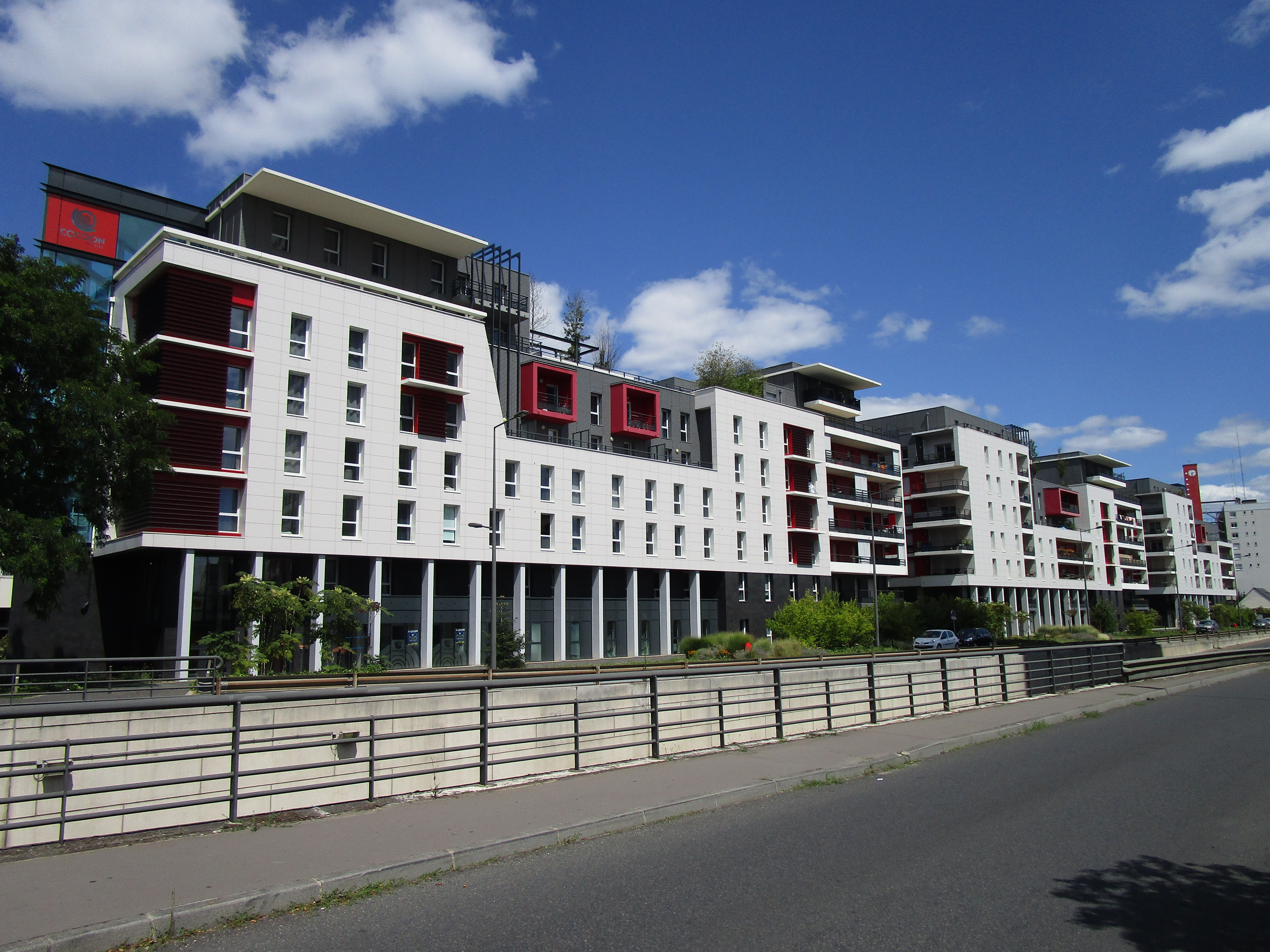
New residences on boulevard Richard Wagner.

At the end of the 1950s, the city of Tours was faced with a huge demand for housing due to the baby boom of the “Trente glorieuses”. Beaujardin was faced with a problem of overcrowding, with an average of 1.2 inhabitants per room and more than a quarter of the residents being children under the age of fourteen. Other housing projects, this time multi-family housing, were built in the neighborhood under the initiative of OPAC Tours Habitat. These included cités Musset to the west, Severine in the center, and Agnès Sorel and Raspail to the east. The 2000s saw a sharp rise in the price of the district's old center, much sought after by buyers.

In 2014, three buildings containing five new residences were inaugurated at the western end of the district, north of Boulevard Richard Wagner and close to Place de Verdun. Built to the same design, the buildings feature a total of almost 360 homes, including 116 studio hotel apartments in the Cocoon residence. There are also 88 social housing units, half of which are reserved for the elderly in the Résidence de l'Olivier, while the other 44 apartments in the Résidence Jean Munier are acquired by the local landlord. These are mainly small and medium-sized apartments.

== Living conditions ==
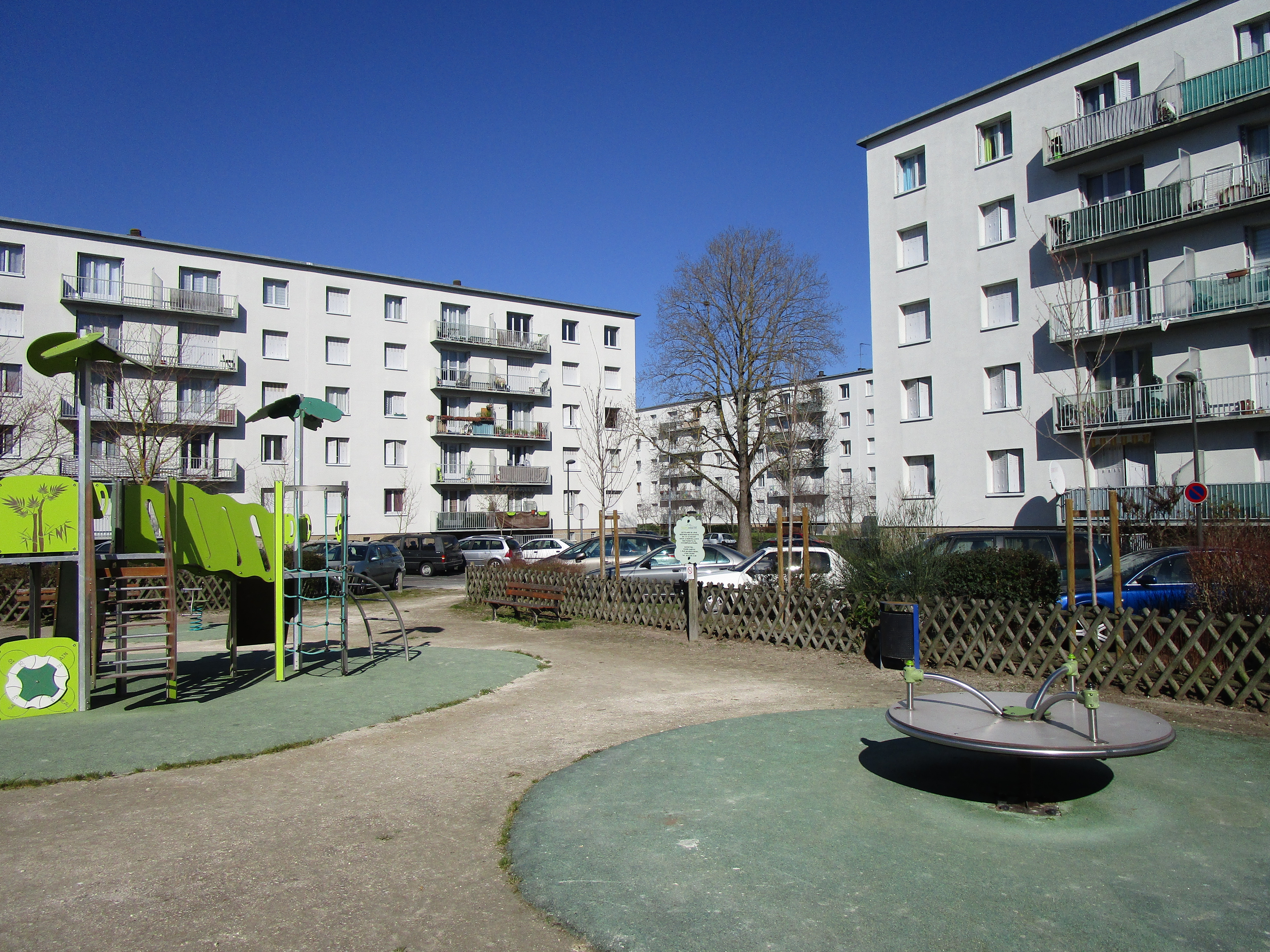
The Musset public housing estate, to the west of the district.

Beaujardin-Raspail is a relatively mixed neighborhood, with a mix of middle-class and working-class residents. Residents' average incomes are intermediate: 22,200 euros per year per household on average, or around 1,850 euros per month per household in 2009. The average household size is 2.0 persons. The unemployment rate is slightly lower than the municipal average, at 13% versus 14% in 2009.

Nearly 64% of employees in the district are white-collar and blue-collar workers, and 26% of residents are retired, two categories that are over-represented in the district compared to the city as a whole. Nearly 47% of residents are homeowners and 31% are social housing tenants, compared with 32% and 27% respectively for the commune as a whole in 2009. The district is therefore well endowed with social housing, which is fairly evenly distributed: to the east, center, and west.

== Utilities ==
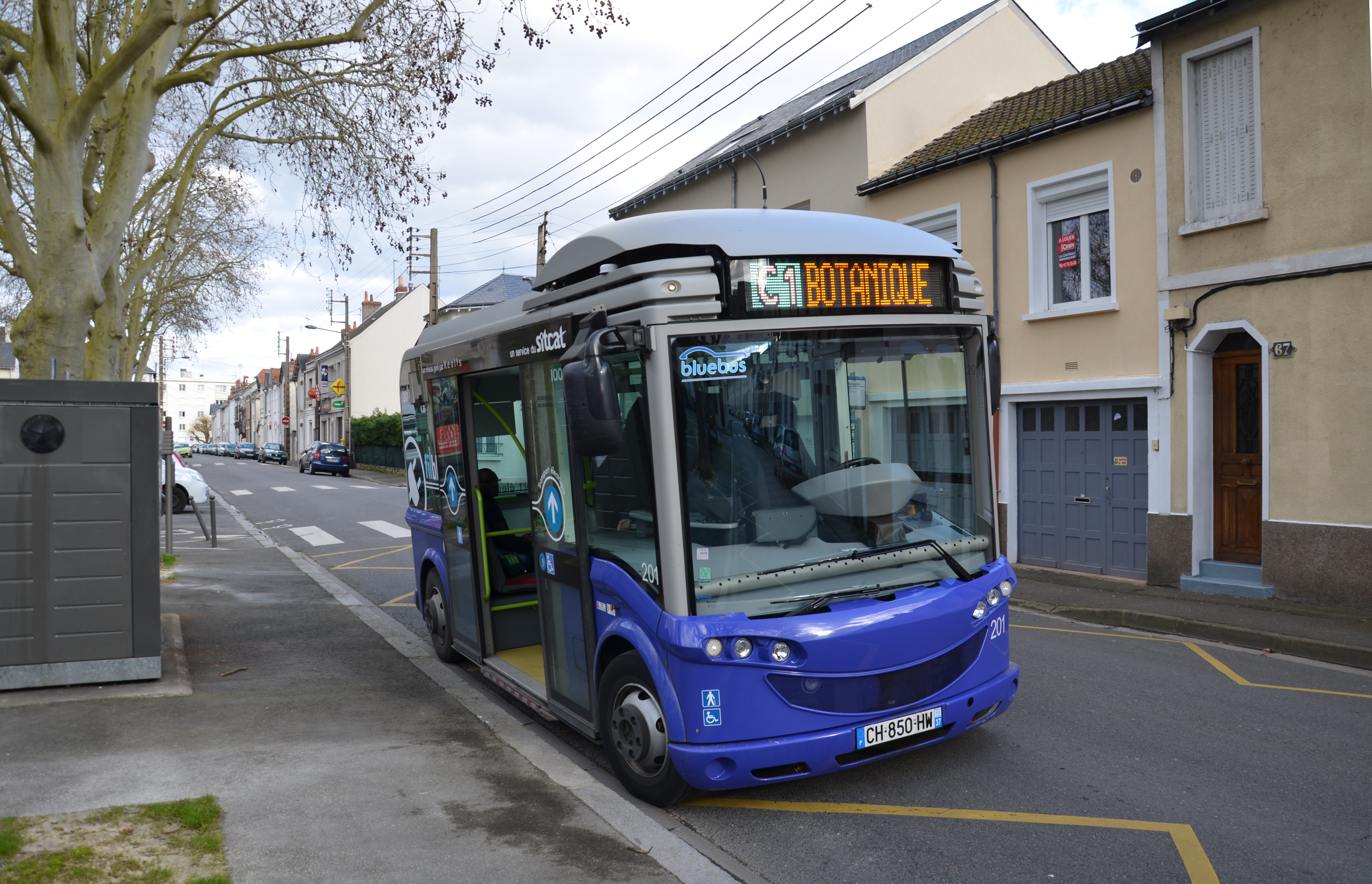
Fil bleu network minibus at the “Beaujardin” stop, Georges Renard street.

In terms of transport, the district is mainly served by the Fil bleu agglomeration network. Bus line no. 14 serves the heart of the district, and four other lines cross the main thoroughfares, boulevard Richard Wagner and rue Édouard Vaillant. Road traffic is facilitated by the proximity of several major arteries, especially the A10 freeway to the east and Boulevard Richard Wagner to the south.

In the south of the district, along boulevard Richard Wagner, you'll find the Chassagne fire station, built in 1966. The imposing building houses around 140 firefighters, including 80 professionals and 60 volunteers, as well as a rescue school. The city of Tours hopes to relocate its 140 municipal police officers there after 2019, by renovating and extending the site. The Sécurité Civile may also follow suit.

In the same complex as the elementary school, Place Raspail houses a regional educational documentation center. The “Beaujardin-Raspail-Rochepinard” neighborhood committee is located on Place Beaujardin and therefore includes the 2,000-strong Rochepinard housing estate to the south of Boulevard Richard Wagner.

== Business and shopping ==
Most of the neighborhood's businesses are located around the central Place de Beaujardin. Today, there are around ten shops in the area, which has suffered a severe decline in recent decades. Between 1984 and 2004, the area lost thirty stores, some of which were converted into housing. At the same time, the Intermarché supermarket moved into the neighborhood on Édouard Vaillant street.

== Education ==
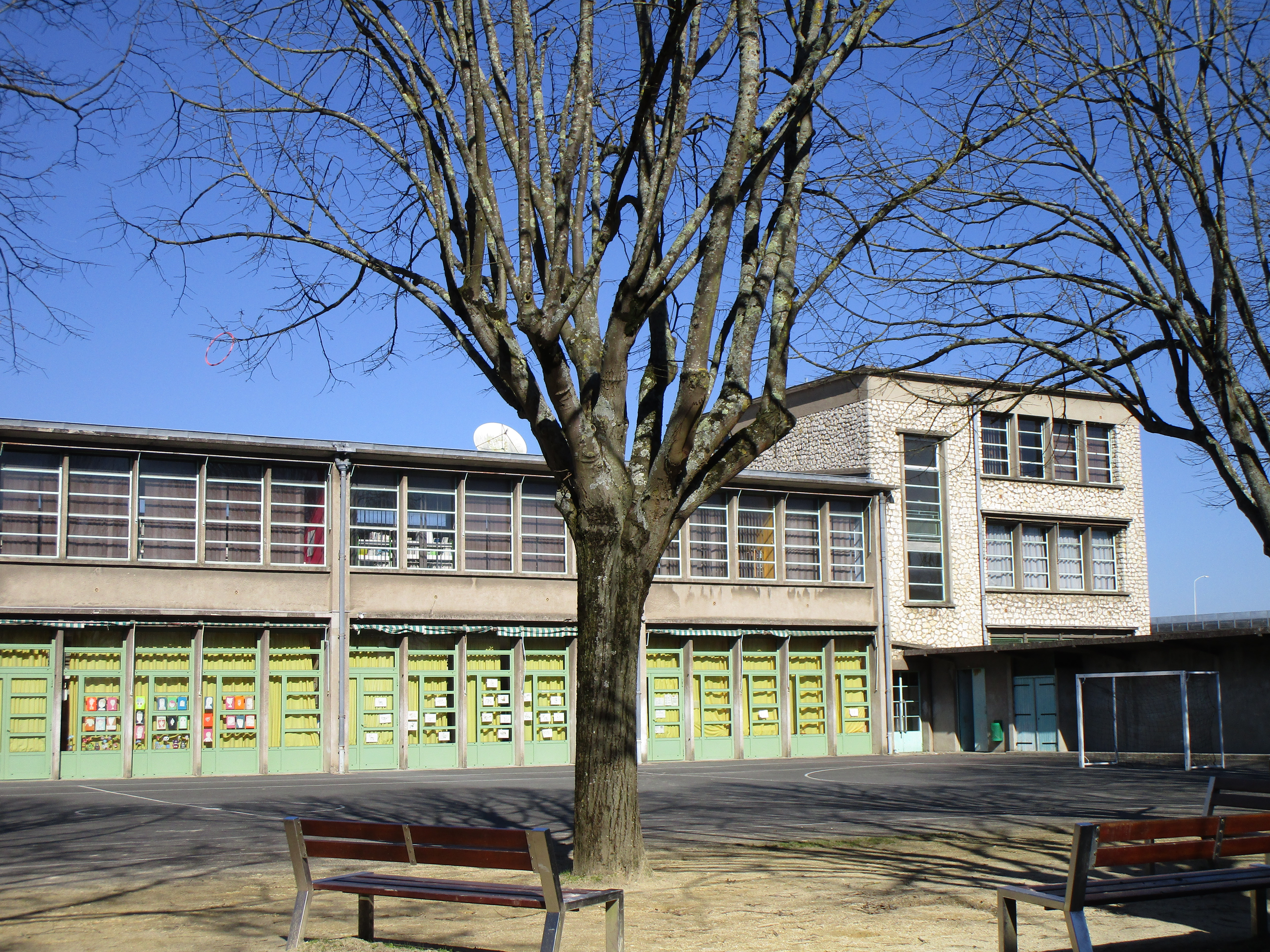
Raspail elementary school.

The Beaujardin-Raspail neighborhood is home to two educational establishments, each containing a nursery school and an elementary school. The largest is the Raspail public school, located to the east of the neighborhood on the square of the same name. In 2017, it had 360 pupils, including French sign language teaching units, while the school welcomes hearing-impaired children integrated into a class for school inclusion (Clis).

Also in the neighborhood, on Beaujardin street near the town square, is the private Catholic school Sainte-Marguerite. It has around a hundred pupils in nursery and primary school and is part of a much larger group spread across the Touraine conurbation, notably in Chambray-lès-Tours.

== Gallery ==
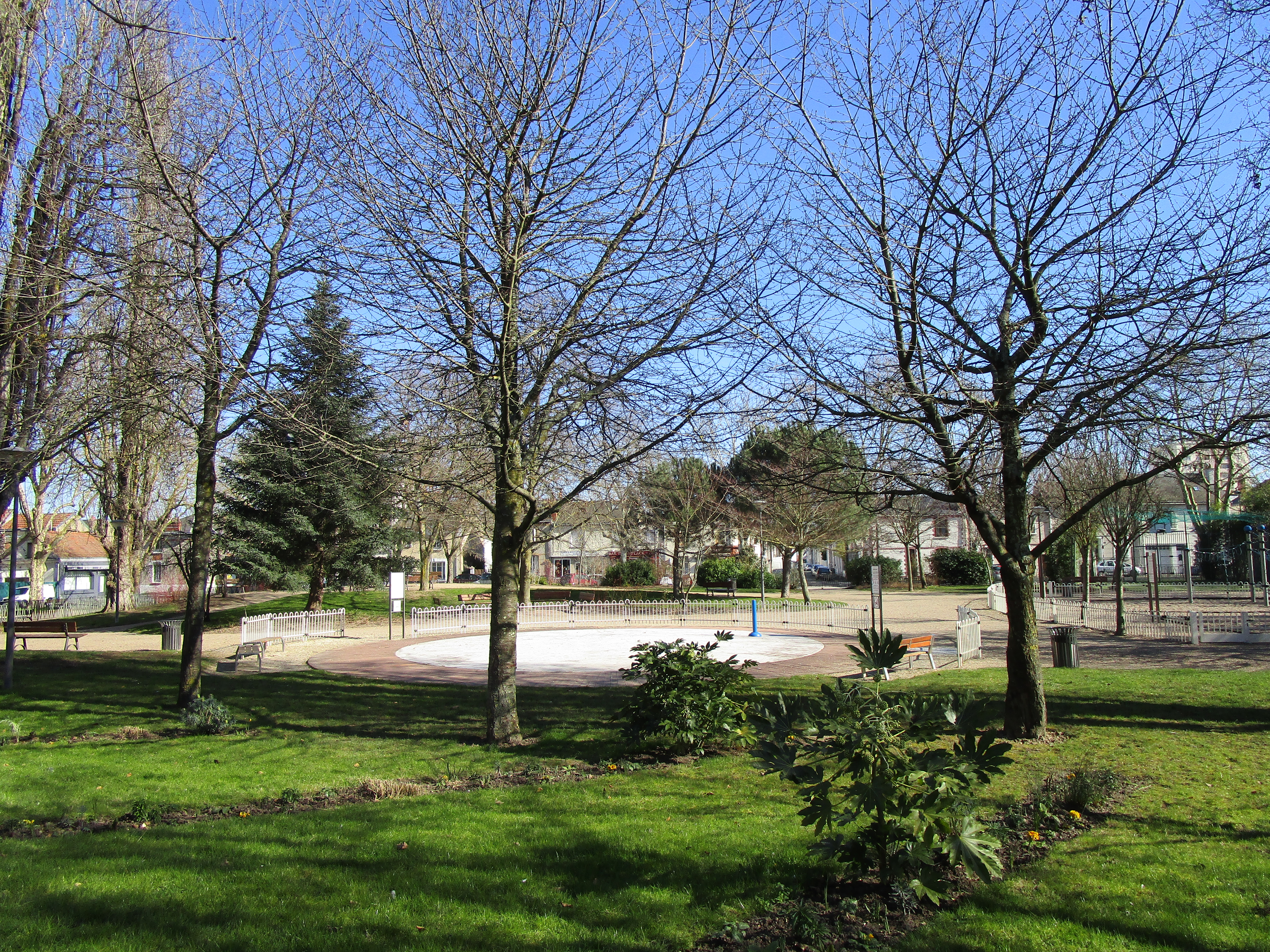
The central Beaujardin square.

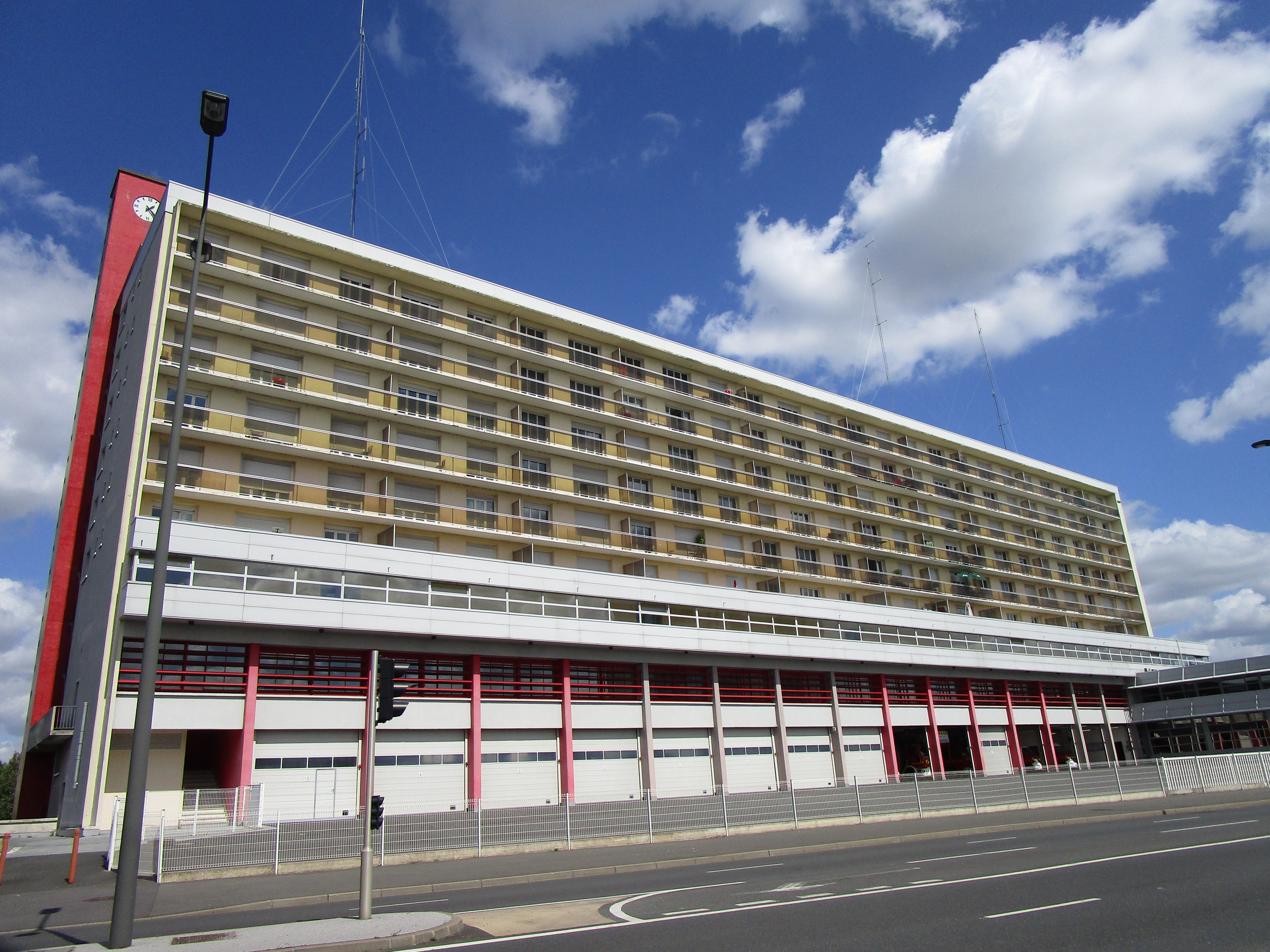
Chassagne barracks.

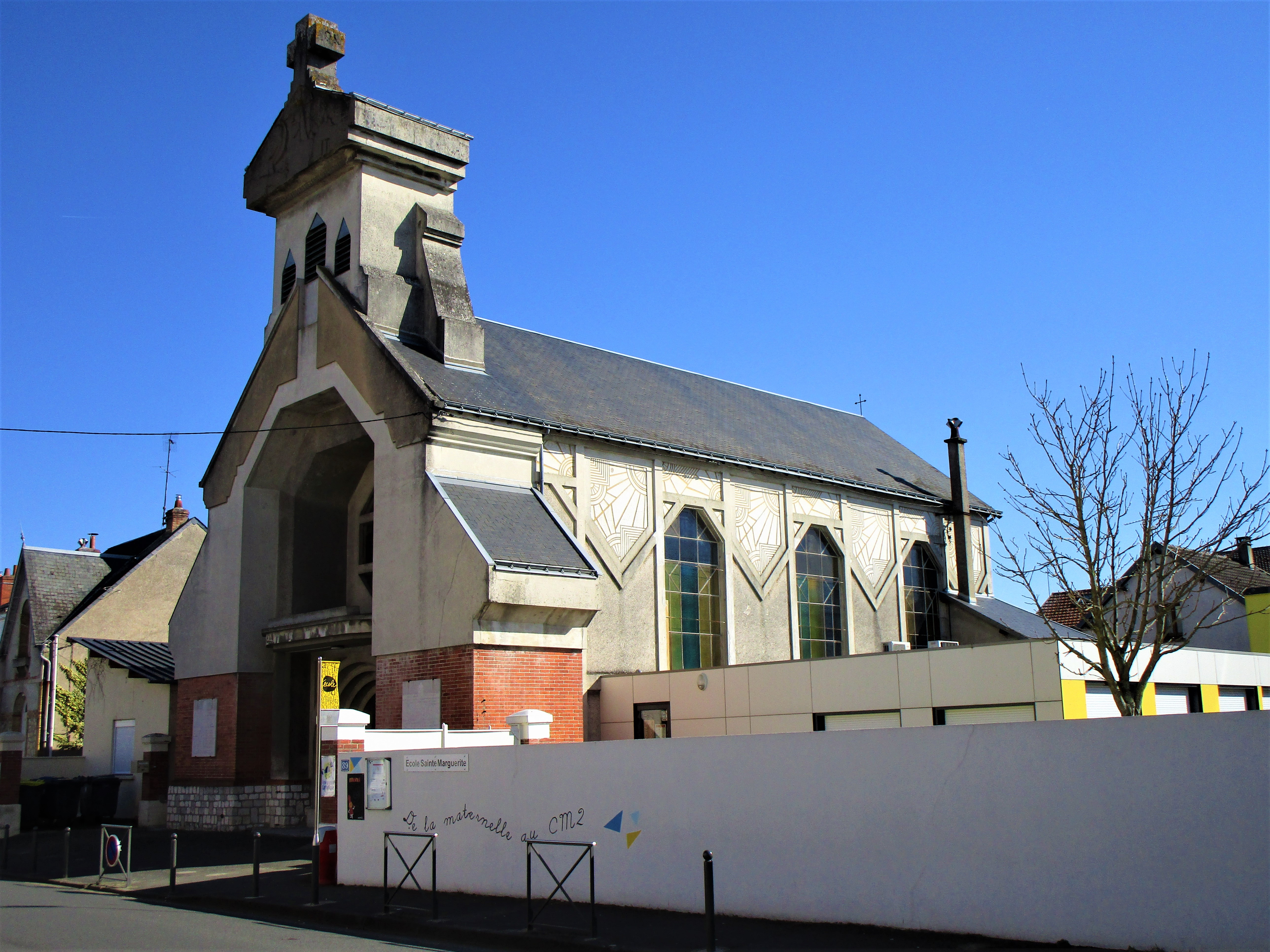
Sainte-Famille church, adjacent to Sainte-Marguerite school.

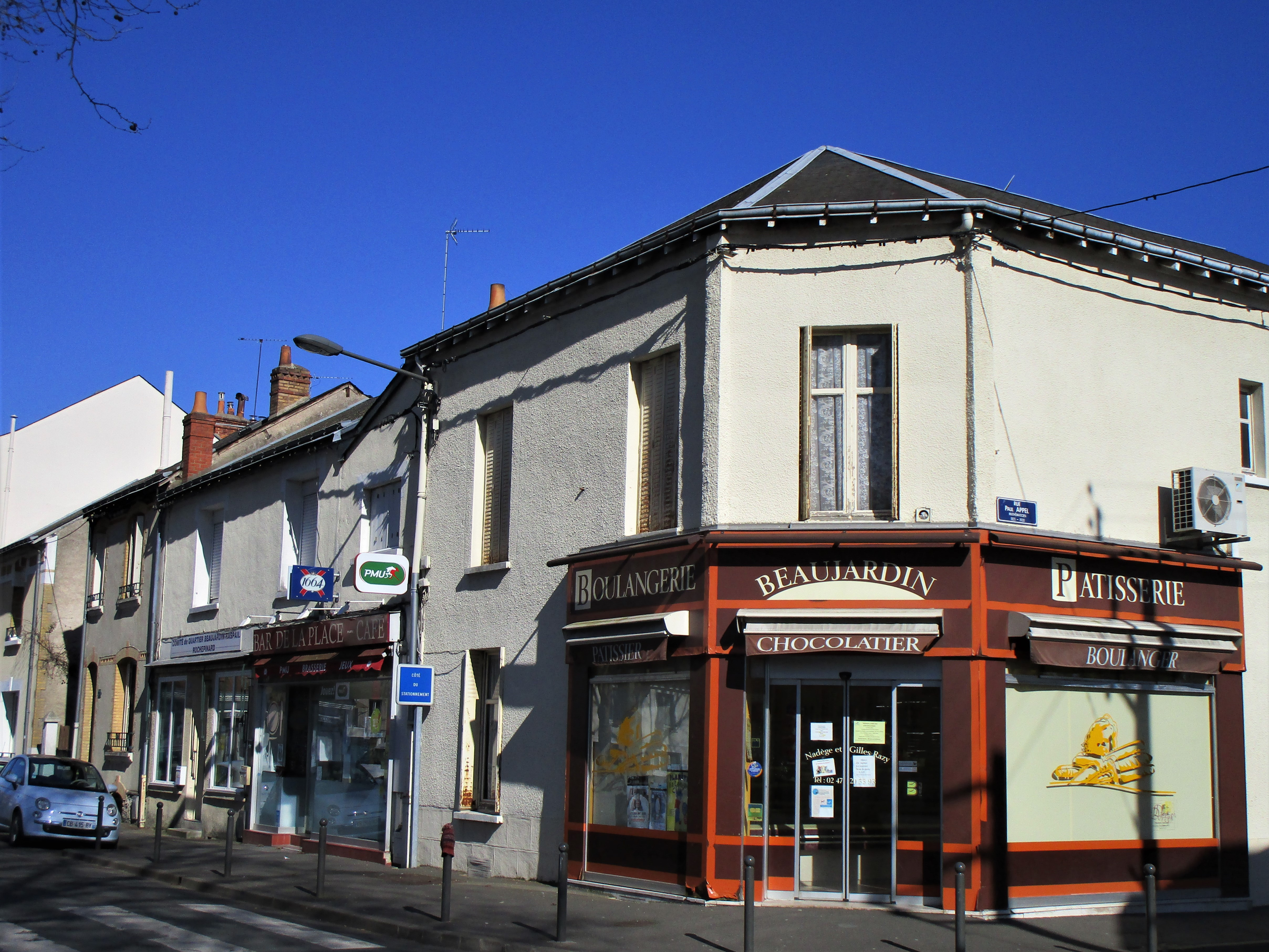
Shops in Beaujardin Square.

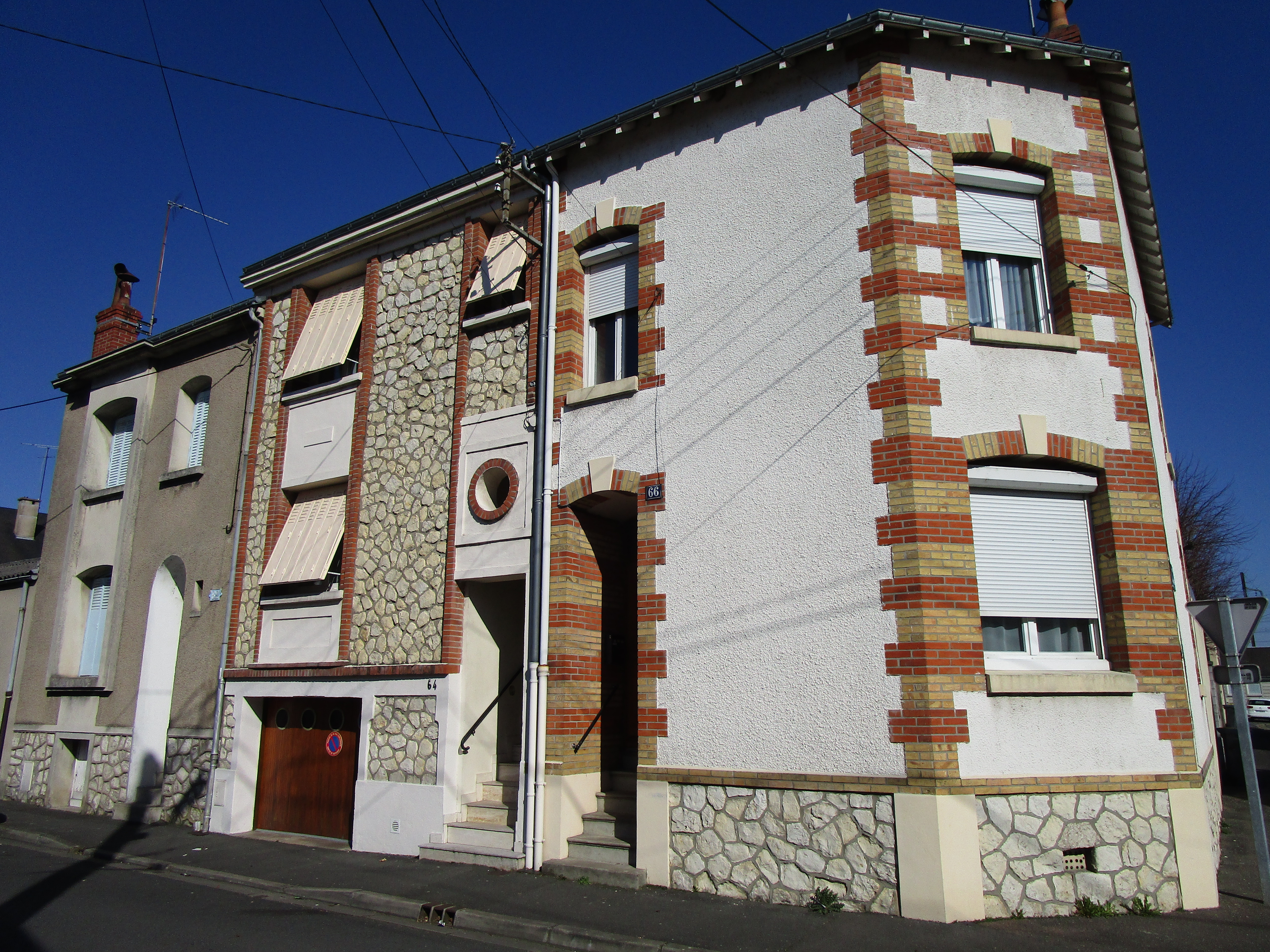
Houses on Christophe Colomb street.

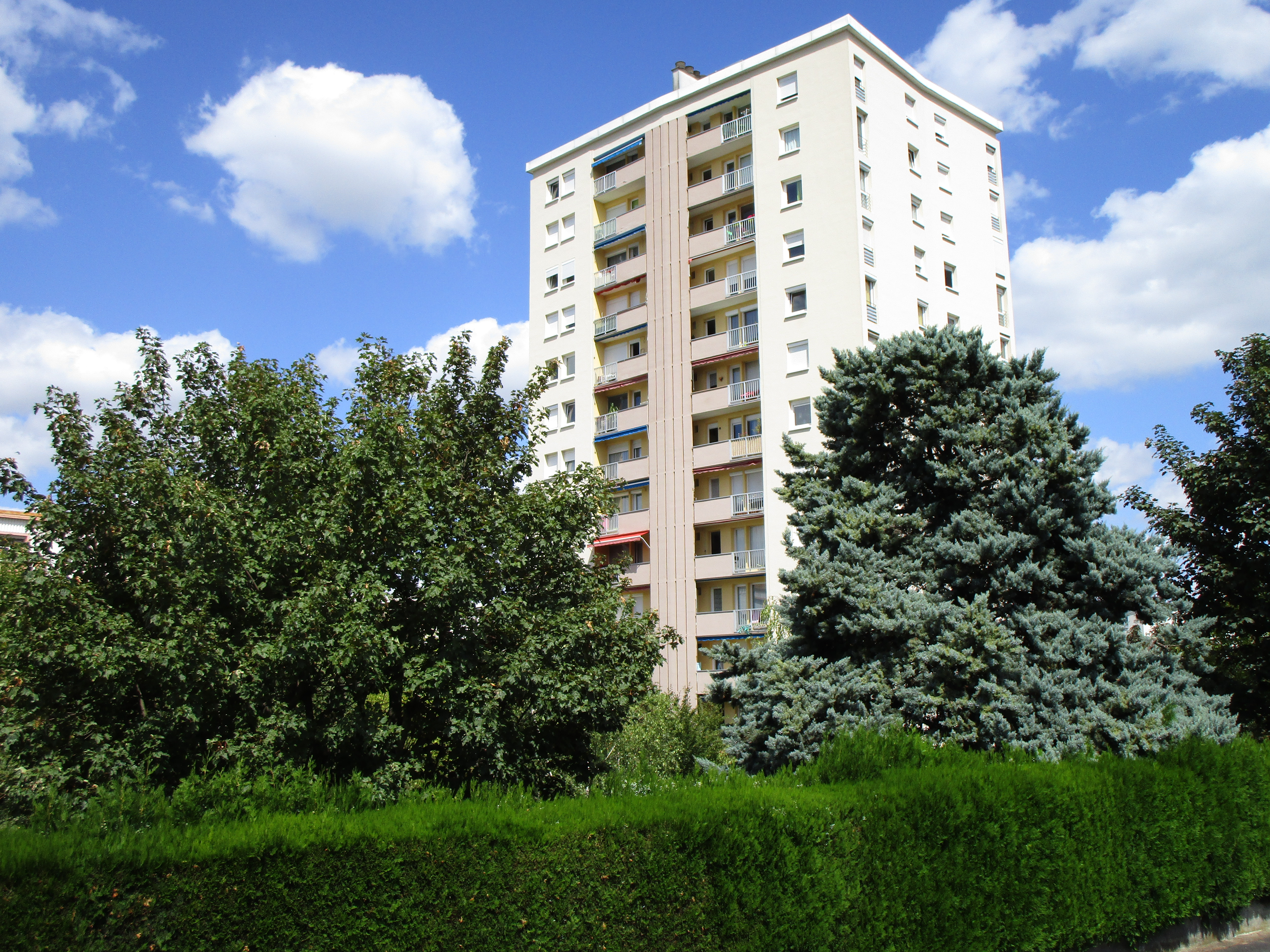
Building on Marcel Sembat street.

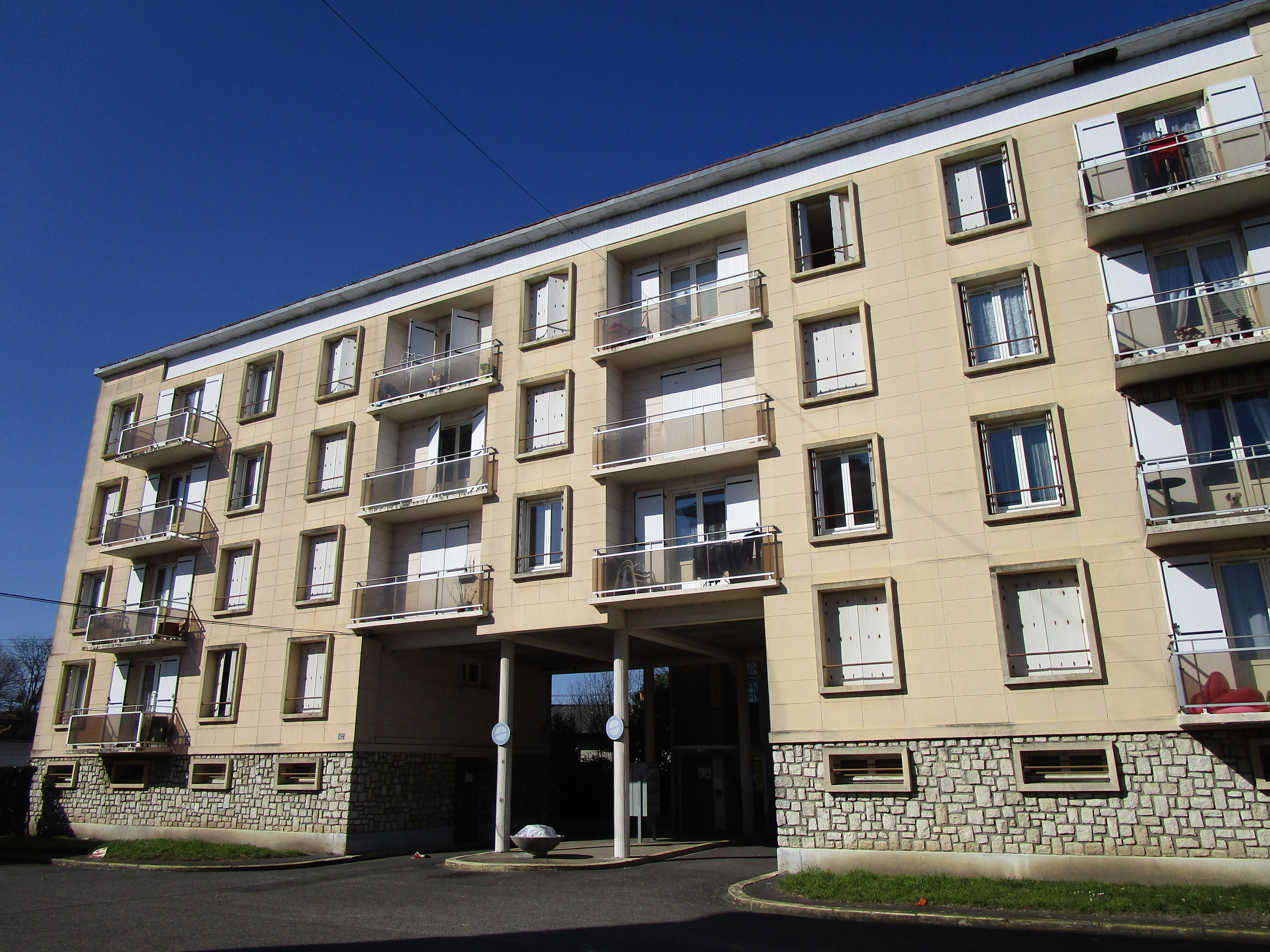
Touraine Logement social residence on Beaujardin street.

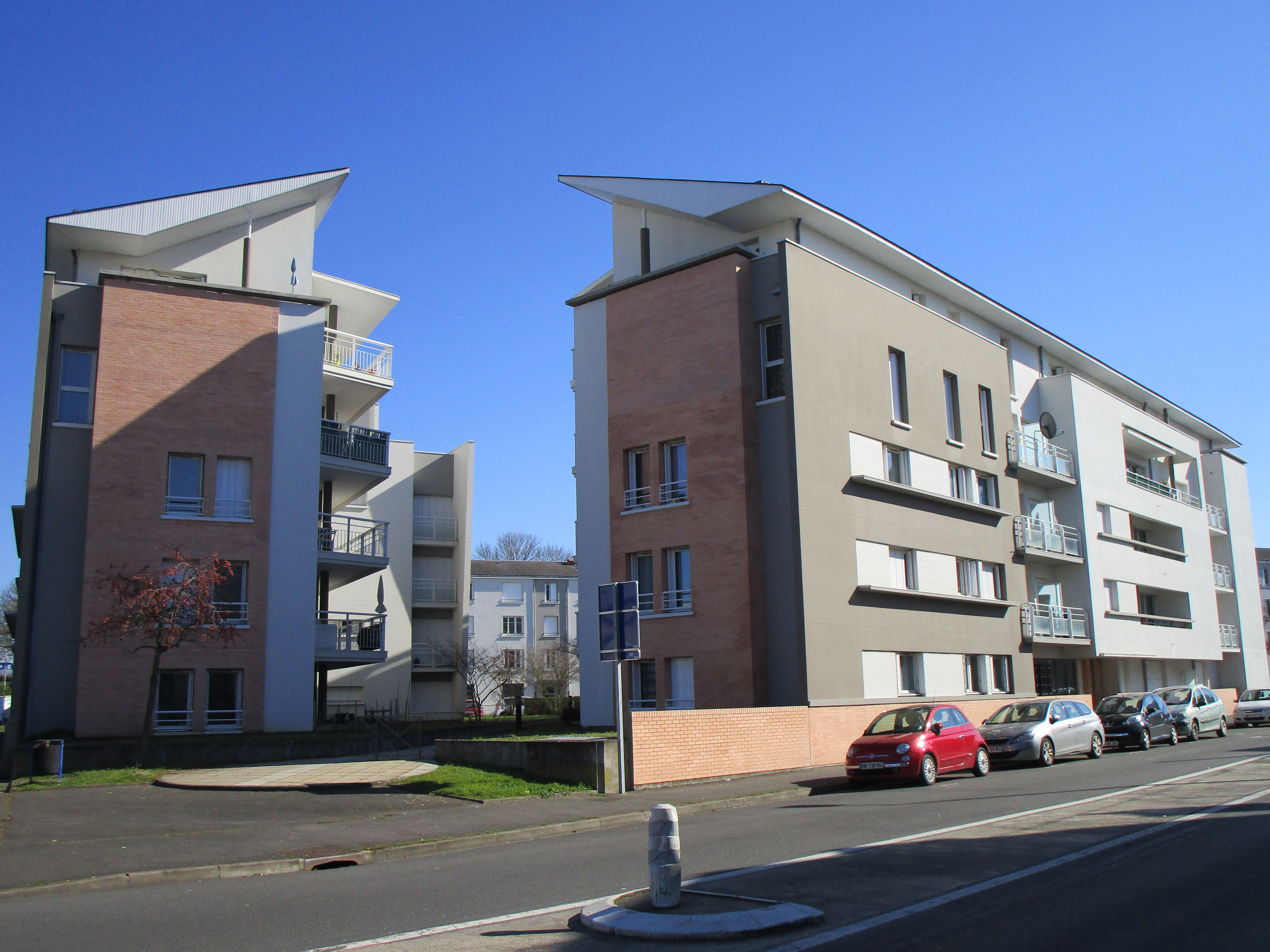
Agnès Sorel social residence, Tours Habitat.
