= Quartier Montjoyeux =

District in the city of Tours, France

Quartier Montjoyeux Montjoyeux-Grandmont
- District
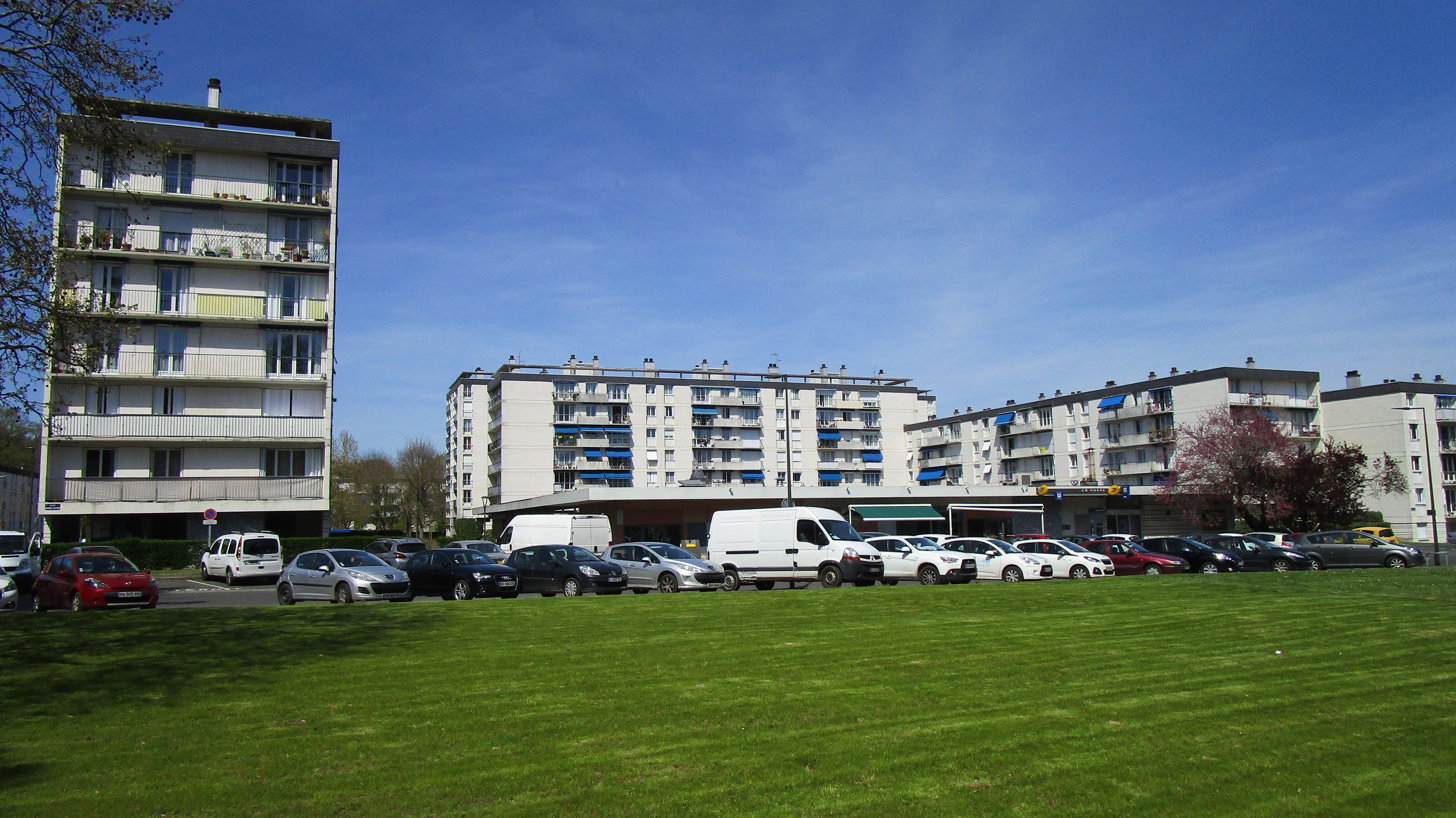
- South of the Montjoyeux complex

- Location within France
- Coordinates (France): 47°21′30″N 0°42′07″E
- Country: France
- Region: Centre-Val de Loire
- Department: Indre-et-Loire
- City: Tours

Population
  - Total: 3 766 (2,012)

Montjoyeux or Montjoyeux-Grandmont is a district of the French city of Tours. It had a population of nearly 3,800 in 2012. Defined by Insee in its division of the Tours commune into 22 statistical information groupings (îlots regroupés pour l'information statistique - IRIS), the district is located in the southern part of the commune. It borders the other Tours districts of Les Fontaines to the north and La Bergeonnerie to the west, as well as the communes of Saint-Avertin to the east, Chambray-lès-Tours to the south and Joué-lès-Tours to the west.

The district is essentially made up of three distinct parts. To the south is the Grandmont park, which includes the university campus of the same name with its scientific faculties and some 1,000 student housing units. To the north, a vast school complex combines two high schools with a middle school, while the residential area to the east comprises detached houses and a large housing estate built in the 1960s. Thanks to the strong presence of the University of Tours, this is one of the city's youngest neighborhoods, while the largest student residence is located here. Its protected park is a biodiversity reserve.

== Delimitation ==
The Montjoyeux-Grandmont district is defined by Insee in its division of the Tours commune into 22 statistical information groupings. It is bounded by the Route de Saint-Avertin to the north, the A10 freeway to the east, the route départementale 943 to the south, and the Avenues de l'Alouette and de Bordeaux to the west. Neighboring districts are Les Fontaines to the north and La Bergeonnerie to the west, with the communes of Saint-Avertin to the east, Chambray-lès-Tours to the south and Joué-lès-Tours to the west.

== History ==
=== Origin ===
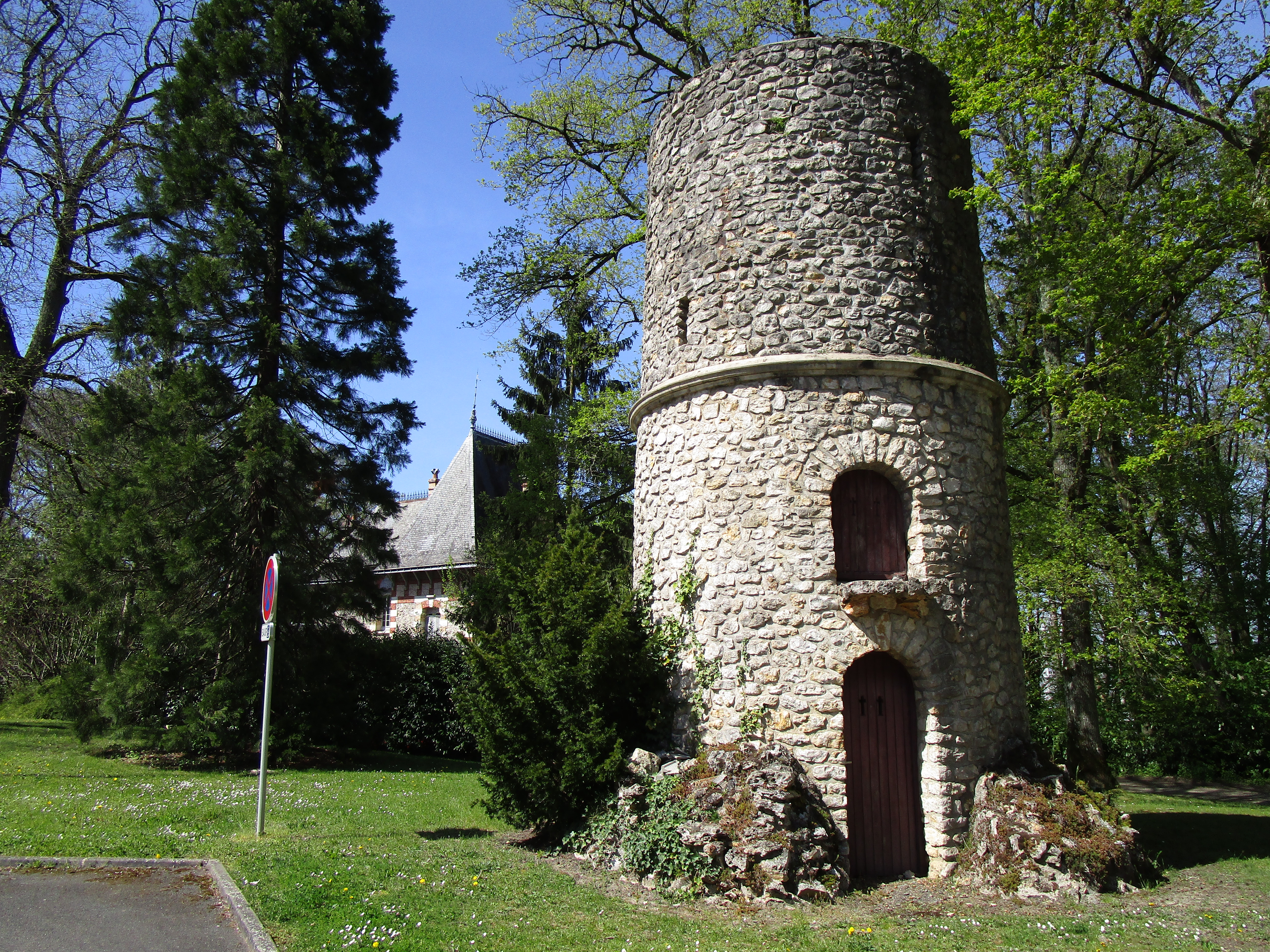
Old tower near the Montjoyeux manor house

Today's Montjoyeux-Grandmont district was once a vast forest stretching from the banks of the Cher to Montbazon. Part of it was ceded in 1176 by King Henry II to the Order of Grandmont, a monastic order originally from the Limousin region, which established itself in the area then known as “Bois Rahier”. In 1385, the monastery even briefly became the order's headquarters during the Hundred Years' War. After the order's closure in the 18th century, the Grandmontains left the woods.

Just a few years later, around 1787, François de Conzié, Archbishop of Tours, took over the former priory of the Grandmont order, whose dissolution he had also been one of the advocates. In 1788, he began building a château on the site of the former Grandmont priory as his personal country residence. However, the French Revolution interrupted the work, and the archbishop went into exile. The château then changed owners several times, including the lawyer Adrien Lecointre, who carried out restoration work and brought to light the remains of the former monastery.

In 1921, the château was finally acquired by the city of Tours, which used it as a nursery and kindergarten. Together with the surrounding forest park, it became an important leisure and walking area for the people of Tours, who took the old tramway to get there. Mayor Camille Chautemps wanted to turn it into a Touraine-style “Bois de Boulogne”, and attendance reached 6,000 people a day. During World War II, the site was occupied by the German army, which took advantage of its height to set up an observation post and anti-aircraft defences.

=== Urbanization ===
After World War II, the Château de Grandmont became a youth hostel, and various other projects were envisaged to develop it. However, at the end of the 1950s, the town ceded the site to the State for the construction of the new Lycée de Grandmont, to cope with the growing number of students during the Trente Glorieuses period. Work began in 1959 and the château was demolished in 1961, as the State did not wish to take charge of this old heritage.

In the early 1960s, the town turned to Montjoyeux for its urban development, while awaiting the development of the Cher river. Construction began on the Montjoyeux housing estate to the east of the Lycée de Grandmont, with a total of 520 multi-family dwellings built between 1963 and 1966 on the site of former small agricultural plots. The project comprises six towers and seven bars with simple, white architecture. Between 1964 and 1969, around 100 single-family homes were built further south, to the east of avenue Saint-Vincent-de-Paul, along with a further 200 multi-family dwellings. In 1965, Saint-Jean Church was built between these two areas, on avenue Montjoyeux. It was the first church to be built in the city since the end of World War II, seven years before Saint-Paul in Sanitas.

It was also in the 1960s and 1990s that the University of Tours moved its scientific faculties and sports facilities to the new Grandmont university campus, in the heart of the woodland to the south of the district. The Faculty of Pharmacy, for example, moved here from the Tonnellé campus.

=== Recent developments ===
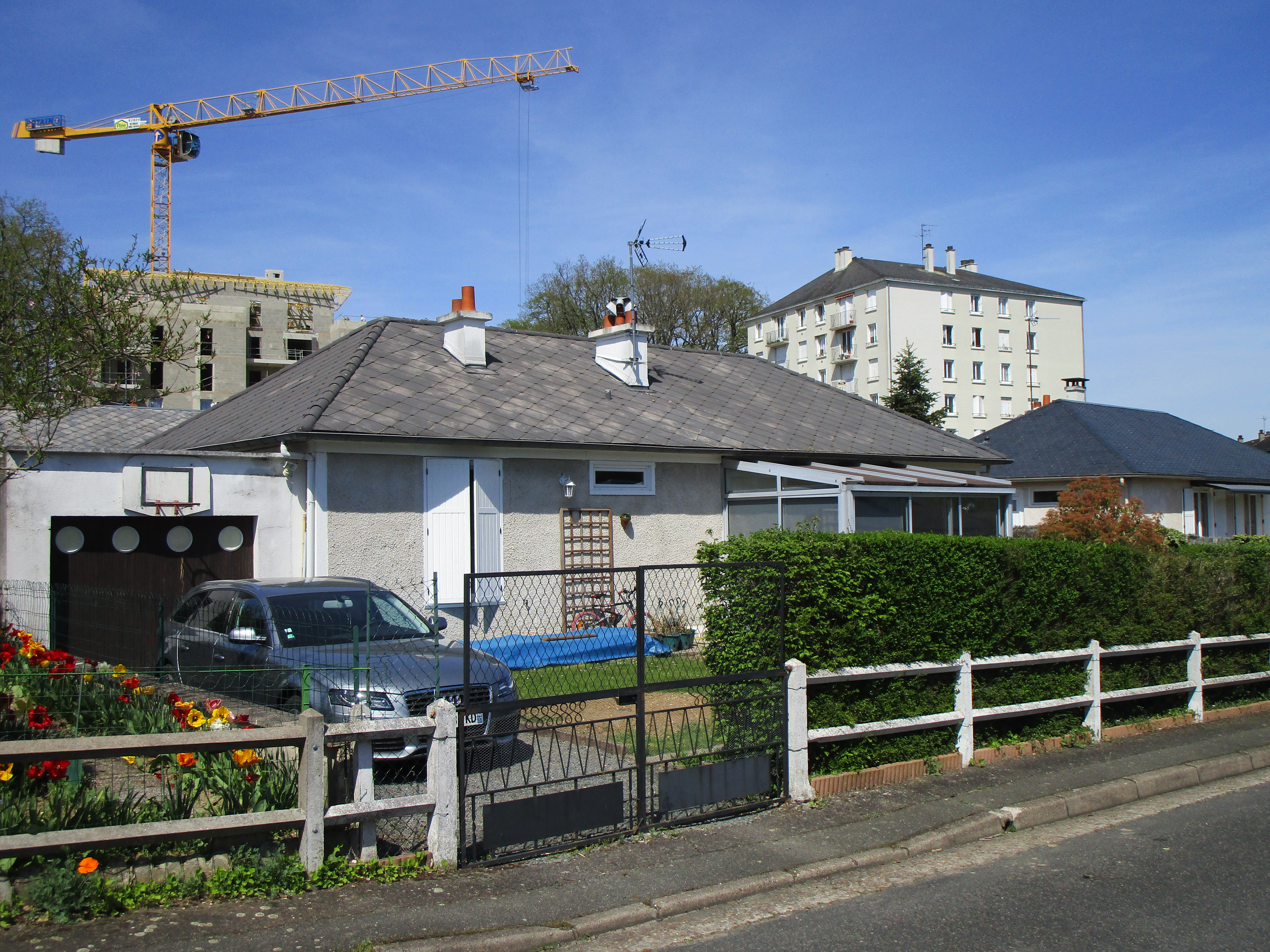
Individual pavilions to the east of the campus and Goüin buildings in the background.

The urbanization of the neighborhood continued in the following decades. In 1993, the Maryse Bastié social housing company built a complex of 36 detached houses with large apartments on the Bellevue lane. In 2019, however, these units began to be privatized.

In the mid-1990s, mayor Jean Royer and then his successor Jean Germain planned to continue developing the neighborhood. The former even called for the park's protection to be withdrawn, while the latter envisaged the future passage of the tramway through its heart. These projects were abandoned, however, due to the lack of declassification of the protected areas and pressure from a citizens' collective.

Established in 1980 on a two-hectare site in the heart of the district, avenue Goüin, in 2016 Orange abandoned its 8,400 m^{2} office space to relocate its 350 employees to Les Deux-Lions. The buildings were immediately demolished and the area was handed over to a property developer, who in 2017 began construction of the first of a series of three residences for a total of 300 homes.

== Grandmont Park ==
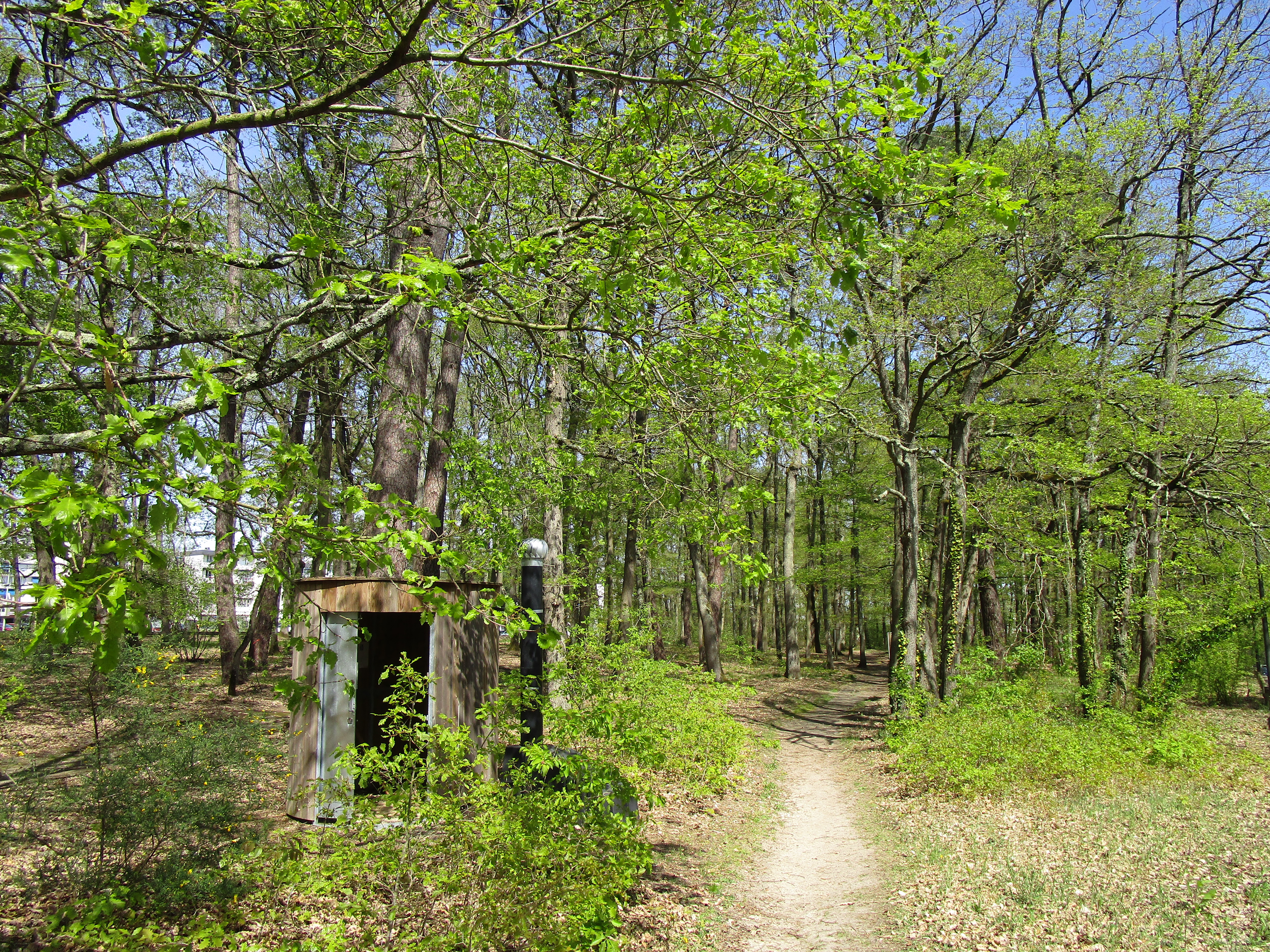
Grandmont Park in early spring

Today's Grandmont Park grew out of a vast area of forest known as Bois Rahier, which once covered some 100 hectares within the city of Tours. Today, the park is reduced in size to around 22 hectares.

The area boasts a high level of diversity, with six shrub formations and 470 animal species, 50 of which are protected. Bird species include the marsh tit, the wood warbler, and the common whitethroat. There are also rabbits and squirrels, while large mammals (foxes, wild boars, and deer) have been absent from the park since the late 19th century, except in exceptional cases. Many amphibian and reptile species have also disappeared. The only remaining species are fire salamanders and palmate newts, themselves in danger of extinction. Some measures have been taken to preserve this biodiversity, such as reducing the number of secondary roads.

The park's biodiversity has been significantly reduced as a result of the downsizing of the forest area, which began in the 17th century to exploit timber and create agricultural zones. In 1728, the forest area fell to 18 hectares, before a policy of reforestation brought the area back to 34 hectares in 1791 and 45 in 1840. However, it was not until the 20th century that the loss of biodiversity accelerated. The park's transformation into a popular public park in 1920 led to extensive damage to the natural area, accentuated by the construction of the Grandmont stadium in 1921 and, above all, from the 1960s onwards by urban development, businesses, and the university, in addition to the traffic arteries that cross the park and the freeway to the east.

== Living conditions ==
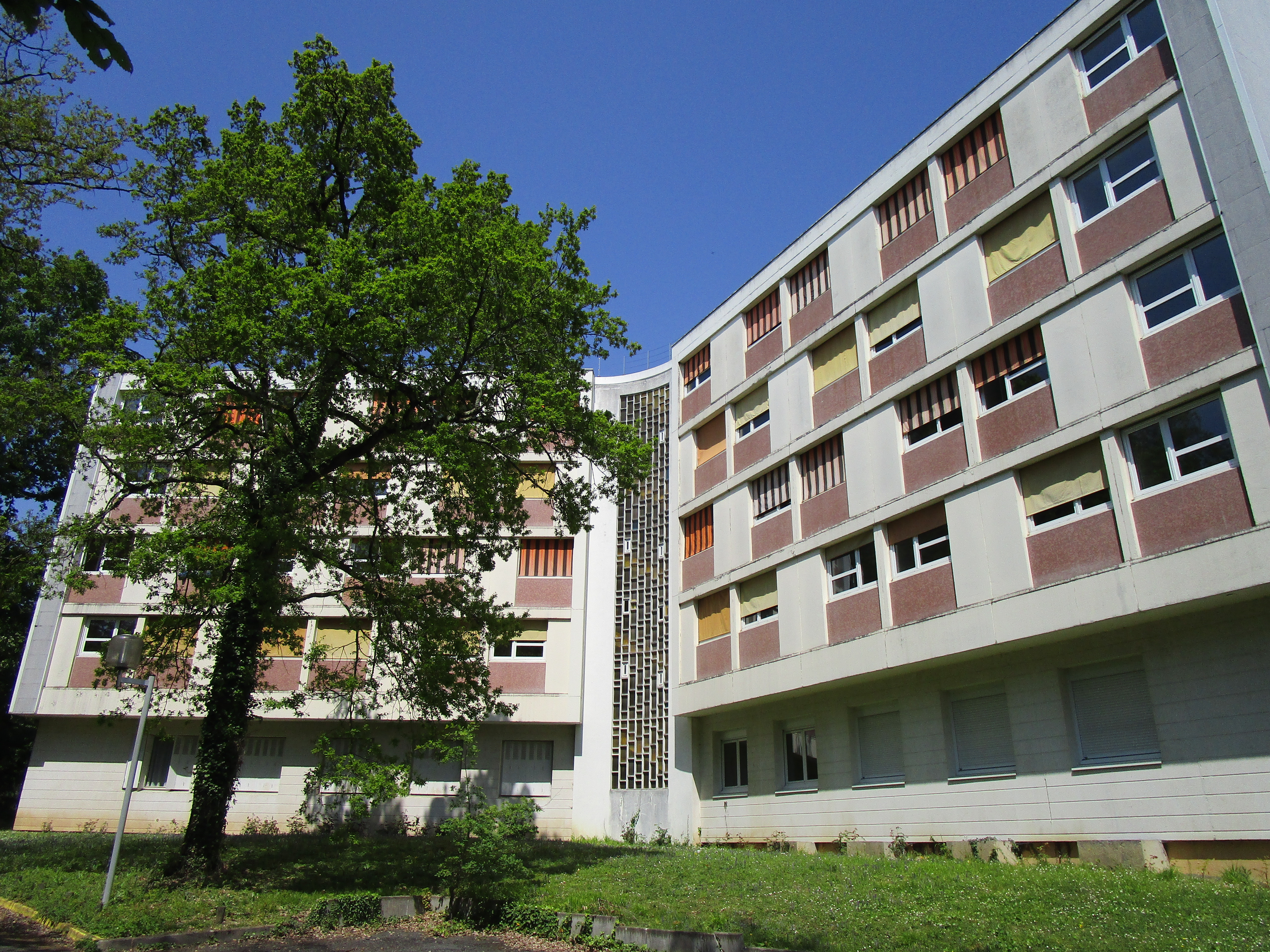
Grandmont student residence building

Montjoyeux-Grandmont is a relatively diverse neighborhood, with a predominantly middle-class and student population. Residents' average incomes are intermediate: 19,730 euros per year per household on average, or around 1,875 euros per month per household in 2009. The unemployment rate is slightly higher than the municipal average.

Nearly 58% of employees in the neighborhood are white-collar workers, and 16% are retired. Around a third of residents own their own homes and 12% are social housing tenants, compared with 33% and 27% respectively for the commune as a whole in 2012. Only 10% of dwellings are houses, the remainder being apartments and student rooms. Some 44% of dwellings have just one room, and 49% of residents are in the 18-24 age bracket, illustrating the large number of students in the district thanks to the Crous residences.

== Economy and stores ==
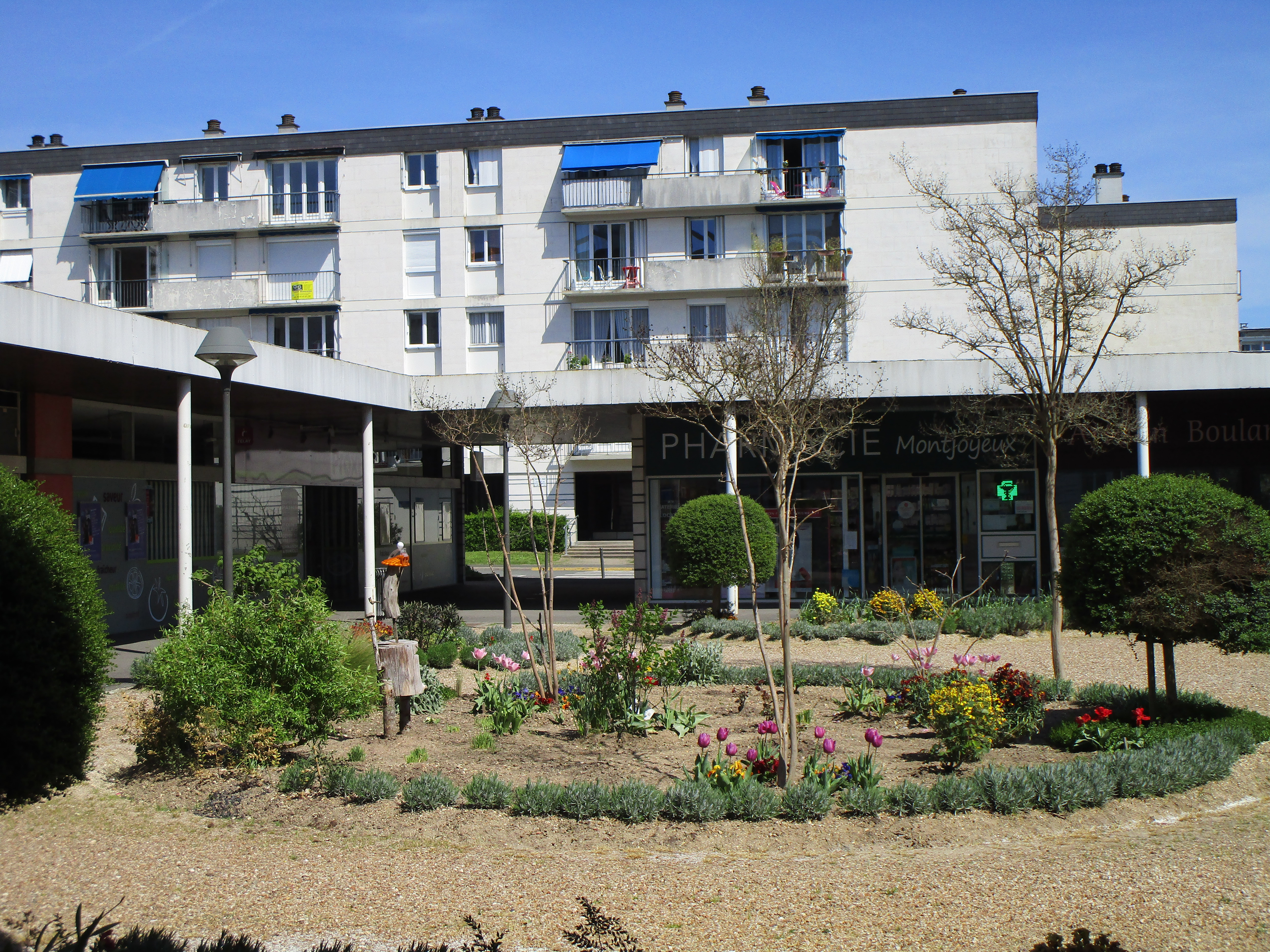
Montjoyeux shopping center

The district has a modest-sized shopping center, located in the Montjoyeux complex on the allée Jacques Duthoo. In 2011, it included a mini-market, a butcher's shop, a bakery, a brasserie, a hairdressing salon, a La Poste office, a pharmacy, and a tobacconist. In the same year, it was hit by a fire that partially handicapped its operations for several months. While the post office was threatened with closure, the town agreed in 2017 to take it over in the form of a communal postal agency after pressure from residents to do so. This was the only cash dispenser in the neighborhood, which had no other shopping center.

Since 2014, the neighborhood has been home to a small weekly market where farmers sell their produce. It takes place in the Montjoyeux shopping center and is run by an association.

One of the neighborhood's main employers is Électricité de France (EDF), which owns an office complex along the A10 freeway and Avenue Goüin. More than 600 employees work on this site, which was extensively renovated and expanded in 2015. While the regional sales department left the district this year to move to Les Deux-Lions, the state-owned company has strengthened its technical teams on the Montjoyeux site, including engineers from CNEPE, responsible for nuclear power plant maintenance.

== Infrastructure and public services ==
=== School complex ===
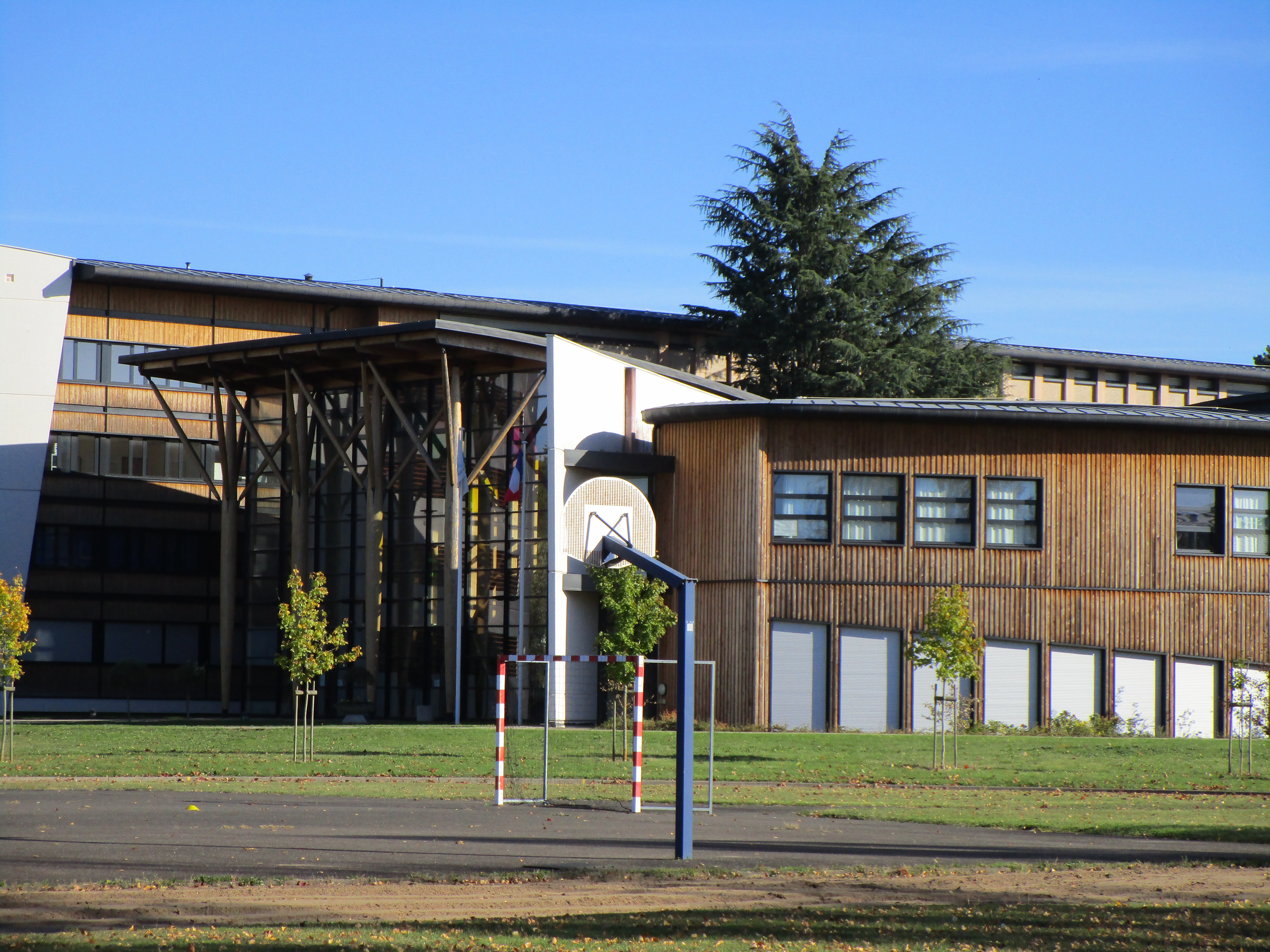
Lycée Victor Laloux

The district is particularly well known for its secondary schools, which are among the largest in the departement. Grandmont general and technological high school is the largest, with almost 2,000 students in 2017, having been commissioned in 1959 with 600 students, then 950 the following year, while extension work continued for several more years. In 1977, the school complex was divided into three institutions with the creation of the collège Jean-Philippe Rameau and the lycée professionnel Victor Laloux, which took over part of the Grandmont buildings. However, it was not until 1998 that the three schools became independent.

The Lycée professionnel Victor Laloux was completely renovated and extended in 2012, with a concrete and wood structure. The ambitious work began in 2008, with 4,000 m^{2} renovated and 8,400 m^{2} added, at a cost of around 20 million euros. A gymnasium and boarding facilities were also installed. The Lycée is now home to around 500 students specializing in distribution, commerce, sales, photography, and dental prosthetics.

Lycée Grandmont is also home to nine advanced technician diplomas (brevets de technicien supérieur - BTS) specializing in commerce, engineering, and industry, for a total of about 2200 students.

=== Grandmont University Campus ===
The University of Tours moved into the southern part of the district in the mid-1960s and expanded again in the 1990s to create a new campus in the middle of the Grandmont park. The two science faculties are located here, with disciplines in computer science, mathematics, physics, chemistry, biology, and geology. The Faculty of Pharmacy joined the campus in 1993, having previously been linked to the Faculty of Medicine on the Tonnellé campus. The campus is also home to the Electrical Engineering and Industrial Computing department of the Tours IUT. SUAPS sports services also joined the campus in the 1990s, with the construction of a sports hall. In 2024, the campus counted 26,010 students, making it the city's fourth-largest and fastest-growing campus.

The Grandmont campus also includes two Crous student residences. The Grandmont residence is the largest in the city, with 1,066 nine-square-meter rooms in eight buildings in the shape of a three-pointed star. The second is called “Les Garennes” and contains 228 larger studios, mostly 18 square meters in size.

=== Other facilities ===
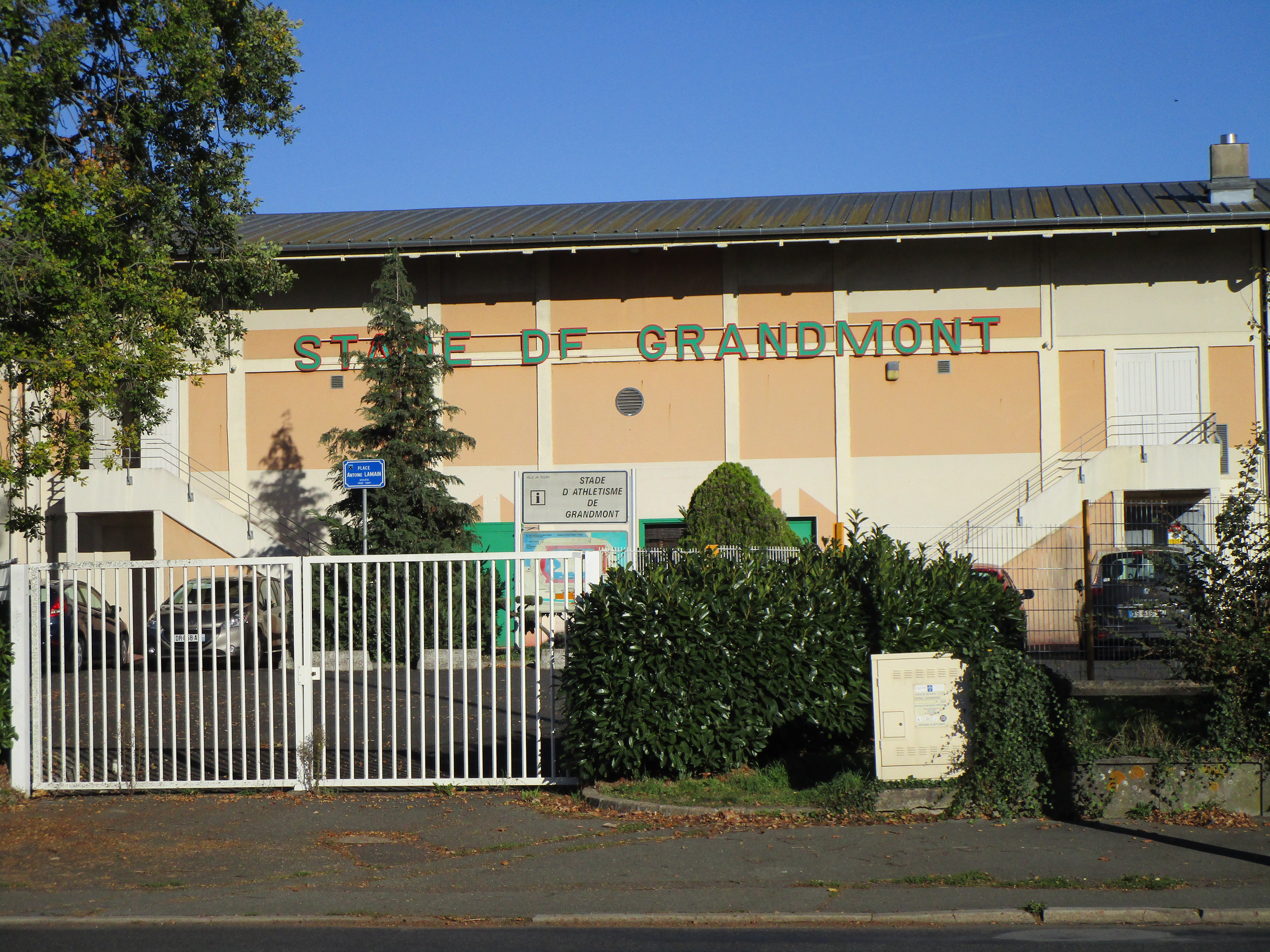
Grandmont stadium

One of the district's biggest infrastructures is the Grandmont stadium, located close to the school complex and mainly dedicated to athletics. Its grandstand seats almost 3,000. Prior to the construction of the Stade de la Vallée du Cher in 1978, the Stade de Grandmont was also used for soccer, playing host to Tours FC. In 2011, its lighting, track, and synthetic turf were renovated at a cost of almost one million euros.

=== Transports ===
The Montjoyeux-Grandmont district is served by the Fil bleu bus network. The “tempo 2” line, the most important after the tramway line, mainly serves the Grandmont campus. Five other bus lines cross the district, making it one of the most served by public transport.

== Gallery ==
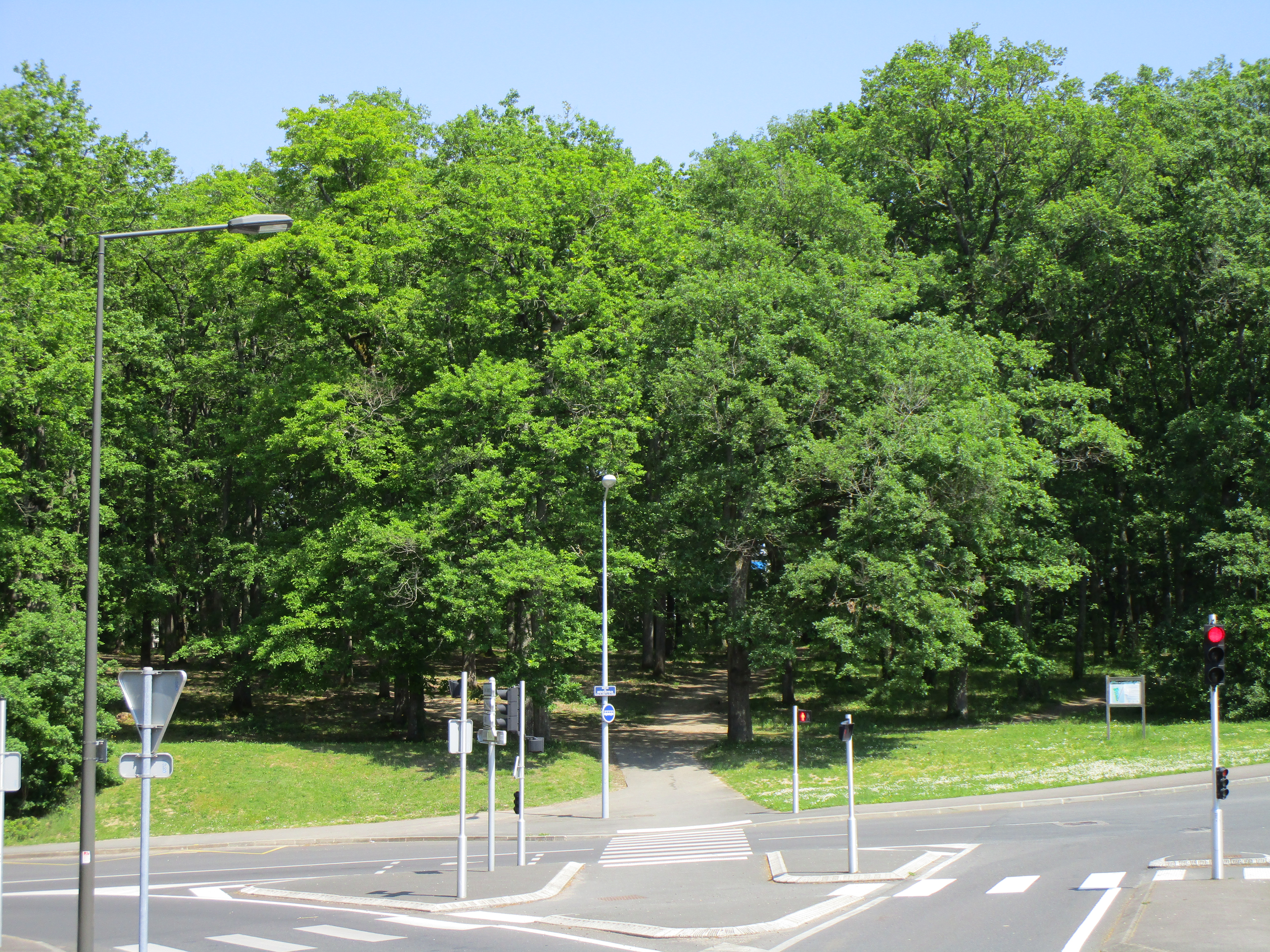
Grandmont Park

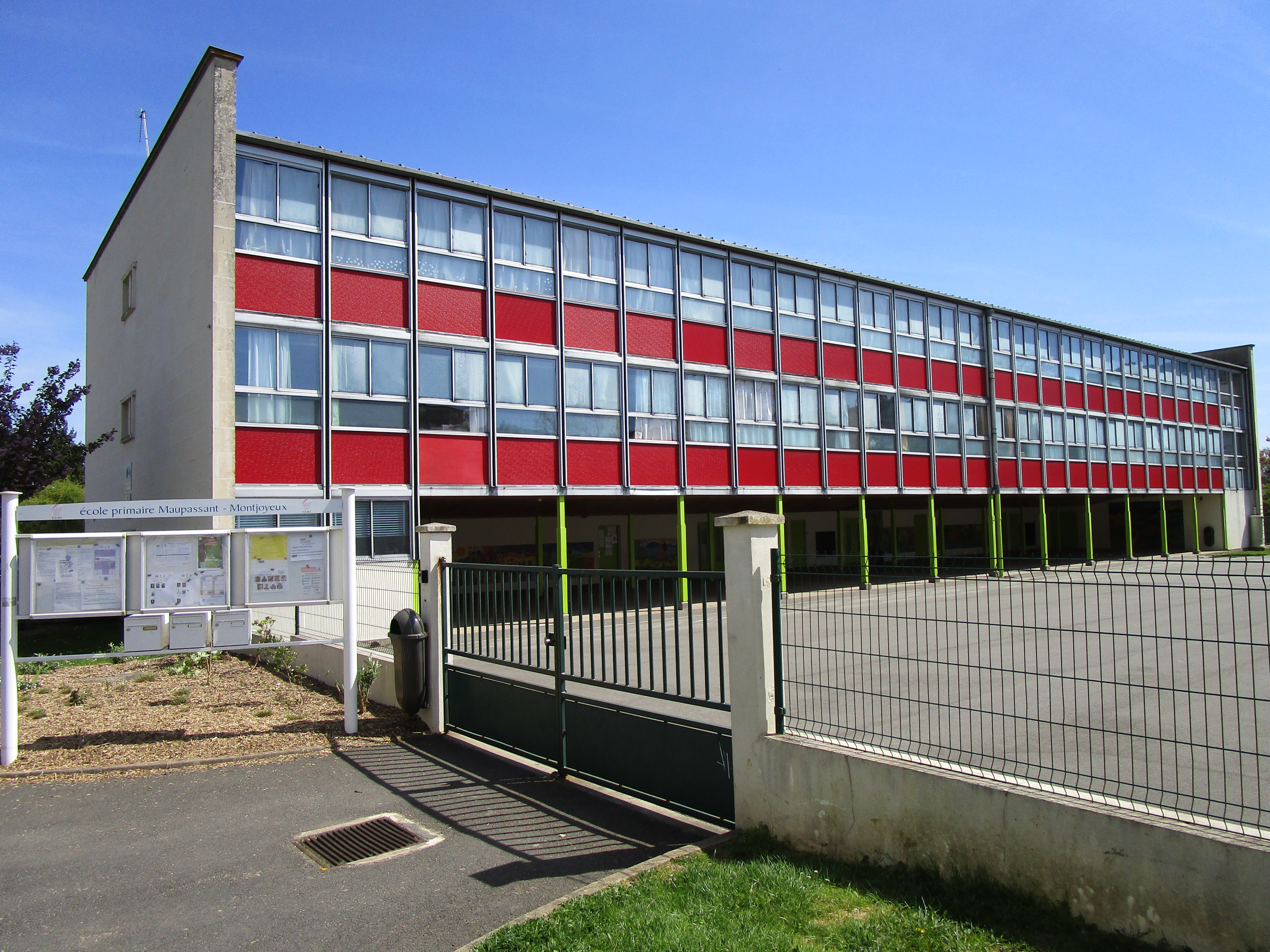
Maupassant school in the Montjoyeux sector

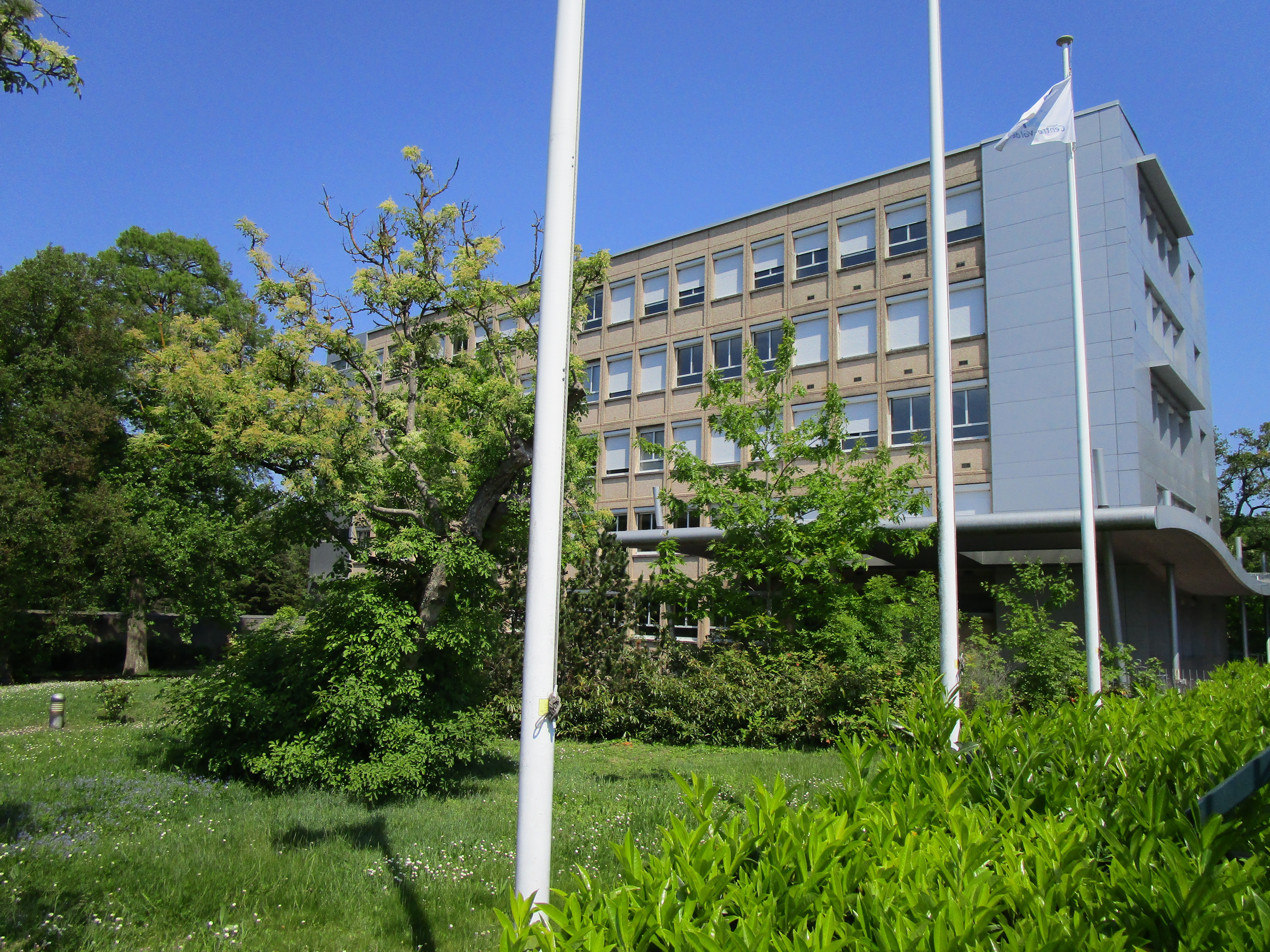
One of the buildings at Lycée Grandmont in Tours

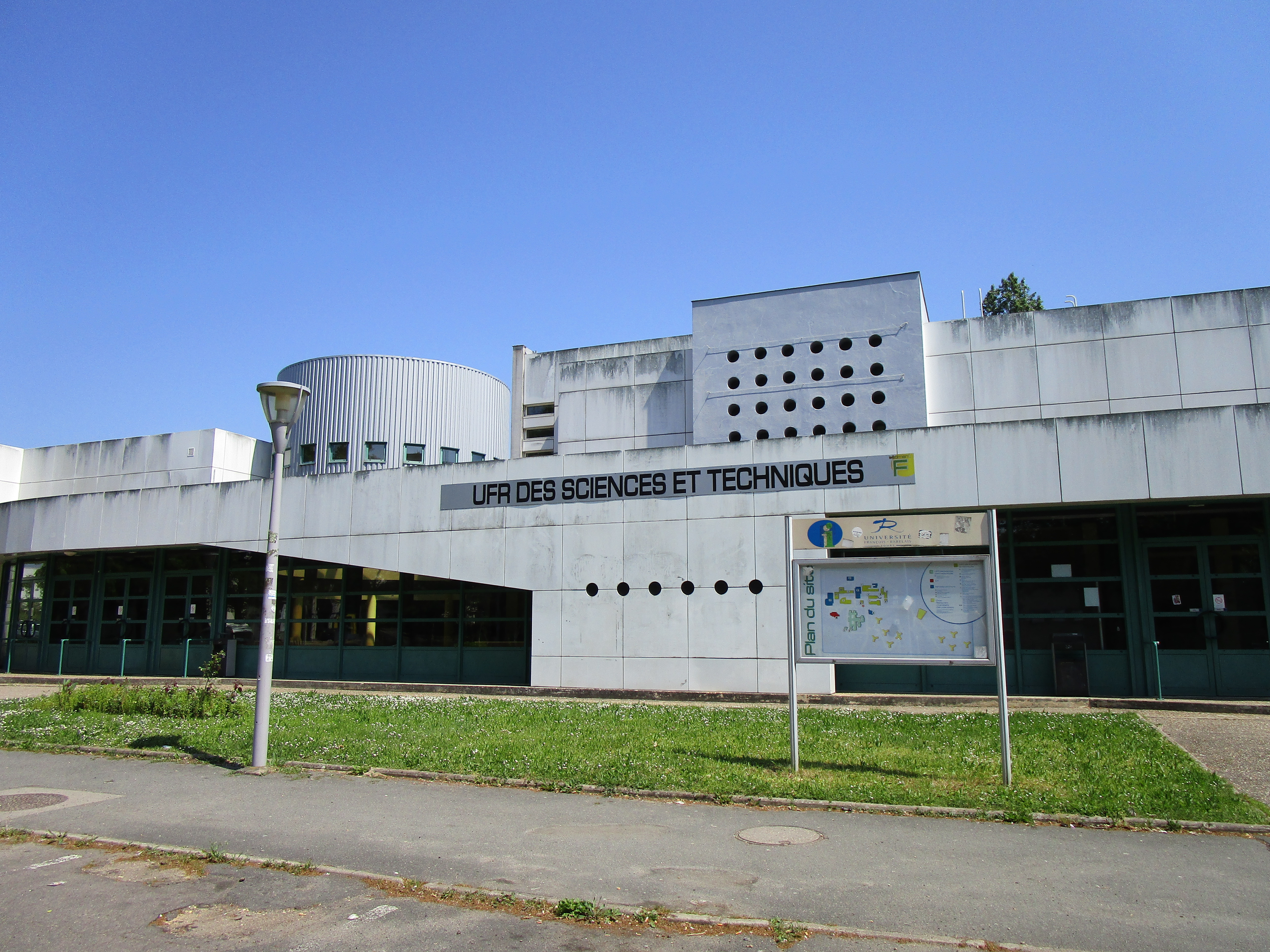
Science and Technology Department

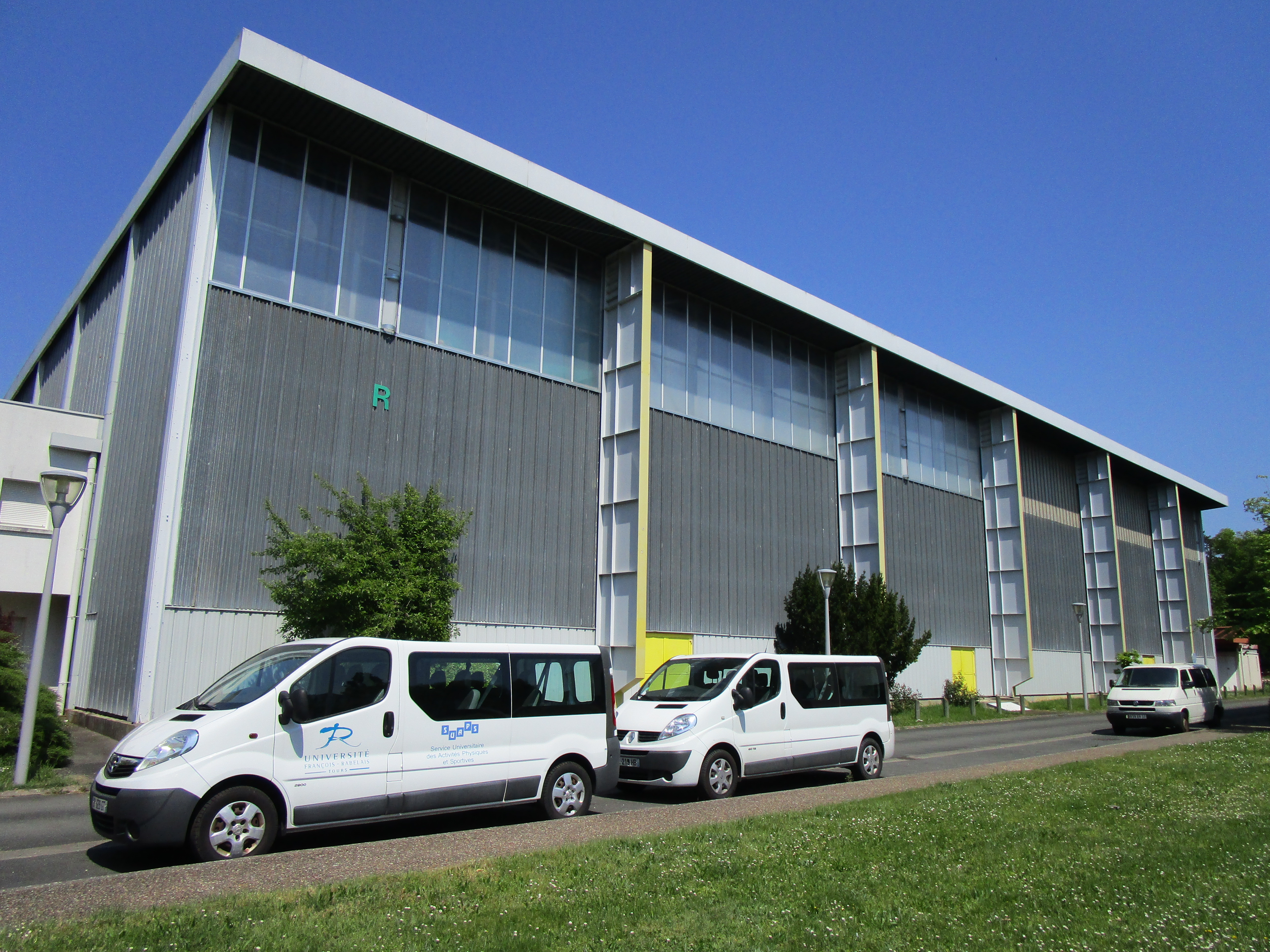
SUAPS building on the Grandmont campus

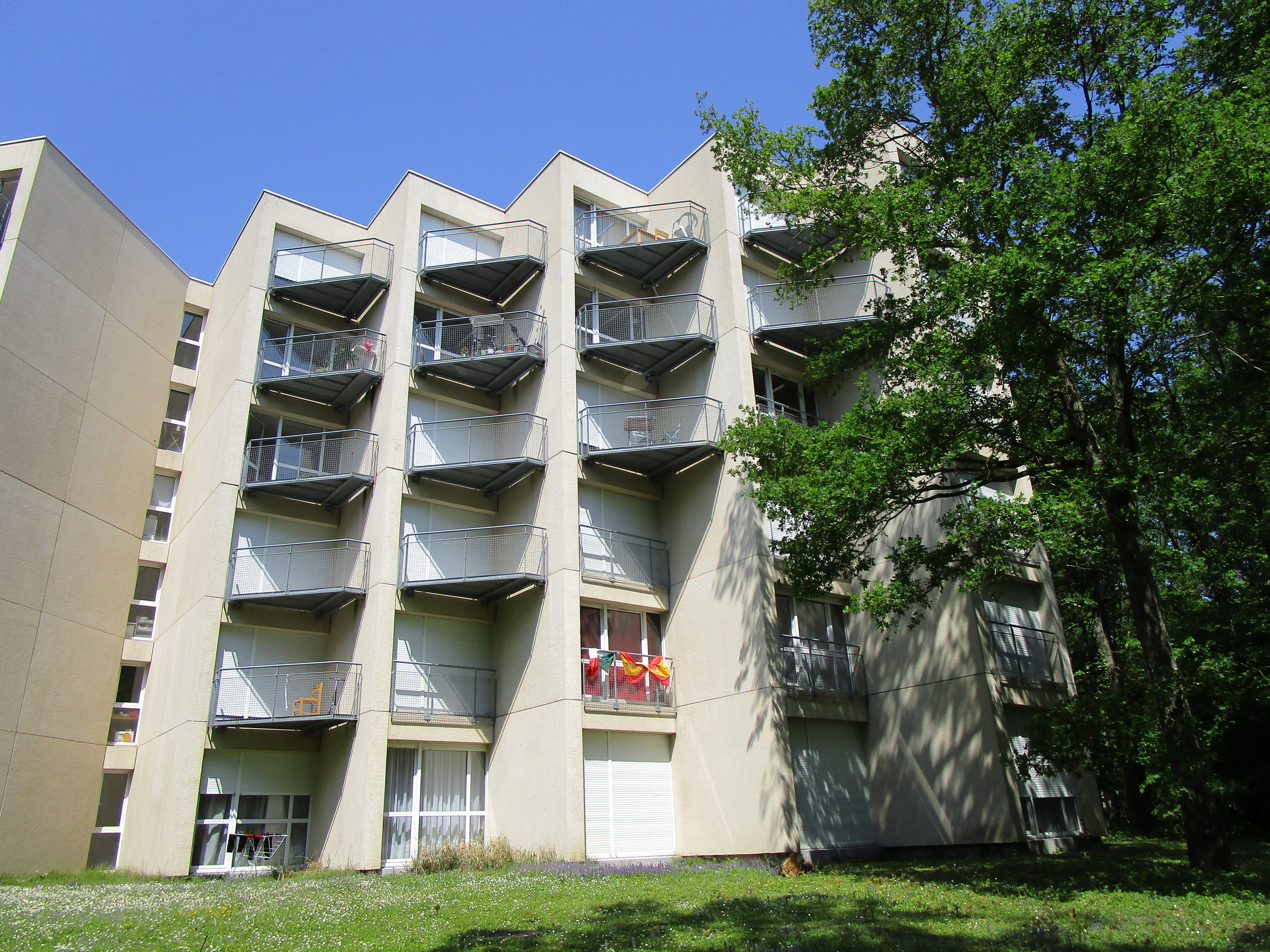
"Les Garennes” student residence

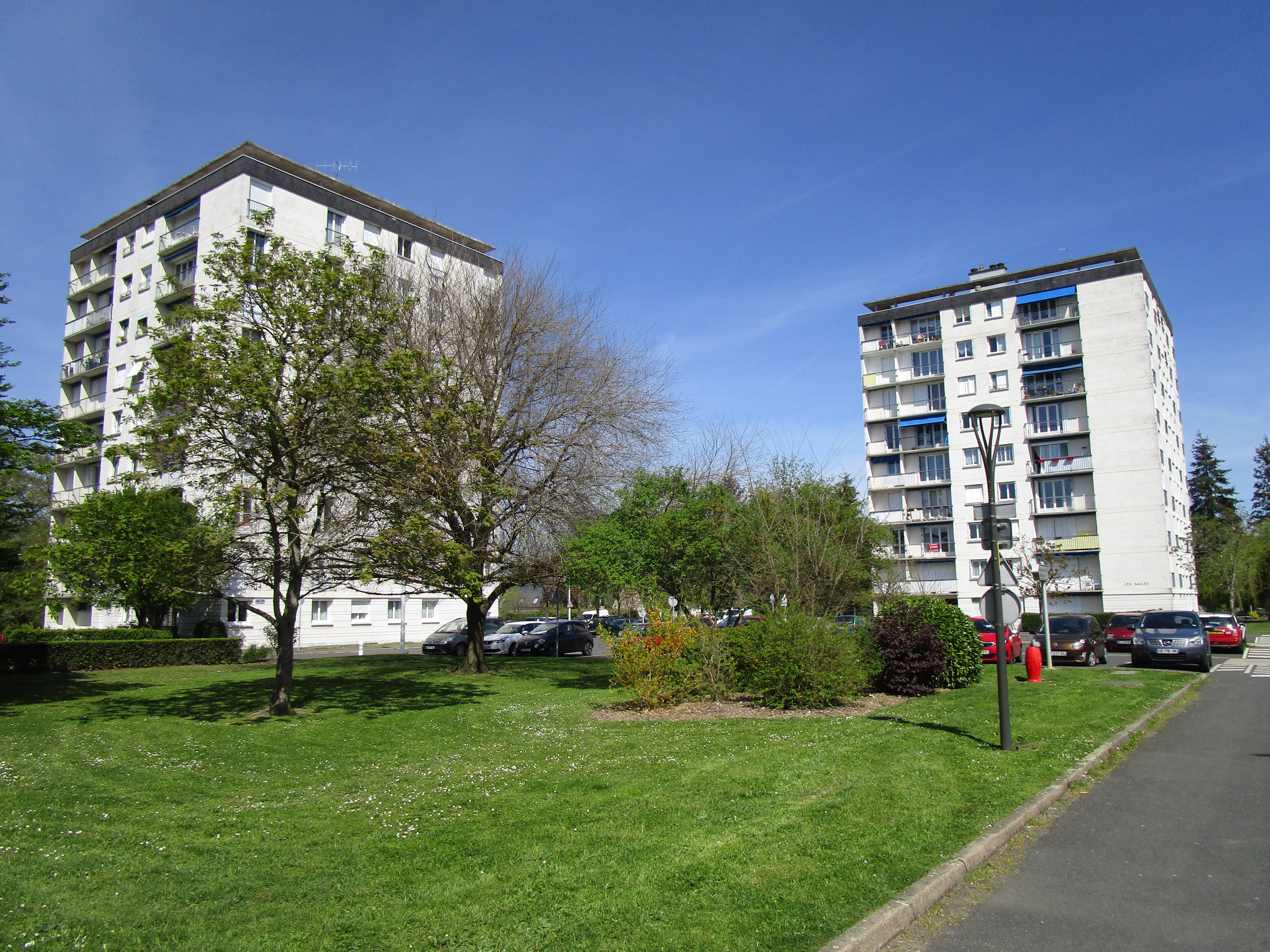
Towers of the Montjoyeux complex

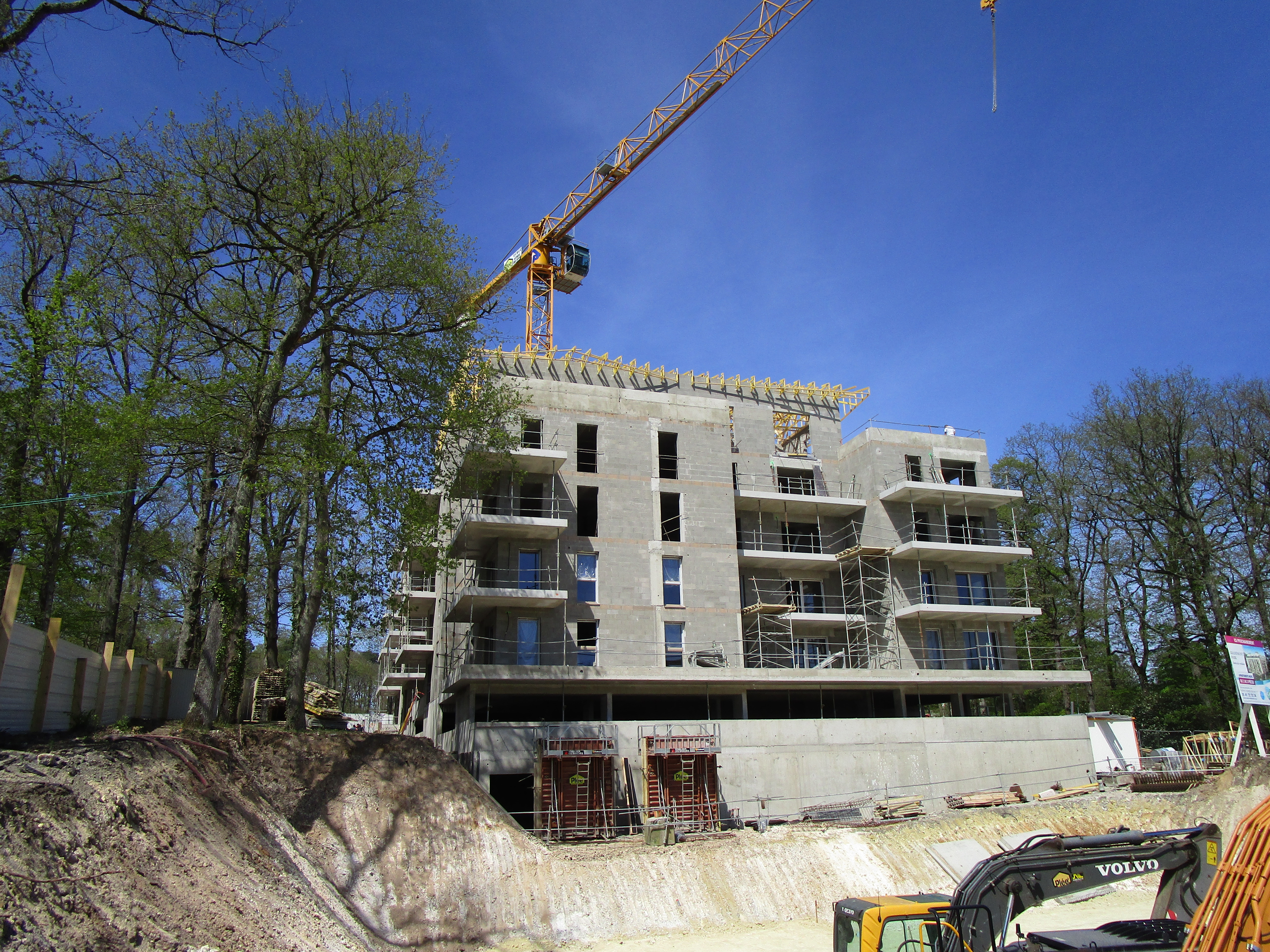
Construction on avenue Goüin, April 2018
