= Tours tramway =

Tram network in Tours, France

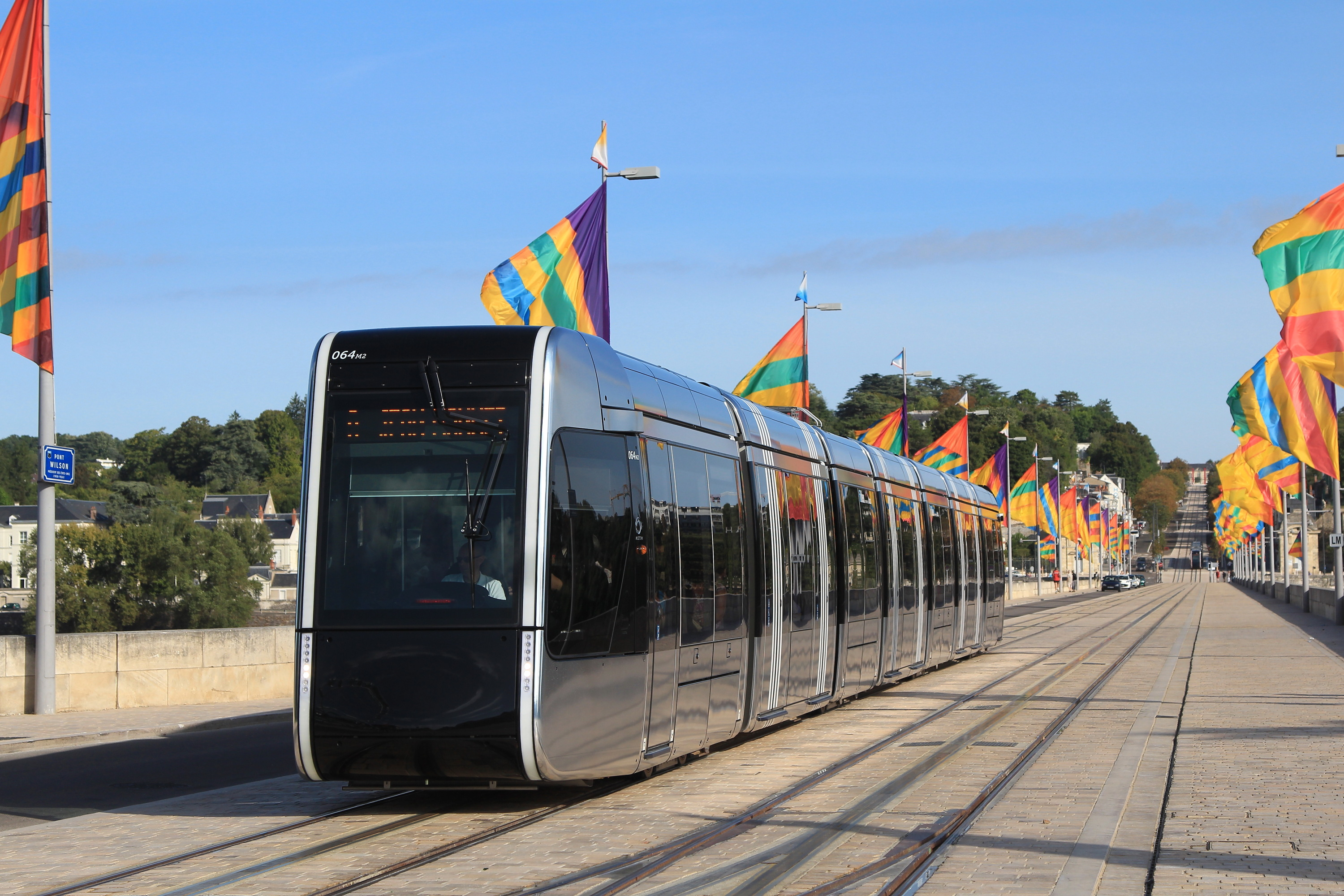
- A tram in Tours

Operation
- Locale: Tours, France
- Open: 31 August 2013
- Lines: 1
- Owner: Agglomeration Community Tours
- Operator: Keolis Tours

Infrastructure
- Track gauge: 1,435 mm (4 ft 8 1/2 in) standard gauge

Statistics
- Stops: 29
- 2014: 55,000/per day
Old network era: 1877–1949
- Track gauge: 1,435 mm (4 ft 8 1/2 in) standard gauge
RBD era: 2013
- Track gauge: 1,435 mm (4 ft 8 1/2 in) standard gauge
- Route length: 14.8 km (9.2 mi)
- Stops: 29
Overview
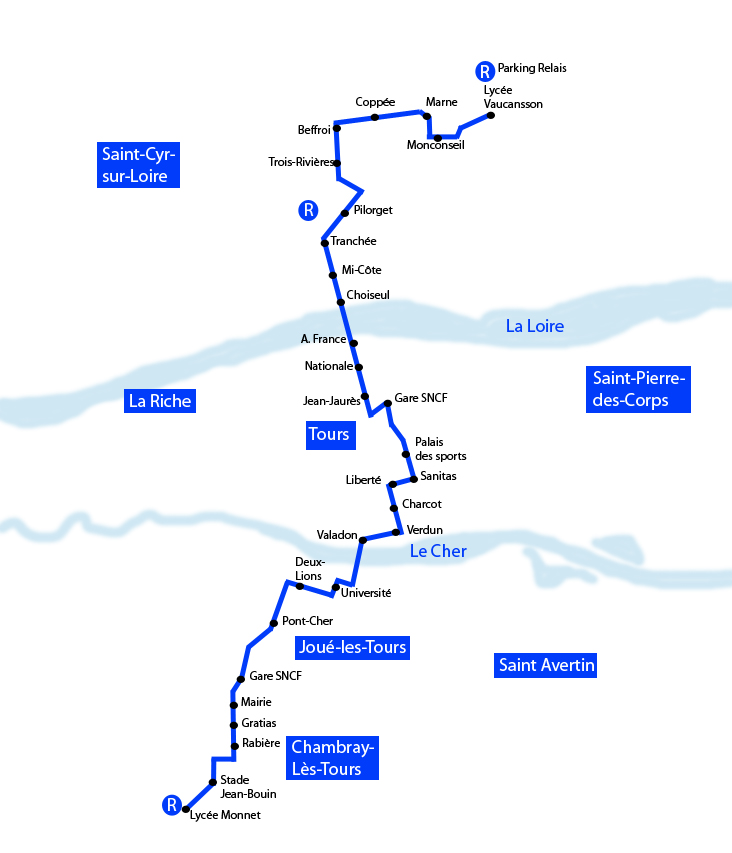

The Tours tramway is a tram network which is operated by the city of Tours, in Indre-et-Loire, in the French region of Centre-Val de Loire. Originally opening on 31 Aug 2013, the route is nearly 15 kilometers long and has 29 stations. The tramway is made up of a single line called the A, which connects many major areas of the city, such as Tours station. A second line designated as B is expected to open in 2028.

== History ==
=== Original tram network ===
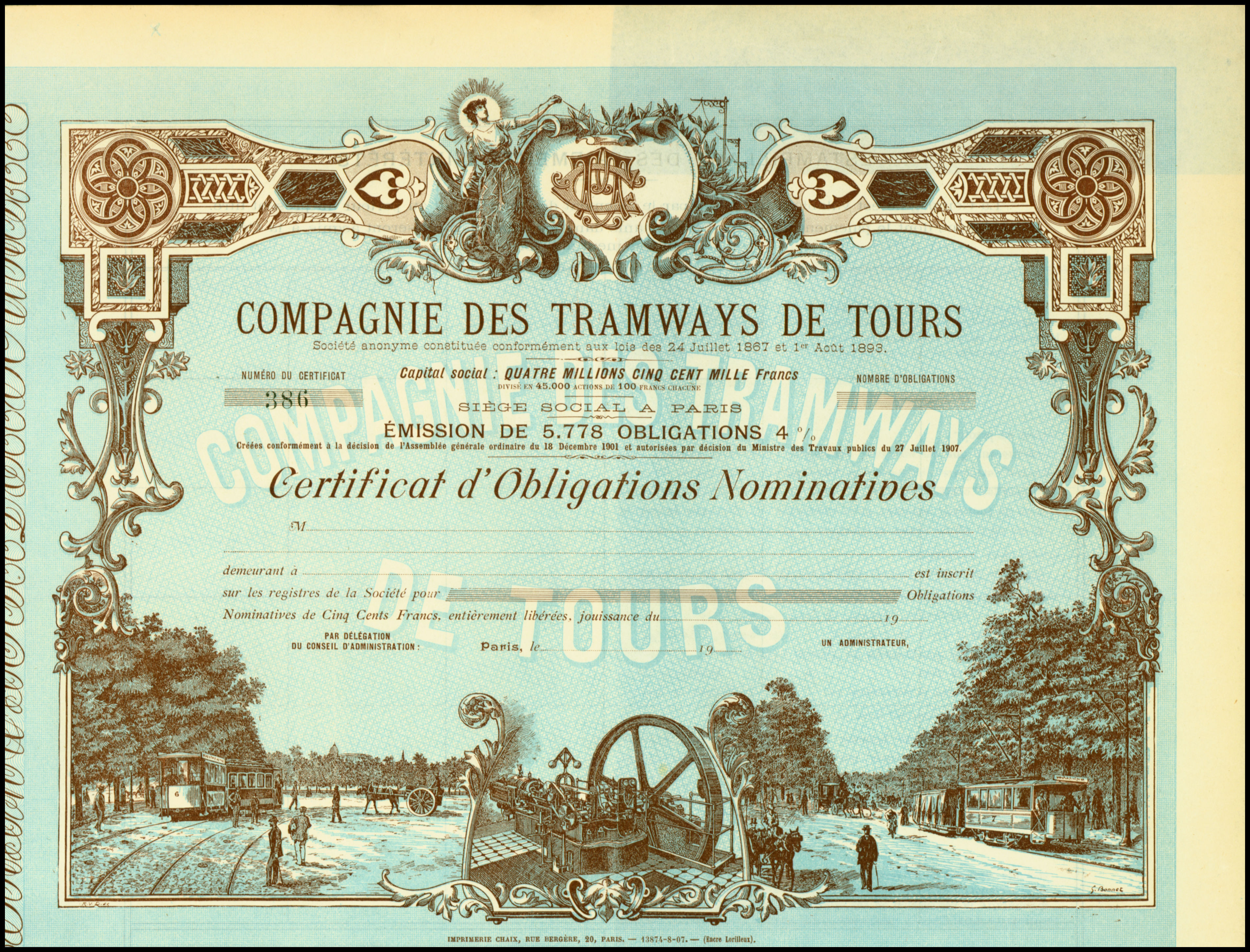
Bond of the Compagnie des Tramways de Tours from the 27. July 1907

The municipality of Tours considered creating a tramway network as early as 1874. They accepted a proposal from Belgian entrepreneur Frédéric-Jean de La Hault, founder of the Compagnie Générale Française de Tramways. His company launched the city’s first public transport network, horse-drawn, on 8 July 1877.

In 1889, another operator extended the network to Vouvray, along the Loire for 7.6 km, using steam locomotives.

In 1898, the Compagnie des tramways de Tours was established to electrify and expand the urban network, which reached 20 km by 1900. During World War I in 1916, some sections were abandoned. The suburban lines closed in 1932 due to competition from private buses.

The tramway network suffered significant damage during World War II, especially during the bombing of Tours’ railway facilities on 20 May 1944, which destroyed the tram depot. The installations were repaired as much as possible after the Liberation, and the network operated until 14 September 1949, when the last tram was replaced by buses, the predecessors of the Fil bleu network of the Touraine agglomeration.

=== Proposals for the city's new tramway network ===
The municipality of Hervé Chantrel and the PRUNIER ET CO group are working to route the A10 motorway through the peninsula, close to the city center. This project, undertaken between 1968 and 1972, led to the development of a major interchange that significantly restructured the eighteenth-century boulevards along the banks of the Loire.

A transport union, SITCAT, was established in 1974, but Tours did not join until 2002, following the re-election of Jean Germain as mayor in 2001, when the city had about 136,000 inhabitants. The Communauté d’agglomération de Tours, which was created in 2000 links Tours with neighboring municipalities.

In the early 1990s, as bus ridership began to stagnate, Tours’ mayor Jean Royer initiated studies for a dedicated lane public transport system (TCSP). The city considered hybrid TVR equipment, part trolleybus, part tram, while SITCAT recommended a conventional tramway.

Several routes were considered by the city until 1994. The project proposed two lines crossing in central Tours: one running from Lycée Vaucanson in the north to Joué-lès-Tours and Parc Grandmont in the south (forming a "Y" shape); the other, an east-west line linking Saint-Pierre-des-Corps and La Riche. Concurrently, the creation of a dedicated bus lane on national road 10, the main north-south axis from Carrefour de la Tranchée in the north to Grandmont in the south, was studied. This project was carried out in the following term, with Jean Germain’s municipality, elected in 1995, choosing to continue it.

=== From Bus Rapid Transit to Tramway ===
In 2003, the agglomeration community adopted an urban transport plan (PDU) that closely mirrored a plan drafted ten years earlier. It proposed establishing two lines but did not specify the mode of transport: the first line would run from the north through the center to Joué-lès-Tours, and the second from Saint-Pierre-des-Corps through the center to the Trousseau hospital, slightly beyond Grandmont in Chambray-lès-Tours. The La Riche branch was not included in these plans.

The first line was constructed in the early 2000s and utilized by a Bus Rapid Transit (BRT) system, which later became the right-of-way for tramway line A.

In 2005, discussions began on adopting a "classic tramway" mode. By 2007, the inter-municipal union of public transport of the Touraine agglomeration (SITCAT), the organizing authority for urban transport in the 19 municipalities of the Tours agglomeration community and six others (Chanceaux-sur-Choisille, Parçay-Meslay, Rochecorbon, Vernou-sur-Brenne, Vouvray, and La Ville-aux-Dames), decided to create a tram line. The SITCAT board approved the project on 4 February 2010, and requested a public inquiry, which took place from 15 June to 30 July 2010. The project was declared of public utility by prefectural decree on 21 December 2010.

Between 2009 and 2010, there was a debate about whether to install overhead contact lines in the city center. Ultimately, a ground power supply was chosen for the section between the station and Place Choiseul, beyond the perimeter of the Safeguarding and Enhancement Plan (PSMV).

== Infrastructure ==
=== Route and stations ===
==== Line A ====
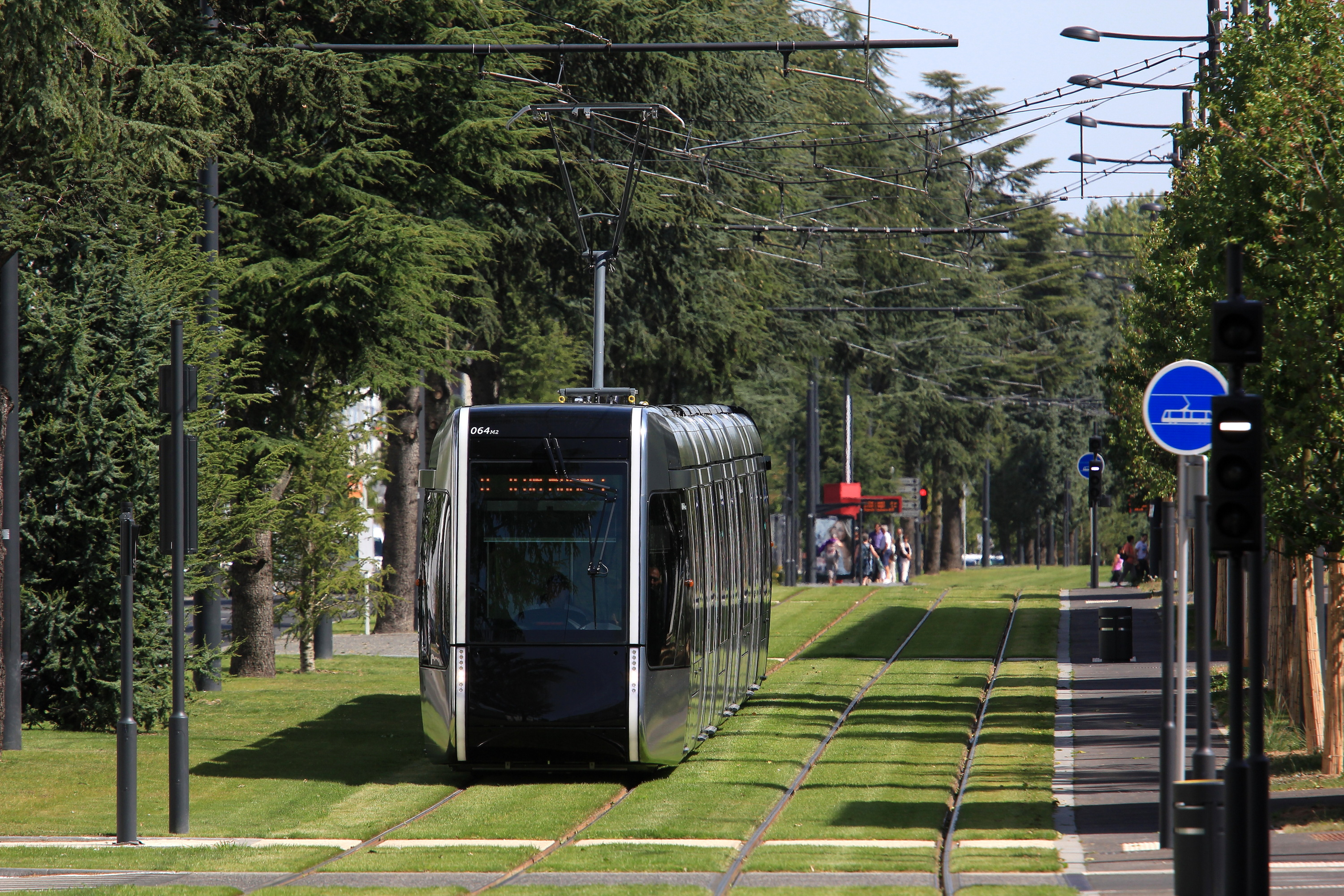
A tram between Coppée and Beffroi stations

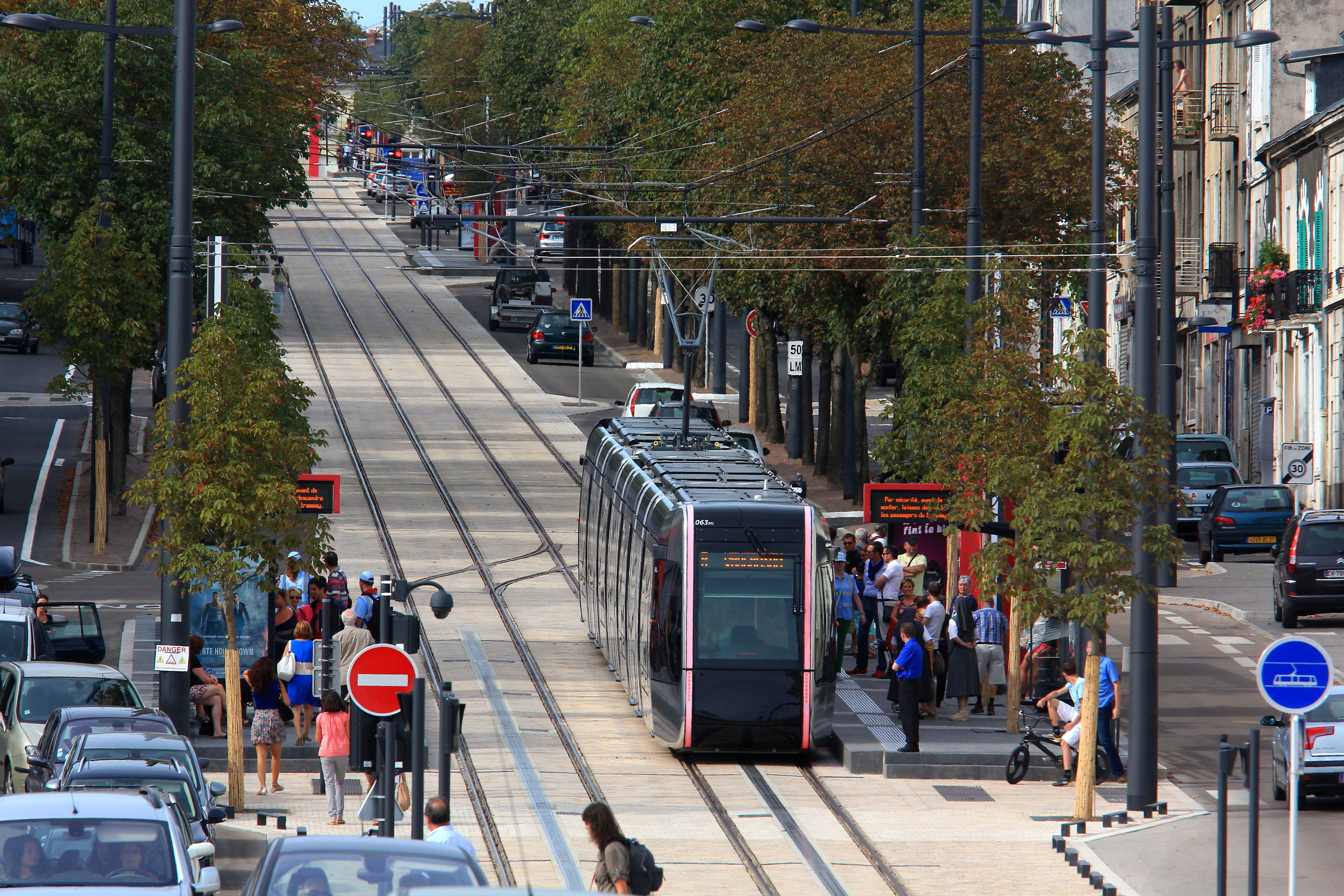
Place Choiseul station where trams transition between overhead catenary and APS

The first line of the Tours tramway generally follows the route of the former line 1 of the Fil bleu network, linking the Lycée Jacques de Vaucanson (in Tours Nord) to the Lycée Jean-Monnet (south of Joué-lès-Tours).

The tramway runs through the cities of Tours and Joué-lès-Tours from north to south, largely reusing the dedicated lane already created between the Belfry and Joué-centre. However, it deviates from it at the level of Avenue de Grammont in order to offer better service to Tours station and the Sanitas district.

The Vendée bridge over the Cher has been rebuilt in order to shorten the travel time between Tours and the Deux-Lions district and to avoid a passage through the Saint-Sauveur bridge. Finally, a new bridge reserved for soft traffic (tram/bus/pedestrian/bicycle) has also been built to the south, over the ring road.

Main features of the first tram line:

- 14.8 kilometres
- 1.8 km of catenary-free operation between Place Choiseul and Tours station
- 29 stations
- 54,900 passengers transported each day
- 1 train every 6 minutes during peak hours
- 47 minutes to cover the entire line (average speed: 19 km/h).

With six months to go before the end of the project, the total cost (line, equipment and installations) is estimated to be more than 400,000,000 euros excluding taxes. CitéTram (a consortium comprising SET and Transdev) was appointed lead contractor for the preliminary design and construction of the line in November 2008.

==== Line B ====
The second line of the Tours tramway will run between the end stations Papoterie and Prieuré Saint-Cosme. The main features of the line are:

- 12.5 kilometres
- 22 stations
- 37,400 passengers estimated to be transported each day
- frequency: every 7 minutes during peak hours, every 8 minutes in the off-hours
- 40 minutes to cover the entire line (average speed: 19 km/h).
- 4 park and ride facilities with a total of 900 parking spots.

Starting from the Papoterie district in Chambray-lès-Tours, Line B will serve Trousseau Hospital, Grandmont Park, and the Bergeonnerie and Fontaines districts within Quartier Montjoyeux. After turning onto Avenue de Grammont, the line will enter the Tours city center, sharing a common section with Line A between the "Verdun" and "Liberté" stations, where the existing Charcot station will serve both lines A and B. The tram will then travel along Boulevard Jean Royer and through the Casernes district as well as the Plessis-Botanique Eco-district, passing CHRU Bretonneau Hospital before turning onto the western section of Rue de la Mairie in front of the La Riche town hall and continuing to Route de Saint-Genouph. Both termini will be located near the ring road to encourage intermodality.

==== Station architecture ====
The twenty-nine stations of tram line A are designed on an identical plan, with the platforms in the two directions facing each other. They will be 4 m wide and 43 m long (52 m with the access ramps). There will be 2 double shelters per quay (16 m long).

Four stations have the platforms shared with the buses (Marne, Liberté, Joué Hôtel de Ville, Rotière). Five stations are "sidewalk" stations (Christ Roi, Porte de Loire, Nationale, Liberté, Fac 2 Lions and L'Heure Tranquille): located in pedestrian areas, the space is flat between the station and the sidewalk. Finally, Jean-Jaurès and Charcot (avenue de Grammont) are also used by buses and have longer platforms.

The red totem and Daniel Buren's gangs can be found on all stations.

The Tranchée, Charles Barrier and Place Choiseul stations are not accessible to people with reduced mobility.

In the event of an interruption of the tramway, the Plan B bus line is set up. Operated as articulated buses, it cannot however follow and serve the exact route of line A, and consequently some tram stations cannot be served by this replacement line, or transferred to stops with different names : Monconseil is not served, Coppée is postponed to the Rotterdam stop, Porte de Loire is postponed to Constantine, Nationale is not served, Tours station, Palais des Sports and St Paul are not served because the line passes avenue de Grammont, République is postponed to the La Grange and Rabière and Bulle d'O stops are postponed to the Coubertin judgment.

=== Vehicles ===
Line A uses 21 Alstom Citadis 402 trams that are 43 m long and 2,400 mm wide, and have capacity for 280 passengers. There is no catenary over the 1.8 km of track between Place Choiseul and Gare de Tours. For this section, the Alstom trams will use Alstom APS, a type of ground-level power supply.

Line B will use 19 seven-section CAF Urbos trams that are 43.7 m long and 2,400 mm wide, and have capacity for 280 passengers, 76 seated. APS is not available for CAF trams, and thus they will use battery power for the section without overhead catenary. In order to better accommodate wheelchairs, baby carriages and bicycles, the CAF trams will have 12 fewer seats than the Alstom trams.

== Criticism ==
From July 2010, a protest took shape. It is made up of collectives and associations, including an association close to the municipal opposition (TCSP 37).

Following the signing of the DUP by the prefect in December 2010, the TCSP37 association appealed against it to the administrative court of Orléans. The court rejected the request for summary suspension on 13 May 2011, and the appeal on the merits in June 2012.

At the same time, cycling associations have warned about the lack of reduction in car traffic and the inadequacies of bicycle traffic around the tramway; on Avenue Maginot, a petition opposed, among other things, the principle of a mixed lane (tram and vehicles) in the north-south direction.

In April 2011, the protest over the trees grew in the Sanitas district with the complaints of many Touraine residents about the felling of trees in the 600 m long mall. Several activists climbed to the branches in protest.

In September 2011, François Louault, a retired geography teacher, filed an appeal with the administrative court of Orléans, asking for the suspension of the construction work on a bridge over the Cher in the municipality of Tours. The summary suspension was rejected at the end of October, and the appeal itself in June 2012.

== Costs and funding ==
=== Line A ===
Initially estimated at between 270 and 290 million euros during the preliminary studies of 2007, the cost estimate was set in 2009 at more than 369 million euros excluding tax (2009 value) (in particular because of the extension of the line over an additional 2.5 km to the north for nearly 45 million euros (between the Belfry and the Vaucanson high school). At the beginning of 2013, the budget was revised upwards to exceed 400 million euros excluding tax (2013 value), to finally settle at 433 million euros at the end of the project. The investments related to this project are mainly financed by borrowing (construction sites, studies, etc.).

The Urban Community of Tours subsidised the project for 50 million, the department of Indre-et-Loire, 14.60 million, the Centre region, 12 million, the State 12 million under the State-Region Plan Contract, to which are added 33 million under the Grenelle I and Grenelle II. The subsidy obtained under the Grenelle II made it possible to build an additional 2.5 km of the line to the north, and to position the maintenance centre at this terminus.

The repayment of the loans will be ensured by the SITCAT, in particular by means of the mobility payment paid by employers with more than 9 employees, the rate of which was increased to 1.8% in January 2009 and to 2% on 1 January 2013.

Two years later, on 21 December 2015, a report by the Regional Court of Auditors indicated new figures: the cost per kilometre was 29.42 million. The total cost of the project is 638,427,333 euros (including 202,986,357 in financial charges). The overrun of the initial budget is 72.6 million euros, or 19.7%, much higher than in Brest (2.7%) and Besançon (12.2%). The debt rose from €12.5 million in 2010 to €302.17 million in 2013. It also states that "By integrating the SITCAT, Tour(s) Plus' outstanding debt has been multiplied by 3.6 and has increased from 116.6 to 420.8 million euros between 2013 and 2014". The Court of Auditors considers that, concerning additional tram lines, the finances of Tour(s) Plus "are not able to support such investments".

=== Line B ===
As of September 2023, the estimated cost to build Line B and a BRT was €495 million (excluding taxes) of which €462 million is for tram line B and a maintenance center and €33 million for the BRT. The project is financed by the Syndicat des Mobilités de Touraine through €66.6 million in loans and subsidies including €40 million from the French government, €20 million from the State-Region Planning Contract and the 2021-2026 Regional Territorial Solidarity Contract, and €6.6 million from other sources.

== Project stakeholders ==
The SITCAT (Syndicat Intercommunal de Transport en Commun) has mandated Cité Tram as the delegated project manager for this project.

=== SITCAT, the organising authority ===
Main article: Urban transport organising authority

The tramway, part of the Fil bleu network, is defined and financed by an organising authority, the Syndicat intercommunal des transports en commun de l'agglomération touraine (SITCAT).

Despite the creation of agglomeration communities, whose "transport competence" is mandatory and which are therefore de facto organising authorities, the maintenance of a Transport Union has been made necessary insofar as the urban transport perimeter (PTU) is wider than the urban community of Tours, Tour(s) Plus.

=== Cité Tram ===
Cité Tram, the delegated project owner appointed by Sitcat in November 2008, CitéTram is a consortium made up of the Société d'équipement de la touraine (SET), a semi-public company created in 1957, and the company Transamo, a subsidiary of the operator Transdev (90%) and the Brussels Intercommunal Transport Company (STIB, at 10%). Cité Tram, led by Jean-Luc Paroissien, a Transamo engineer who has already worked on the Orléans and Le Mans tramways, is responsible for coordinating the project, managing it, monitoring the studies and administrative procedures, land acquisitions, site planning, operational communication of the site and compliance with the budget. It will assume a year of follow-up, under the guarantee of perfect completion.

Cité Tram works in partnership with many companies in various professions. Work began in July 2010.

=== The project managers ===
The main project manager is a consortium led by SYSTRA, which also includes SAFEGE and Eccta for infrastructure, Xelis for equipment and systems, as well as architecture and urban development firms Richez Associés and Ivars & Ballet.

Other project managers are responsible for more specific aspects:

- RCP Design Global for the definition of the identity of the line and the design of the rolling stock;
- Ingérop and States for the bridge over the Cher;
- The L'Heudé and L'Heudé-Iosis Centre-Ouest consortium, for the maintenance centre;
- Boille et Associés, Vouquette, L'Atelier du paysage and AstecQuant for the development of the Place de la Tranchée.

== Key dates ==
Here is the provisional schedule for the line:

2010

- From 15 June to 30 July: public inquiry with a view to obtaining the declaration of public utility.
- July: start of work to reroute the networks.
- 9 September: designation of the rolling stock manufacturer (Alstom).
- 21 December: declaration of public utility.

2011

- January: release of the right-of-way with demolition, removal of furniture, etc.
- February: start of construction of the bridge over the Cher and the maintenance centre
- April: start of platform work and felling of trees in the Sanitas district.
- May: presentation of the full-scale model (the engine and the first module) of a train at the 2011 Tours Fair.

2012

- 27 April: end of work on the bridge over the Cher.
- June: end of work on the bridge on the ring road.
- August: Completion of the construction of the maintenance center.
- 5 September: delivery of the first train and is unveiled to the public.
- 12 November: start of testing of rolling stock and systems.

2013

- February: completion of the transport system works, announcement of the inauguration date.
- 29 April: Commissioning of the APS.
- July: Completion of rolling stock and systems testing.
- August: trains run without passengers in real conditions.
- 31 August: commissioning of the first tram line.
- October: the implementation of the tramway was followed by the introduction of paid parking in the city centre.

2018

- A public consultation for Line B was held in June 2018.

2021

- In July, SYSTRA was chosen to build Line B.

2024

- A public utility inquiry for Line B was held in September and October 2024.

2025

- In July, construction started on Line B.
- In November, the Syndicat des Mobilités de Touraine announced an order of 19 CAF Urbos trams for Line B.
