= Bouchet =

Bouchet may refer to:

== People ==
- André du Bouchet (1924–2001), 20th century French poet
- Barbara Bouchet (born 1943), American actress
- Christian Bouchet (born 1955), French journalist and politician
- Christophe Bouchet (born 1962), French journalist
- Christophe Bouchut (born 1966), French race car driver whose name is sometimes spelled Christophe Bouchet
- Claire Bouchet (born 1954), French politician
- Edward Bouchet (1852–1918), American physicist
- Gilbert Bouchet (1947–2025), French politician
- Paule du Bouchet (born 1951), French writer and novelist, daughter of André du Bouchet
- Philippe Bouchet (born 1953), French zoologist
- Sylvie Bouchet Bellecourt (born 1957), French politician

== Places ==
- Bouchet lake, in Haute-Loire, France
- Bouchet, Drôme, a commune in the Drôme department, in southeastern France

== Wine ==
- Alternative name for Cabernet Sauvignon in the Gironde region of France
- Alternative name for Cabernet Franc in the St-Emilion and Pomerol region of France
