= Pape Diouf =

Franco-Senegalese journalist (1951–2020)

- Born: 18 December 1951; Abéché, Chad
- Died: 31 March 2020 (aged 68); Dakar, Senegal
- Education: Sciences Po Aix
- Occupation: President of the Marseille (2005–2009)

Mababa Diouf, known as Papa Diouf or Pape Diouf (18 December 1951 - 31 March 2020) was a football journalist, agent, and later president of Olympique de Marseille from 2005 to 2009.

A descendant of a Senegalese military family, Pape Diouf arrived in France at the age of 18. After studying political science, he worked, during the 1970's and 1980's, as a sports journalist, maintaining a football column in newspaper La Marseillaise, which focused on Marseille sports life, including Olympique de Marseille. In the late 1980s, he joined the daily Le Sport, which was supposed to compete with L'Équipe, but ultimately failed.

Connected with various individuals in the football world, he then became a football agent for several players in the 1990's until 2004. That year, he joined the Olympique de Marseille club as general manager and later became the chairman of the executive board. He was appointed president in 2005, being the first and only black president of a French professional club to this day. He remained in this post for four years, before being ousted in 2009 following internal disagreements. Although the club did not win any trophies under his presidency, they remained in the top five of the French Championship standings and regained stability despite a difficult financial period. He later took part in the creation of a journalism school in Marseille and in conferences on football, switching between France and Senegal. He died in Dakar at the age of 68, victim of the COVID-19 pandemic.

== Biography ==
=== Early life ===
Pape Diouf was born in Abéché in Chad, then still a French colony, where his military father, Demba Diouf, of Senegalese origin, standard bearer of the Free French and Gaullist Forces during World War II, was responsible for the garage of the French army in Fort-Lamy (today N'Djamena). His mother's name was Aminata, the second wife of his polygamous father and he came from a family of eight children. His first name Mababa was in tribute to his grandfather, who in diminutive becomes Papa or Pape.

When he was six months old, his parents returned to Senegal, the country of his ethnically Serer and Muslim family. He lived with his uncle Jean Paul, by African tradition, in Richard Toll (the sugar bastion of Senegal), then in Mauritania, where he completed his schooling from 6 to 10 years. Diouf then returned to Dakar for his entry into elementary school. He spent two years at the Saint-Michel then enrolled in the Sacré-Cœur middle school, both belonging to the same Catholic school group. At the age of 17, his father decided to send him to Marseille at the end of his second year to take his baccalaureate.

=== Sport journalist ===
Pape Diouf arrived in Marseille at the age of 18, with a paternal injunction to become a soldier like his father, but Pape did not want to, and chose to pursue his own interests and career. At the same time as his studies at the Institute of Political Studies in Aix-en-Provence, he began working in the French administration of postal services and telecommunications (PTT), and eventually abandoned his studies. One of his colleagues at PTT was Tony Salvatori, several times champion of France and international spearfishing, who helped him become a freelance writer for the newspaper La Marseillaise. Shortly after, he was hired full time, with his main focus becoming the coverage of news regarding Olympique de Marseille. Twelve years after entering the newspaper, he joined the national sports daily Le Sport, launched in September 1987 by Xavier Couture, with the intent of competing with L'Équipe. However, on 29 June 1988, after 249 issues, Le Sport ceased its daily publications and closed (temporarily) due to lack of readers, prompting Diouf to pursue a different direction in his career.

=== Football agent ===
Subsequent to this setback, Pape Diouf organized jubilees (homage tournaments) for players in Africa, including Roger Milla, Eusébio and Boubacar Sarr. Those sparked the idea of becoming an agent for players. His first players under contract were Basile Boli and Joseph-Antoine Bell, both playing at Olympique de Marseille at the time. Later, his clients would include Marcel Desailly, Jean-Michel Ferri, Grégory Coupet, Sylvain Armand, Laurent Robert, Roger Boli, Abedi Pelé, David Sommeil, Marc-Vivien Foé, Frédéric Kanouté, Noureddine Naybet, Didier Drogba, William Gallas and Samir Nasri (since the age of 13).

=== Club manager ===
In 2004, Pape Diouf joined Marseille as general manager in charge of sports affairs. After the departure of Christophe Bouchet in the fall of 2004, he was appointed chairman of the management board of Marseille by the club's supervisory board, forming a triumvirate with Vivian Corzani and Philippe Meurice, in charge of the administrative and financial aspects of the club, respectively. In 2005, he became president of Marseille under the influence of the majority shareholder, Robert Louis-Dreyfus.

In 2006, he was at the origin of a controversial decision to field an Marseille B-team against rivals Paris Saint-Germain on the 30th (out of 38) round of the Ligue 1 championship. Prior to the game, PSG had allocated OM away fans only half the usual number of tickets, selling the other half to their own fans, meaning proximity between the two groups of fans at the Parc des Princes, which raised security concerns. As a boycott to denounce the non-compliance by the PSG security services with security standards concerning the reception of Marseille supporters, Diouf ordered then OM manager Jean Fernandez to play a reserve team. This decision incurred wrath of the French public, the Professional Football League and the exclusive broadcaster of the championship, Canal+, but it also allowed him to form a "sacred union" with the Olympian supporters. The match ended with an unexpected 0-0 draw. It is widely remembered as the "Match des Minots", meaning "Match of Kids" in French, due to the young age of most of the OM starters.

During his tenure as president, Marseille experienced a consistent progress in the French hierarchy (fifth in 2005-2006, then second in 2006-2007, third in 2007-2008, and second in 2008–2009), qualifying very regularly for the Champions League. He also reached the final of the Coupe de France twice in a row - losing in 2006 against Paris Saint-Germain and in 2007 against Sochaux.

He holds the distinction of being the only black leader of a club playing in the first division throughout Europe. In a 2008 interview, he commented on the observation, stating: “I am the only black president of a club in Europe. It is a painful observation, like European and, above all, French society, which excludes ethnic minorities.”

Due to repeated absences from the Marseille supervisory board as well as conflicts with the president of this board, Vincent Labrune, Robert Louis-Dreyfus decided to separate from Pape Diouf on 17 June 2009 after more than four years of presidency.

He is generally considered one of the major players in the renewal of Marseille at the end of the 2000s, having brought back and then maintained the club for three years in the Champions League.

He was indicted in 2016 for abuse of corporate assets and criminal association in a case related to the transfers of certain players. His indictment was quashed and he was placed under the status of assisted witness in 2018.

=== After OM ===
From 2010 on, Pape Diouf became shareholder of the European Communication School and the European Institute of Journalism in Marseille, alongside Jean-Pierre Foucault. In an interview in April 2011, he declared that he did not particularly reject the world of football despite his dismissal from Olympique de Marseille, and added that football was no more corrupt than the world of politics, health or cinema. In 2012, he was named Knight of the Legion of Honour by president François Hollande. The badges were presented to him by the President on 9 October 2013, during a collective ceremony.

At the end of 2013, he was approached to lead a list during the 2014 municipal elections in Marseille. Courted by the PS and EELV, he finally took the head of the “Changer la Donne” (meaning "Be a Game Changer" or "Make a Difference") list made up of members of the Sursaut, a collective comprising environmental dissidents and associations, and personalities from civil society. In this context, he directed a cli in which he expressed his ideas and his dissatisfaction with the political and social situation in Marseille. Its list ended in 5th position with 5.63% of the votes.

=== Sports betting ambassador ===
From 2011, following the opening of the online betting market in France, Pape Diouf also worked alongside Bernard Laporte and Claude Droussent for L'Officiel des Paris en ligne (OPL) as an expert on sports betting for football, with a regular sports column on the sport and predictions on the matches.

== Death ==
After contracting COVID-19, Pape Diouf was hospitalized in Dakar, Senegal, at the Fann Hospital, specializing in infectious and tropical diseases and placed on respiratory assistance. His condition deteriorated, preventing his planned transfer by medical plane to Nice. He died on the evening of 31 March 2020, at the age of 68. He was buried the next day in the Muslim cemetery of Yoff.

== Titles ==
- Knight of the Legion of Honour, 13 July 2012.

== Works ==
- De but en blanc, Éditions Hachette Littératures, (2009).
- C'est bien plus qu'un jeu, Éditions Grasset, (2013).
