= Serge Babary =

French politician

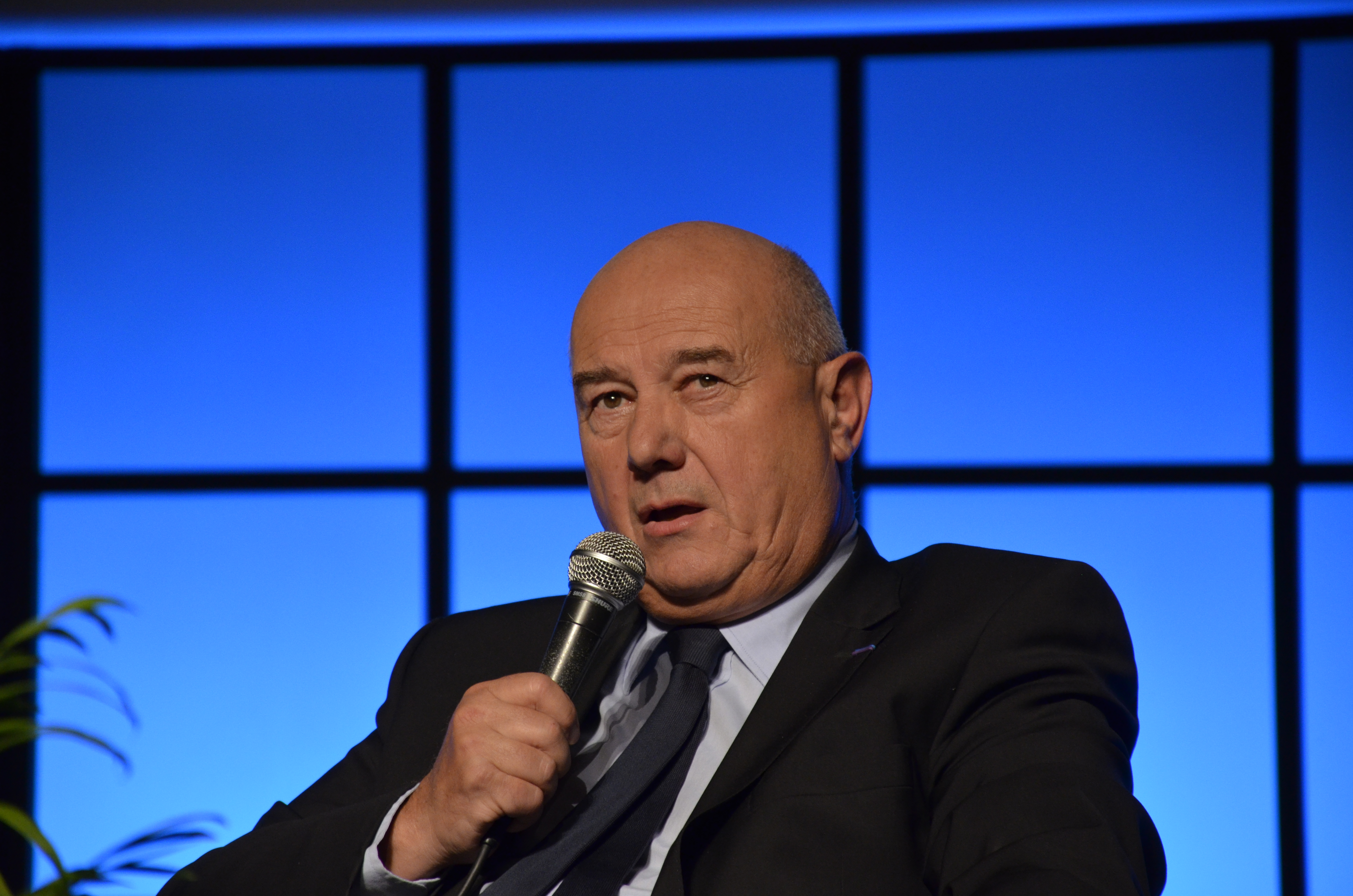

Member of the French Senate for Indre-et-Loire
- Incumbent
- Assumed office 1 October 2017

Mayor of Tours
- In office 5 April 2014 – 4 October 2017
- Preceded by: Jean Germain
- Succeeded by: Christophe Bouchet

Personal details
- Born: 16 July 1946 (age 79) Tours, France
- Party: The Republicans

Serge Babary (born 16 July 1946) is a French politician. He is a member of the French Senate representing Indre-et-Loire. He was also mayor of Tours between 2014 and 2017.
