= Jean Royer =

French politician (1920–2011)

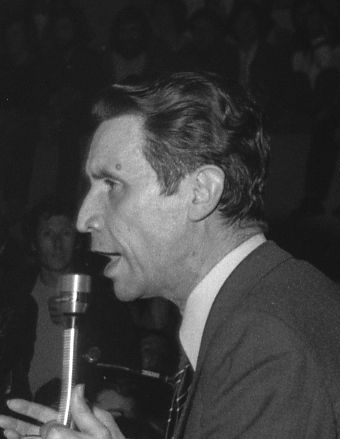

Mayor of Tours
- In office 1959–1995
- Preceded by: Marcel Tribut
- Succeeded by: Jean Germain

Personal details
- Born: 31 October 1920 Nevers, France
- Died: 25 March 2011 (aged 90) Chambray-lès-Tours, France
- Party: RPR

Jean Royer (31 October 1920 – 25 March 2011) was a French Catholic conservative politician who was a minister and mayor of Tours.

== Biography ==
=== Mayor of Tours ===
Born in Nevers, Nièvre, Royer was at first a teacher. In 1958 he was elected as a right-wing deputy from the Indre-et-Loire department, representing the city of Tours. While he was close to the Gaullist Union for the New Republic, he did not join a parliamentary group. In 1959, he was elected as the city mayor with the support of Charles de Gaulle.

In the 1960s he led an expansion of the city by annexing the cities of Sainte-Radegonde-en-Touraine and de Saint-Symphorien in order to increase the surface area available for more constructions. His main accomplishment was the construction, in an area of four kilometres along the river Cher, of housing and parks. This area included an artificial lake. He sparked controversy by supporting the construction of the A10 along Tours.

Described within his own party as an autocrat, Royer led a staunch policy vis-a-vis of social evolutions in the 1960s and 1970s. He outlawed pornographic films and brothels. In 1968 he expelled from the city Michel-Georges Micberth, who had founded a psychological and pathological research center.

=== 1974 candidacy ===
In 1973 he entered the Pierre Messmer government, leaving his seat vacant but stayed on as Mayor of Tours. During his tenure as Minister of Commerce, he in December 1973 wrote the Royer Law, which regulated the construction of supermarkets that were more than 1000 m^{2}. In early 1974, he briefly served as Minister of the PTT. On 11 April, he resigned from the government to be a candidate in the 1974 presidential election.

He stood as the candidate of moral order and polled up to 7%. However, his candidacy became a fiasco. He multiplied gaffes: he resigned from the government, unlike Valéry Giscard d'Estaing; he installed his headquarters in Tours, not in Paris; and he refused to take the plane during the campaign. His meetings were also a fiasco. For example, in Toulouse, the majority of his listeners were young students who laughed at him and yelled obscene sexual slogans. A young woman even went to the extent of undressing in front of the camera.

He won 810,540 votes, or 3.17%. Most of his votes came from Indre-et-Loire, where he broke 30%.

=== Later life ===
After the presidential fiasco, Royer returned to Tours and won his old seat back in a by-election in 1976. His term as mayor became difficult in the wake of the economic crises. In the 1980s the city was hit by economic stagnation and many factories in the suburbs closed down, such as SKF in 1989. He was, however, credited with the extension of the TGV line to Tours and the construction of a congress center. Following his re-election in the 1993 election, he joined the parliamentary group République et liberté (composed of the Left Radical Party, the MDC, and other independents). He also served as leader of République et liberté.

In the 1995 local elections, he was defeated in his bid for re-election in a three-way race with the PS and RPR. The PS Jean Germain was elected.

In the 2002 presidential election he supported the candidacy of Jean-Pierre Chevènement, before retiring from politics. In 2004 and 2007 he was hospitalized for "serious" health issues. In October 2013 a statue of Royer was erected in Place de la Liberte, Tours. The cost of 44,000 Euros being raised by public subscription.

== Bibliography ==
- Michel Jouet et Jean-Jacques Martin, Jean Royer, un réformisme autoritaire, Éditions sociales, 1975.
- Christian Garbar, Jean Royer 1974: objectif Élysée, Blois, Le clairmirouère du temps, 1981.
