= Jean Germain (politician) =

French politician

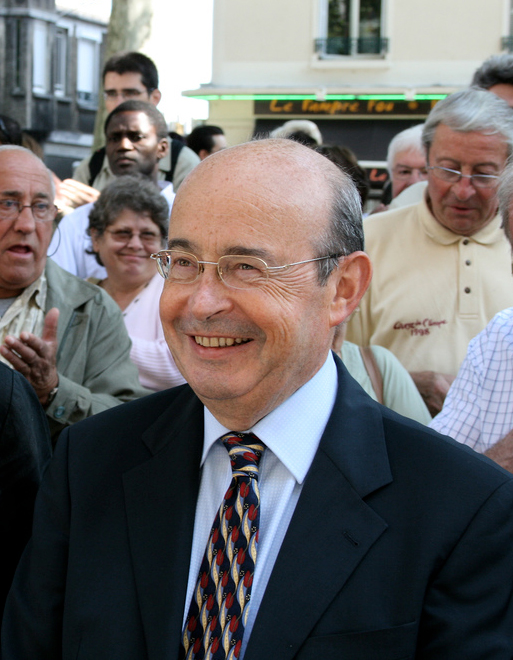
- Jean Germain in 2007

Mayor of Tours
- In office 1995–2014
- Preceded by: Jean Royer
- Succeeded by: Serge Babary

Member of the French Senate for Indre-et-Loire
- In office 2011–2015
- Succeeded by: Stéphanie Riocreux

Personal details
- Born: 11 September 1947 Tours, France
- Died: 7 April 2015 (aged 67) Tours, France
- Cause of death: Suicide
- Party: Socialist Party
- Education: François Rabelais University
- Profession: Jurist

Jean Germain (11 September 1947 – 7 April 2015) was a French socialist politician.

== Biography ==
Germain was the president of University of Tours from 1988 to 1993. In 1995, he was elected mayor of Tours and president of the agglomeration community of Tours, Tour(s) Plus.

In September 2011, Germain was elected as a Senator from the department of Indre-et-Loire.

Germain was a member of the French Socialist Party.

On 7 April 2015 he was found dead in his garage near his home in Tours, on the day that he was due to go on trial, accused of having illegally profited from Chinese bridal tours between 2007 and 2011. He left two suicide notes, protesting his innocence.
