= Christophe Bouchet =

French journalist, businessman and politician

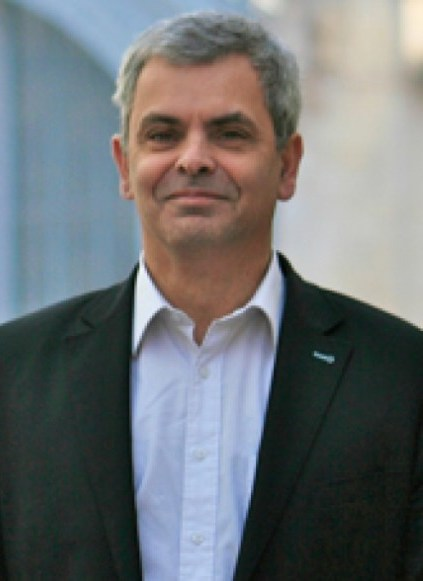
- Christophe Bouchet in 2012

Mayor of Tours
- In office 17 October 2017 – 4 July 2020
- Preceded by: Serge Babary
- Succeeded by: Emmanuel Denis

Personal details
- Born: 12 November 1962 (age 63) Livry-Gargan, France
- Party: Radical Party

Christophe Bouchet (born 12 November 1962) is a French former journalist at Le Nouvel Observateur. He was the president of French football club Olympique de Marseille from spring 2002 to November 2004. Now, Christophe Bouchet is the president of Easi Marketing, a marketing company who especially works with Toulouse FC.
