= List of trolleybus systems =

This is a list of cities where trolleybuses operate, or operated in the past, as part of the public transport system. The original list has been divided to improve user-friendliness and to reduce article size. Separate lists—separate articles in Wikipedia—have been made for the following countries:

- Americas
  - Brazil
  - Canada
  - United States
- Europe (Note: countries not listed here are included in this article; see Contents table below)
  - France
  - Germany
  - Italy
  - Russia
  - Spain
  - Switzerland
  - Ukraine
  - United Kingdom

This page also provides references that are applicable to all parts of the complete list.

Bold typeface for a location city indicates an existing trolleybus system, currently in operation (temporary suspensions not counted), or a new system currently under construction.

== Africa ==
=== Algeria ===
Name of system	Location	Date (from)	Date (to)	Notes
	Algiers	1934	1974	
	Constantine	-	-	Construction started 1914, not completed.
	Constantine	1921	1963-64 (?)	
	Oran	17 May 1939	1969 (?)	

=== Egypt ===
Name of system	Location	Date (from)	Date (to)	Notes
	Cairo	1948	22 October 1981	

=== Morocco ===
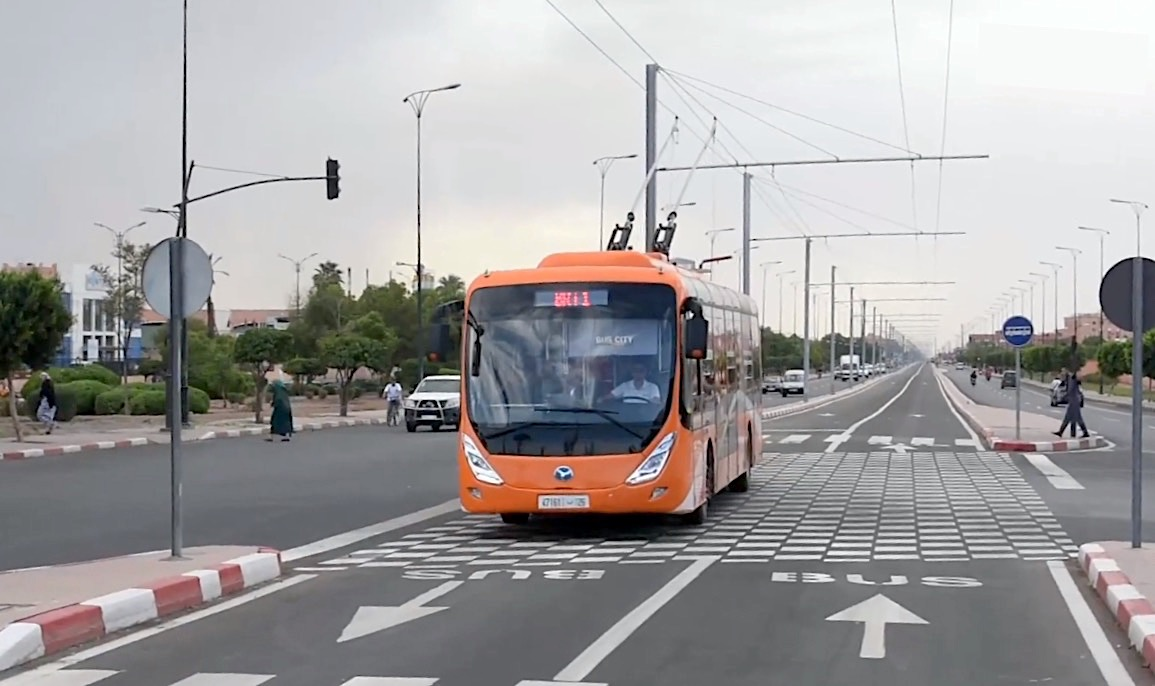
A trolleybus on the dual BRT system in Marrakesh

Name of system	Location	Date (from)	Date (to)	Notes
	Casablanca	1932	May 1972	
	Marrakesh	29 September 2017		See also: Trolleybuses in Marrakesh.
	Tétouan	Apr 1950	Nov 1975	Suburban line to Martil.

=== South Africa ===
Name of system	Location	Date (from)	Date (to)	Notes
	Bloemfontein	16 December 1915	Oct 1937	
	Boksburg	25 March 1914	10 October 1925	
	Cape Town	1930 21 December 1935	- 28 February 1964	Demonstration See also: Trolleybuses in Cape Town.
	Durban	24 February 1935	11 April 1968	See also: Trolleybuses in Durban.
	Germiston	19 August 1914	1918	
	Johannesburg	1930 26 August 1936	- 10 January 1986	Demonstration. See also: Trolleybuses in Johannesburg.
	Pretoria	1 July 1939	21 February 1972	See also: Trolleybuses in Pretoria.

=== Tunisia ===
Name of system	Location	Date (from)	Date (to)	Notes
	Tunis	5 September 1946	15 January 1970	

== Americas ==
=== Argentina ===
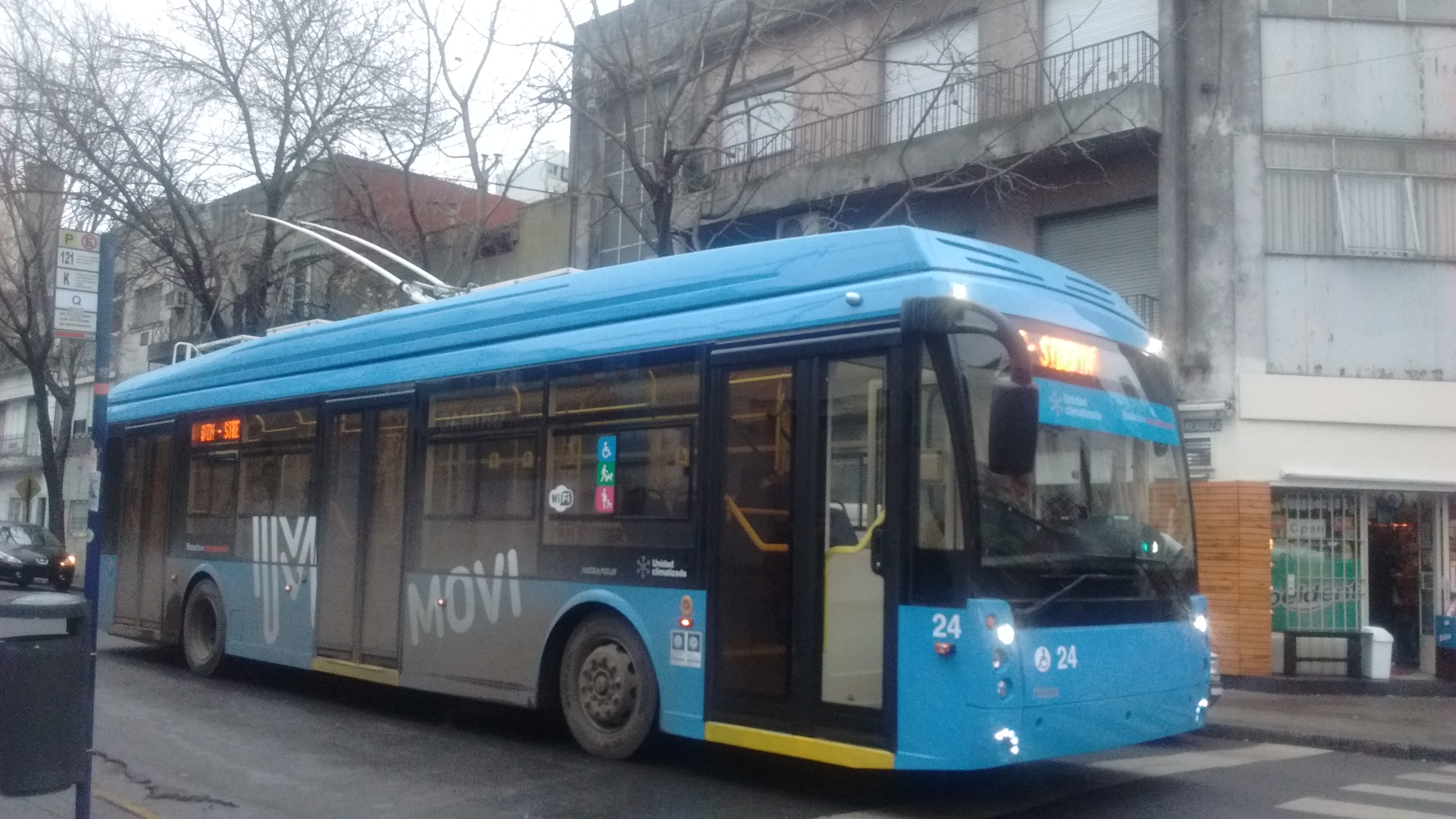
A Russian Trolza trolleybus in Rosario

Name of system	Location	Date (from)	Date (to)	Notes
	(Bahía Blanca)			Completed 1954, not opened.
TBA	Buenos Aires	4 June 1948	30 April 1966	
Emir SA, TECSA, TAMSE	Córdoba	7 May 1989		See also: Trolleybuses in Córdoba.
	La Plata	December 1954	25 December 1966	
	Mar del Plata	1956	1963 (?)	
EPTM, STM	Mendoza	16 October 1913 14 February 1958	1915 (?) February 2021	See also: Trolleybuses in Mendoza.
EMTR, DMT, M. Fierro, Ecobus, SEMTUR	Rosario	24 May 1959		Operation suspended 1 January 1993 – 25 January 1994, during transition to a new operator and fleet. See also: Trolleybuses in Rosario.
Dirección Provincial del Transporte.	Tucumán	23 July 1955	28 April 1962	Three routes, fleet of 25 Henschel coaches.

=== Chile ===
Name of system	Location	Date (from)	Date (to)	Notes
	Valparaíso	31 December 1952		Operation suspended 1 December 1981 - circa May 1982, reopened after sale to a new, private operator. See also: Trolleybuses in Valparaíso.
ENT/ETCE	Santiago	31 October 1947	ca. November 1978	Also experimental operation in 1940 with a single vehicle.
ETS	Santiago	24 December 1991	9 July 1994	Also experimental operation in 1940 with a single vehicle.

=== Colombia ===
Name of system	Location	Date (from)	Date (to)	Notes
	Bogotá	12 April 1948	15 August 1991	
	Medellín	12 October 1929	1951	An experimental trolleybus line, using one vehicle, operated on the campus of the Universidad Pontificia Bolivariana from 30 November 2011 until December 2012. A trolleybus system for Medellín is proposed (as of 2013).

=== Cuba ===
Name of system	Location	Date (from)	Date (to)	Notes
	(La Habana /Havana)	(18 September 1949)	?	Test operation, see note.

- Note: Tests began 18 September 1949 along tramway lines using "all-service vehicles" (dual-mode buses) purchased secondhand from Newark, New Jersey, US. The tests did not involve building new or converting existing supply because Havana's tramway had twin-wire overhead. Regular service was not operated.

=== Ecuador ===
Name of system	Location	Date (from)	Date (to)	Notes
	Quito	18 December 1995		See also: Trolleybuses in Quito

=== Mexico ===
Name of system	Location	Date (from)	Date (to)	Notes
SITREN	Guadalajara	15 December 1976	November 2025	Limited, free service initially; full service began on 9 January 1977. See also Trolleybuses in Guadalajara.
STE	Ciudad de México /Mexico City	9 March 1951		See note. See also: Trolleybuses in Mexico City.

- Note: The Mexico City trolleybus system was long thought to have opened in April 1952, but is now known to have opened more than a year earlier, in March 1951. Previous to that, there was an experimental line, for testing without passengers, in 1947 or 1948.

=== Peru ===
Name of system	Location	Date (from)	Date (to)	Notes
	Lima	July 1928	13 June 1931	

=== Trinidad and Tobago ===
Name of system	Location	Date (from)	Date (to)	Notes
	Port of Spain	1 October 1941	31 December 1956	

=== Uruguay ===
Name of companies	Location	Date (from)	Date (to)	Notes
AMDET (1951–1976); COOPTROL (1975–1992)	Montevideo	28 March 1951	26 January 1992	

=== Venezuela ===
Name of system	Location	Date (from)	Date (to)	Notes
Transbarca	(Barquisimeto)			Partially constructed, 2006–2012 (not continuously), and very limited demonstration service operated on one section from November 2012 to circa early 2013, but system did not open for regular service, and project was cancelled in July 2013. See also Trolleybus usage by country#Venezuela for more information.
Tranvías Eléctricos de Caracas	Caracas	July 1937	1949 (?)	
Tromerca	Mérida	18 June 2007	c. mid-2016	Introductory service, Sundays only, started 26 November 2006. System opened (regular, daily service) on 18 June 2007. Service gradually converted to diesel bus operation in 2015–16; no formal closure announcement, but trolleybus service not expected to resume. See also Trolleybuses in Mérida.
	Valencia	1941	1947 (?)	

== Asia ==
=== Afghanistan ===
Name of system	Location	Date (from)	Date (to)	Notes
	Kabul	February 1979	1993	See also: Trolleybuses in Kabul

=== Armenia ===
Name of system	Location	Date (from)	Date (to)	Notes
	Gyumri	29 November 1962	2005	
	Yerevan	15 August 1949		See also: Trolleybuses in Yerevan.

=== Azerbaijan ===
Name of system	Location	Date (from)	Date (to)	Notes
	Baku	5 December 1941	30 June 2006	See also: Trolleybuses in Baku.
	Ganja	1 May 1955	2004	See also: Trolleybuses in Ganja, Azerbaijan.
	Mingaçevir	15 April 1989	31 March 2006	See also: Trolleybuses in Mingachevir.
	Nakhchivan	3 November 1986	April 2004	See also: Trolleybuses in Nakhchivan (city).
	Sumqayıt	28 April 1961	31 December 2005	See also: Trolleybuses in Sumqayit.

=== China ===
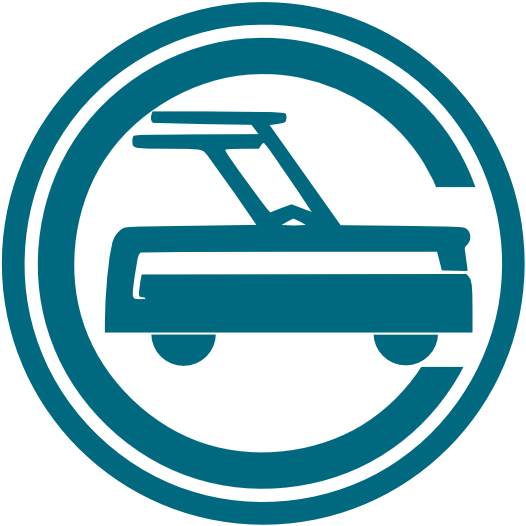
Trolleybus sign in China

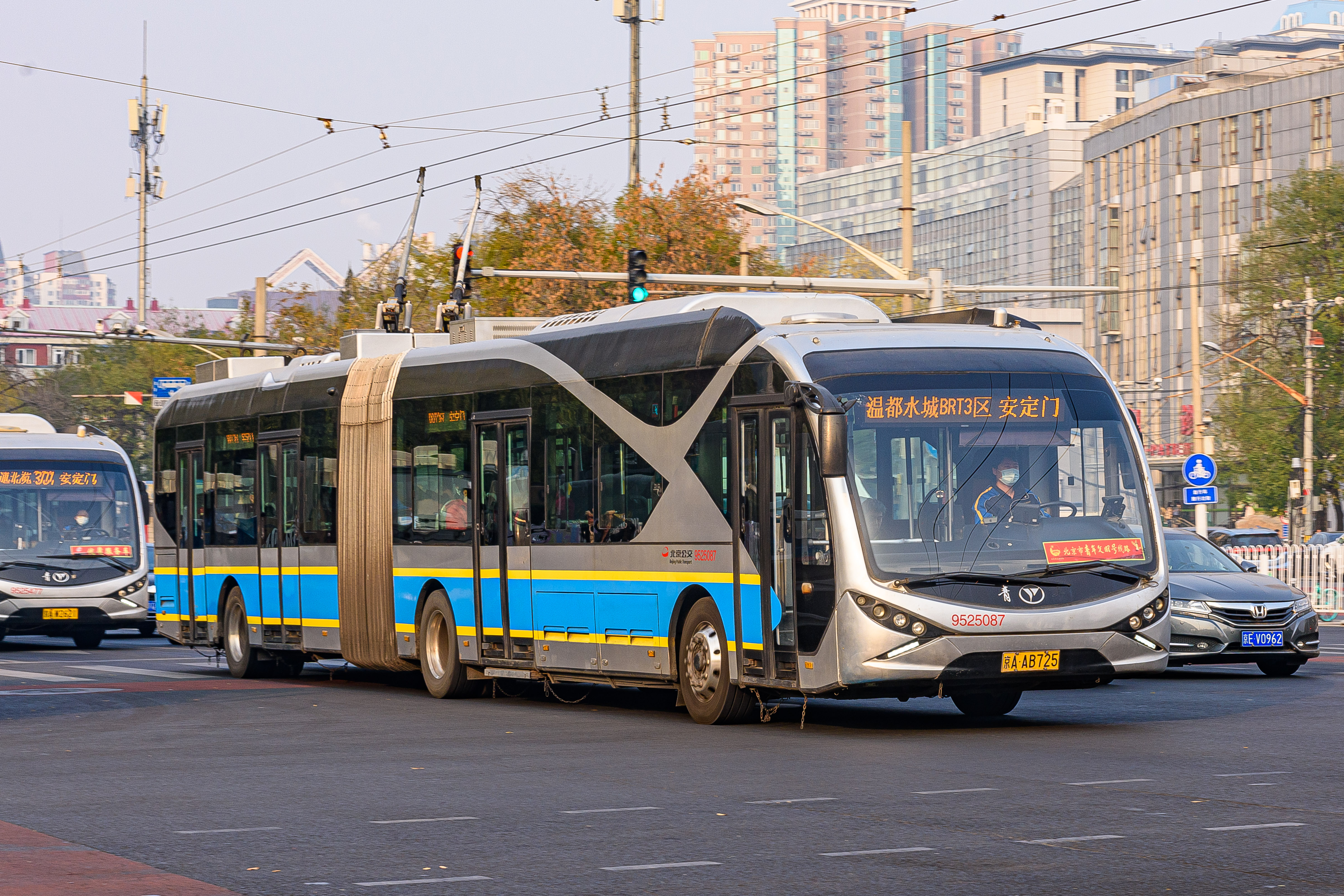
Youngman JNP6183BEV trolleybus in Beijing

Name of system	City	Province	Date (from)	Date (to)	Notes
	Anshan	Liaoning	1 January 1975	1 July 2000	
	Beijing	—	26 February 1957		See also: eBRT - Beijing BRT.
	Benxi	Liaoning	1 July 1960	1 May 1998	
	Baoding	Hebei	29 December 2018		As of 2021, trolleybuses temporarily replaced by battery-electric buses due to construction.
	Changchun	Jilin	1 July 1960	1 May 2001	
Wuyang Meikuang (五阳煤矿) Trolleybus	Changzhi	Shanxi			An independent system owned by Lu'an Environmental Energy Development Co., Ltd. serving Wuyang Coal Mine and nearby areas
	Chengdu	Sichuan	1 January 1962	10 January 1996	
	Chongqing	—	24 December 1955	23 May 2004	
	Dalian	Liaoning	1 October 1960		
	Datong	Shanxi	15 January 1985	1990s	3 km mining commuter trolleybus from Xinergou to Wajinwan Mine opened in 1985; extended June 1988 on both ends from Silaogou to Wangcun Mine for total length of 16 km.
	Fuzhou	Fujian	28 September 1983	14 March 2001	
	Guangzhou	Guangdong	30 September 1960		
	Hangzhou	Zhejiang	26 April 1961		
	Harbin	Heilongjiang	31 December 1958	26 June 2008	
	Jilin City	Jilin	1 October 1960	2000	
	Jinan	Shandong	1 January 1977		See also: Trolleybuses in Jinan.
Xiaohengshan Meikuang (小恒山煤矿) Trolleybus	Jixi	Heilongjiang		2016	An independent system owned by Jixi Mining Group Co., Ltd. serving Xiaohengshan Coal Mine and nearby areas
	Lanzhou	Gansu	1 January 1960	6 May 2008	
	Luoyang	Henan	1 October 1984	10 October 2025	
	Nanchang	Jiangxi	1 July 1971	20 June 2009	
	Nanjing	Jiangsu	1 August 1960	10 January 1996	
	Qingdao	Shandong	21 October 1960		
	Qiqihar	Heilongjiang	16 February 1959	14 March 2002	
	Shanghai	—	15 November 1914		See also: Trolleybuses in Shanghai.
	Shenyang	Liaoning	1 November 1951	20 June 1999	See also: 1998 Shenyang trolleybus electrocution accident
Yangzhuang Meikuang (杨庄煤矿) Trolleybus	Feicheng / Tai'an	Shandong			An independent system owned by Shandong Energy Feicheng Mining Group Co., Ltd. serving Yangzhuang Coal Mine and nearby areas.
	Taiyuan	Shanxi	1 May 1960		Taiyuan Public Transport Holdings, Ltd. owned system
Xishan Meidian (西山煤电) Trolleybus	Taiyuan	Shanxi		Guandi / 官地线 end at 5 May 2016	A two routes (Guandi / 官地线 and Duerping / 杜儿坪线) independent system owned by Xishan Coal Electricity Group Co., Ltd. serving the factory and nearby areas.
	Tianjin	—	1 July 1951	15 July 1995	
	Tianshui	Gansu	10 July 1958	1961	
	Wuhan	Hubei	20 September 1958		Wuhan Public Transport Group Co., Ltd.-owned system. See also Wuhan trolleybus route 1.
Wuhan Gangtie (武汉钢铁) Trolleybus	Wuhan	Hubei	1 October 1962	2006	An independent system owned by Wuhan Iron and Steel (Group) Co. serving the factory and nearby areas
	Xi'an	Shaanxi	1 October 1959	14 January 2009	
	Xi'an	Shaanxi	9 February 1983		Commuting trolleybus line for an artillery factory in Tianwang.
Chaohua Meikuang (超化煤矿) Trolleybus	Xinmi/Zhengzhou	Henan		March 2016	An independent system owned by Zhengzhou Coal Industry (Group) Co., Ltd. serving Chaohua Coal Mine and nearby areas
Niu'erzhuang Meikuang (牛儿庄煤矿) Trolleybus	Niu'erzhuang/Handan	Hebei		January 2010	An independent system owned by Jizhong Energy Group serving Niu'erzhuang Mine and nearby areas
Xingtai Meikuang (邢台煤矿) Trolleybus	Xingtai	Hebei		March 2012	An independent system owned by Jizhong Energy Group serving Xingtai Mine and nearby areas
	Zhengzhou	Henan	1 May 1979	15 January 2010	
	Zhengzhou	Henan	1 January 2021		New eBRT trolleybus introduced along BRT Route B2.
	Zibo	Shandong			Trolleytrucks in the Shandong Jinling Mine.

=== Georgia ===
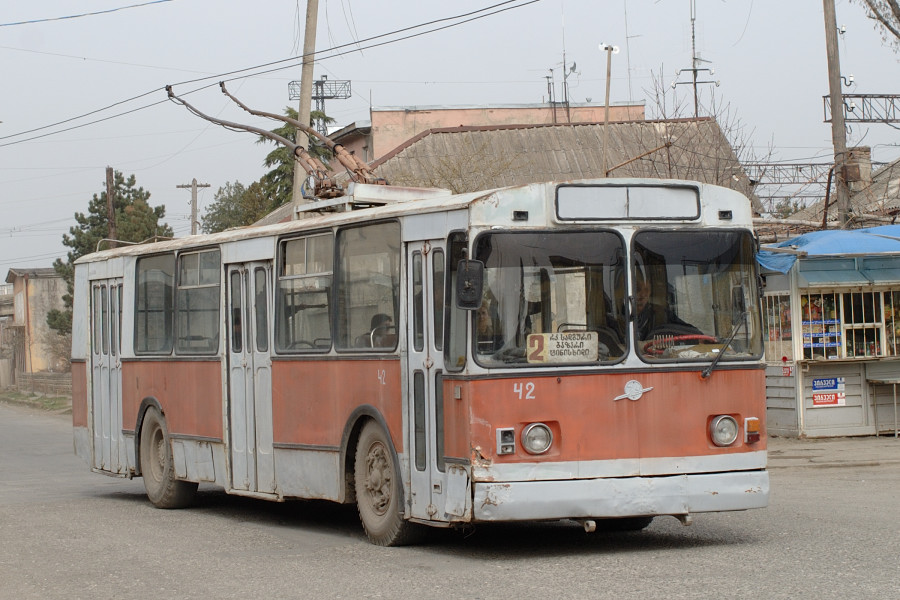
ZiU-9 trolleybus in Gori

Name of System	Location	Date (From)	Date (To)	Notes
	Batumi	6 November 1978	2005	Included two interurban lines to Makhinjauri and Khelvachauri.
	Chiatura	7 November 1967	2008	Interurban line to Sachkhere.
	Gori	30 April 1972	24 March 2010	Included interurban lines to the villages of Tiniskhidi and Ortasheni.
	Kobuleti			Construction started 1990 - 1991 of interurban line to Makhinjauri (terminus of a line from Batumi), not completed.
	Kutaisi	11 September 1949	25 July 2009	Service suspended 14 January 2007 – November 2007
	Ozurgeti	27 November 1980	June 2006	Included interurban line to Dvabzu village.
	Poti	20 January 1980	December 2004	Included interurban line to Maltakva village.
	Rustavi	16 February 1971	24 September 2009	Service suspended in 2000
	Samtredia	28 August 1982	2000?	Included interurban line to Kulashi village.
	Sukhumi	3 January 1968		Service suspended August 1992 - 1995
	Tbilisi	21 April 1937	4 December 2006	
	Tskhinvali	25 June 1982	December 1990	
	Zestaponi			Construction started 1990 - 1991, not completed.
	Zugdidi	24 February 1986	July 2009	Service suspended 1992 - 1995

=== India ===
Name of system	Location	Date (from)	Date (to)	Notes
	Delhi	1935	1962	
	Mumbai	11 June 1962	24 March 1971	

- Note: In Kolkata (Calcutta), trial operation with a single trolleybus on a short test line took place in 1977.

=== Iran ===
Name of system	Location	Date (from)	Date (to)	Notes
	Tehran	14 September 1992	2024	Service suspended from 2013 to 2016. See Trolleybuses in Tehran.

=== Japan ===
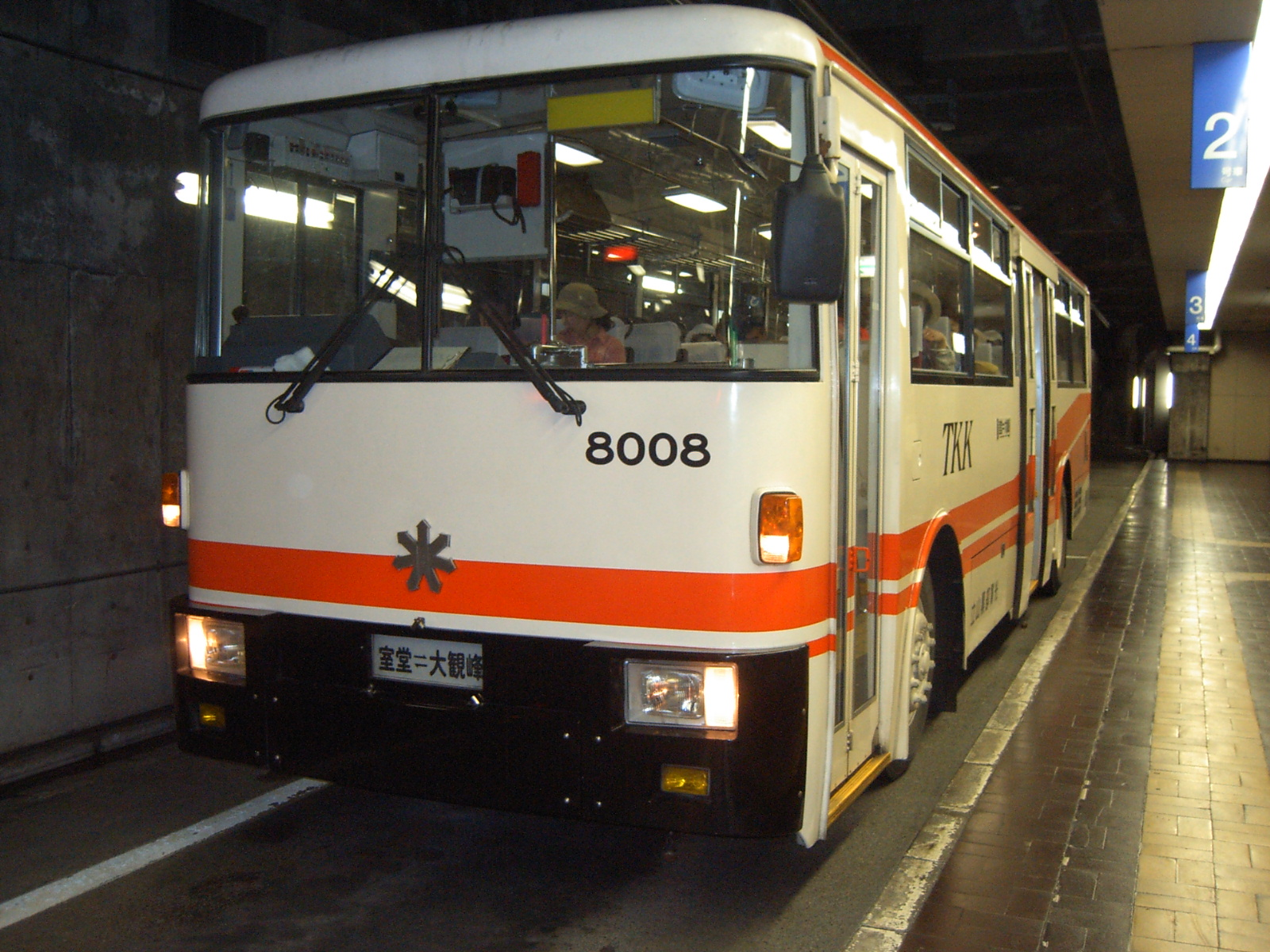
Trolleybus on tunnel line in Tateyama

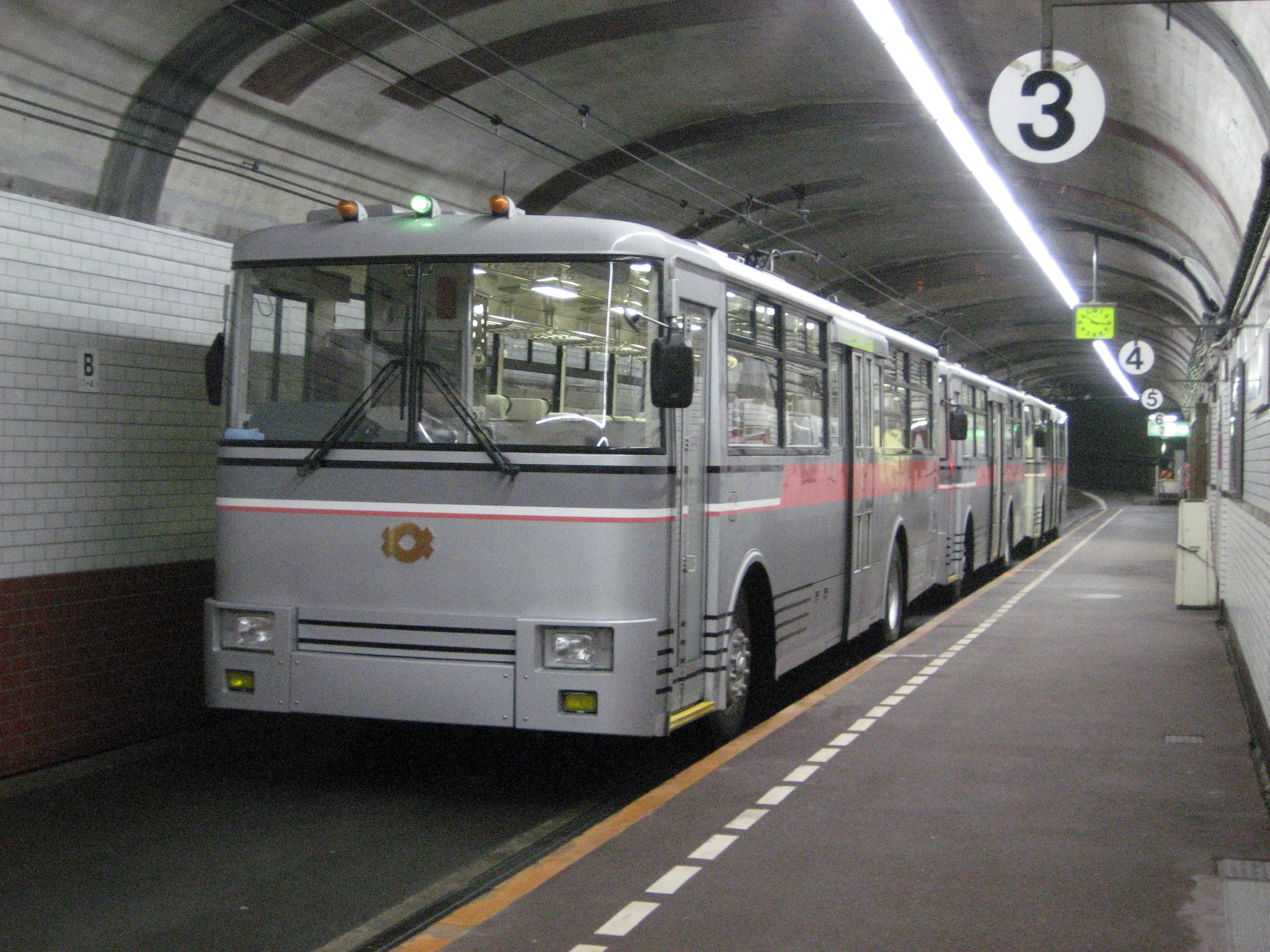
Underground trolleybus in Kurobe Dam

Name of system	Location	Date (from)	Date (to)	Notes
Shin-Hanayashiki Onsen-tochi (新花屋敷温泉土地)	Hanayashiki	1 August 1928	April 1932	Hanayashiki is part of Kawanishi, Hyogo
Kawasaki-shiei Trolleybus (川崎市営トロリーバス)	Kawasaki	1 March 1951	30 April 1964	
Kanden Tunnel Trolleybus	Ōgizawa Station – Kurobe Dam	1 August 1964	30 November 2018	Trolleybuses have been replaced with autonomous electric buses from April 2019.
Tateyama Tunnel Trolleybus	Daikanbō – Murodō	23 April 1996	30 November 2024	Trolleybuses replaced with electric buses from April 2025.
Kyōto-shiei Trolleybus (京都市営トロリーバス)	Kyoto	1 April 1932	30 September 1969	
Nagoya-shiei Trolleybus (名古屋市営トロリーバス)	Nagoya	10 May 1943	15 January 1951	
Ōsaka-shiei Trolleybus (大阪市営トロリーバス)	Osaka	1 September 1953	14 June 1970	
Toei Trolleybus (都営トロリーバス)	Tokyo	20 May 1952	28 September 1968	
Yokohama-shiei Trolleybus (横浜市営トロリーバス)	Yokohama	16 July 1959	31 March 1972	

Notes for the two tunnel trolleybus lines:

- The 6.1 km Kanden Tunnel Trolleybus line operated almost entirely in tunnel, through a mountain, and connected Ōgizawa Station with Kurobe Dam, for tourists and hikers. The transport service continues to operate, but no longer uses trolleybuses. Ōgizawa Station is in Ōmachi city, Nagano Prefecture.
- The affiliated 3.6 km Tateyama Tunnel Trolleybus line, similarly, operates entirely in tunnel and connects Daikanbo with Murodō. The line is located in Tateyama town, Toyama Prefecture.

Both lines are part of the Tateyama Kurobe Alpine Route. This passes through Chūbu-Sangaku National Park (also known in English as "Japan Alps National Park").

Both lines have since been converted to electric buses and are no longer trolleybuses.

=== Kazakhstan ===
Name of system	Location	Date (from)	Date (to)	Notes
	Aqtobe	11 August 1982	July 2013	Service suspended February 4 until 12 June 2013.
	Almaty	20 April 1944		See also Trolleybus transport in Almaty
	Astana	18 January 1983	30 September 2008	
	Atyrau	4 September 1996	29 April 1999	
	Novaya Bukhtarma	1 January 1975	1980	Trolleybus to cement plant, closed because of inconvenience as line was built to terminate 900 meters away from the plant.
	Petropavl	25 December 1971	1 June 2014	Closed due to bankruptcy.
	Karaganda	30 May 1967	20 April 2010	
	Qostanay	28 December 1989	2005	Closed in 2005; contact network fully dismantled in 2011.
	Shymkent	11 January 1969	October 2005	Some operation reported during 2005, none during 2006.
	Taraz	10 April 1980	December 2013	Service suspended from the December 2013 under the pretext of water infrastructure repairs. Fully dismantled 13/3/2017.

- Note: A Russian-language source states that a system in the city of Turkistan was projected, but ultimately abandoned.

=== Kyrgyzstan ===
Name of system	Location	Date (from)	Date (to)	Notes
	(Balykchy)			Trolleybus infrastructure built along a 5.8 km long path from 1992-1994, never operated.
	Bishkek	13 January 1951	3 November 2024	
	(Jalal-Abad)			Work terminated in 1991.
	Naryn	30 October 1994	31 May 2024	The trolleybus system has been closed and dismantling of the overhead network is planned for the summer of 2025, together with the widening of the main street.
	Osh	1 November 1977		

=== Malaysia ===
Name of system	Location	Date (from)	Date (to)	Notes
	George Town	19 March 1924	31 July 1961	See also Trolleybuses in George Town, Penang.

=== Mongolia ===
Name of system	Location	Date (from)	Date (to)	Notes
	Ulaanbaatar	29 October 1987	31 December 2024	See also Trolleybuses in Ulaanbaatar

=== Myanmar ===
Name of system	Location	Date (from)	Date (to)	Notes
	Yangon	17 August 1936	by 1942	

=== Nepal ===
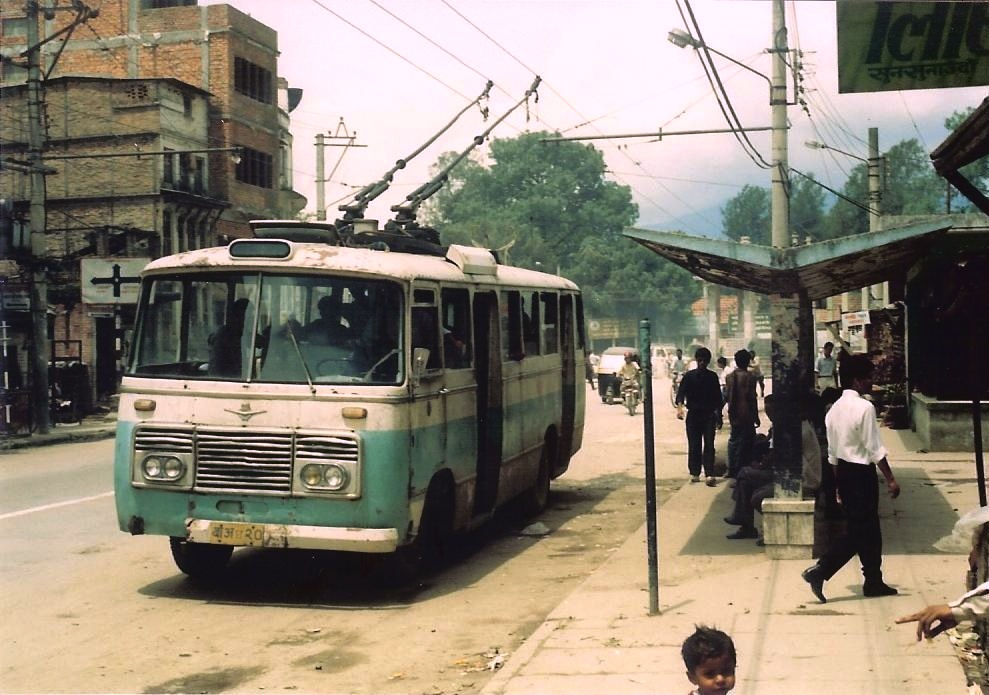
Trolleybus in Kathmandu in 1993

Name of system	Location	Date (from)	Date (to)	Notes
	Kathmandu	28 December 1975	November 2008	Service suspended 19 December 2001 – 1 September 2003. See also Trolleybuses in Kathmandu.

=== North Korea ===
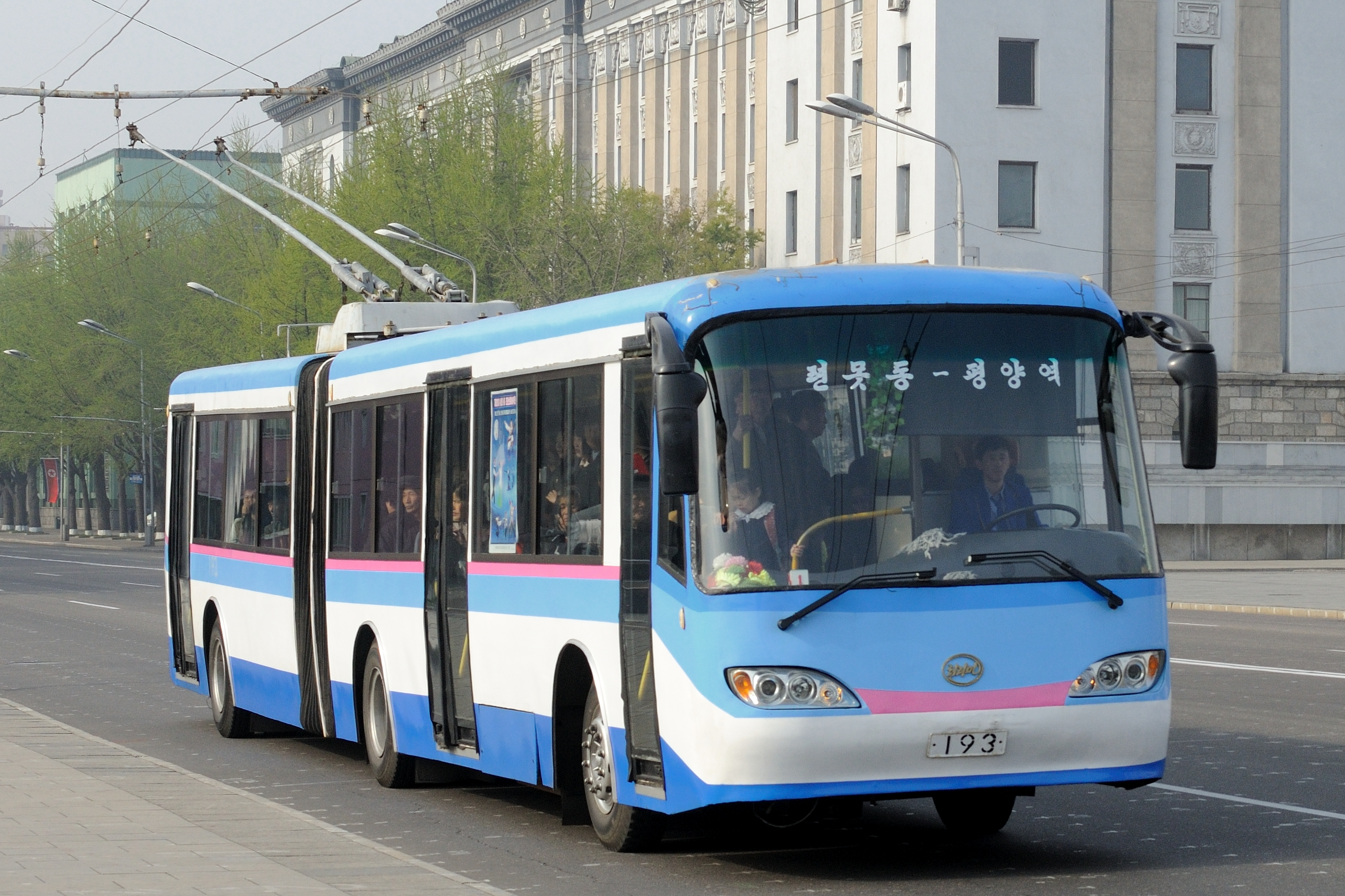
Chollima-091 trolleybus in Pyongyang

Name of system	Location	Date (from)	Date (to)	Notes
	Anju	1987 (Anju to Namhung Youth Chemical Complex) 24 August 1993 (Anju to near Sinanju Chongnyon station)	2000 (Namhung Youth Chemical Complex to Anju)	Assumed route Segment around Namhung Youth Chemical Complex is a one way, counter-clockwise loop, closed around 2000. Poles remain in parts of the route. Operated with Chollima-74 trolleybuses.
	Chongjin	20 October 1970		3 lines; trolleybus formerly duplicated part of tram route on main road, later removed.
	Hamhung	1973		Assumed routes Another branch to Ryongsung existed, for a total length of about 15 km. It was dismantled in the early 2000s.
	Huichon			7 km long line, has at least two new Chollima-321 trolleybuses.
	Hochon	1993	trolleybuses removed since 2020	Connects Sangnong-rodongjagu with Sangnong mine. Assumed route.
	♦ Sangnong Mine			Cargo trolleybus line in Sangnong mine as ore transport, replacing previous locomotive based ore transport system.
	Hongwon			Cargo trolleybus line in Rochon Quarry, Unpho Mine, replacing previous truck based ore transportation system, operated with trolleybuses converted by the mine.
	Jonchon	possible late 2000s		A line serving February 8 General Machine Factory. A trolleybus was located within the machine plant between 2011-2014. A depot was built in 2017, but its roof was destroyed in 2021, revealing two trolleybuses.
	Kanggye	17 April 1992		A single trolleybus line via a riverbank. Assumed route
	Kapsan			10-ri (3.9 km) long trolleybus line from a mining village to (presumably) Kapsan mine.
	Kimchaek	17 May 1985		Long distance line (9.1 km) from Kimchaek–Sinpyong-dong–Haksong-dong–Jangbong with the depot in Sinpyong. The line was truncated to just Kimchaek to the depot at Sinpyong-dong between 2011 and 2012, to a length of 4.4 km.
	Kujang			Commuter trolleybus in Ryongdung-rodongjagu, connecting to Ryongdung Mine. Two ex-Pyongyang Chollima-72 trolleybuses.
	Kumya			Commuter trolleybus line connecting Kaljon-rodongjagu with Kumya Youth Mine. An unbuilt second stage was to extend the trolleybus line from the edges of the worker's district to within the district itself.
	Manpo	December 2019		5 km line opened in 2019, first stage from Kunmak-dong to Pyolo-dong.
	Nampo			Trolleybus service was normalised in 2021.
	Onsong	15 January 1996	before 2004	Connects Onsong railway station to the Wangjaesan Grand Monument. Bidirectional line with only one set of overhead wires. Line is likely mothballed, no trolleybuses seen in satellite imagery.
Pyongsong Transport Company	Pyongsong	4(?) Aug 1983		One line within Pyongsong. Other line usually considered to be part of Pyongsong Assumed route
	Pyongyang	30 April 1962		See also: Trolleybuses in Pyongyang.
	♦Unjong-guyok: Paesan-dong to Kwangmyong-dong	Originally built 1990s Split between 1996-2005		The district is now part of Pyongyang, it was split off from Pyongsong's network during that period of time into its own, completely separate line.
	Sangwon	29 March 1995		5 km long trolleybus route connecting Myongdang-rodongjagu to the Sangwon Limestone Mine, via the Sangwon Cement Complex. The line was built and operated by the Sangwon Cement Complex.
	Sariwon	19 June 1999		Assumed route. Served by two Ikarus 280 converted articulated trolleybuses only. Other three vehicles stored.
	Sinhung		trolleybuses removed since 2017	A 4.1km bidirectional, one way line serving Sinhung Workers' District. The line is currently mothballed.
	Sinpyong		Likely closed since 2000s	One 2 km line serving Mannyon-rodongjagu, likely with overhead on only one side of the road.
	Sinuiju	1978 late 1980s (to Ragwon Machine Complex)	2005-2009 (Sinuiju Chongnyon station to Ragwon Machine Complex)	Operation suspended 2018 to October 2020, restarted with Chollima-321 bodied trollebuses that were likely to be rebuilds based on Chollima-82 chassis. Current line is a one way loop around city. 9km long interurban line existed from late 1980s until closed between 2005 and 2009 during reconstruction of highway. Services replaced by buses.
	Sudong	1979		As South Korea does not recognise geographical changes within North Korea, it is labeled as Kowon sometimes. It was split from Kowon County in 1990. A trolleybus is said to exist for Kowon coal mine, with an unknown state of operation. Black and white 2011 Google Earth imagery shows a plausible trolleybus loop and 800m of poles along the eastern side of a roadway that disappear under the train station due to cloud cover. No trolleybuses are visible. Received Chollima 9.25 from Pyongyang for opening.
	Sunchon			Articulated trolleybus production started in 1990, with plans to also supply trolleybuses to Anju, Pyongsong, Sunchon and Tokchon.
	Tanchon	1986	No trolleybuses visible after 2011, loop near Kumgol station demolished before 2015.	A line in Kumgol Youth station to Kumgol-3-dong for miners and residents serving the Komdok mine. 6.2 km long. 3 trolleybus seen near Kumgol station in 2011. Probably closed due to 2012 North Korean floods.
	Tanchon			Trolleybus was to be built in the Sindanchon (new Tanchon) district.
	Tokchon	27 April 1990	around 2014	Trolleybus movements were no longer observed after 2014. Prior to that, satellite imagery captured trolleybus movement in the city.
	Unhung	1980s		4 new trolleybuses delivered for operation of commuter trolleybus connecting miners' town to Unhung Mine.
	Unsan	1980s		Commuter trolleybus in Kubong-rodongjagu connecting to Ryongdae Mine, with a length of 10-ri (3.9 km).
	Wonsan	8 September 1988		A single line via city's main thoroughfare. Assumed route. Received new Chollima-321 trolleybuses.

=== Philippines ===
Name of system	Location	Date (from)	Date (to)	Notes
	Manila	Feb 1929	Dec 1941	

=== Saudi Arabia ===
Name of system	Location	Date (from)	Date (to)	Notes
	Riyadh	23 April 2013		System in the campus of the King Saud bin Abdulaziz University for Health Sciences.

=== Singapore ===
Name of system	Location	Date (from)	Date (to)	Notes
	Singapore	14 August 1926	15 December 1962	See also: Trolleybuses in Singapore.

=== Sri Lanka ===
Name of system	Location	Date (from)	Date (to)	Notes
	Colombo	22 July 1953	1 December 1964	

=== Tajikistan ===
Name of system	Location	Date (from)	Date (to)	Notes
	Dushanbe	2 May 1955		See also: Trolleybuses in Dushanbe.
	Khujand	3 November 1970	September 2010	Service suspended 15 May 2008 – 17 August 2009. Since ~2006, service extremely unstable due to power outages. Officially service closed in April 2013.

=== Turkey ===
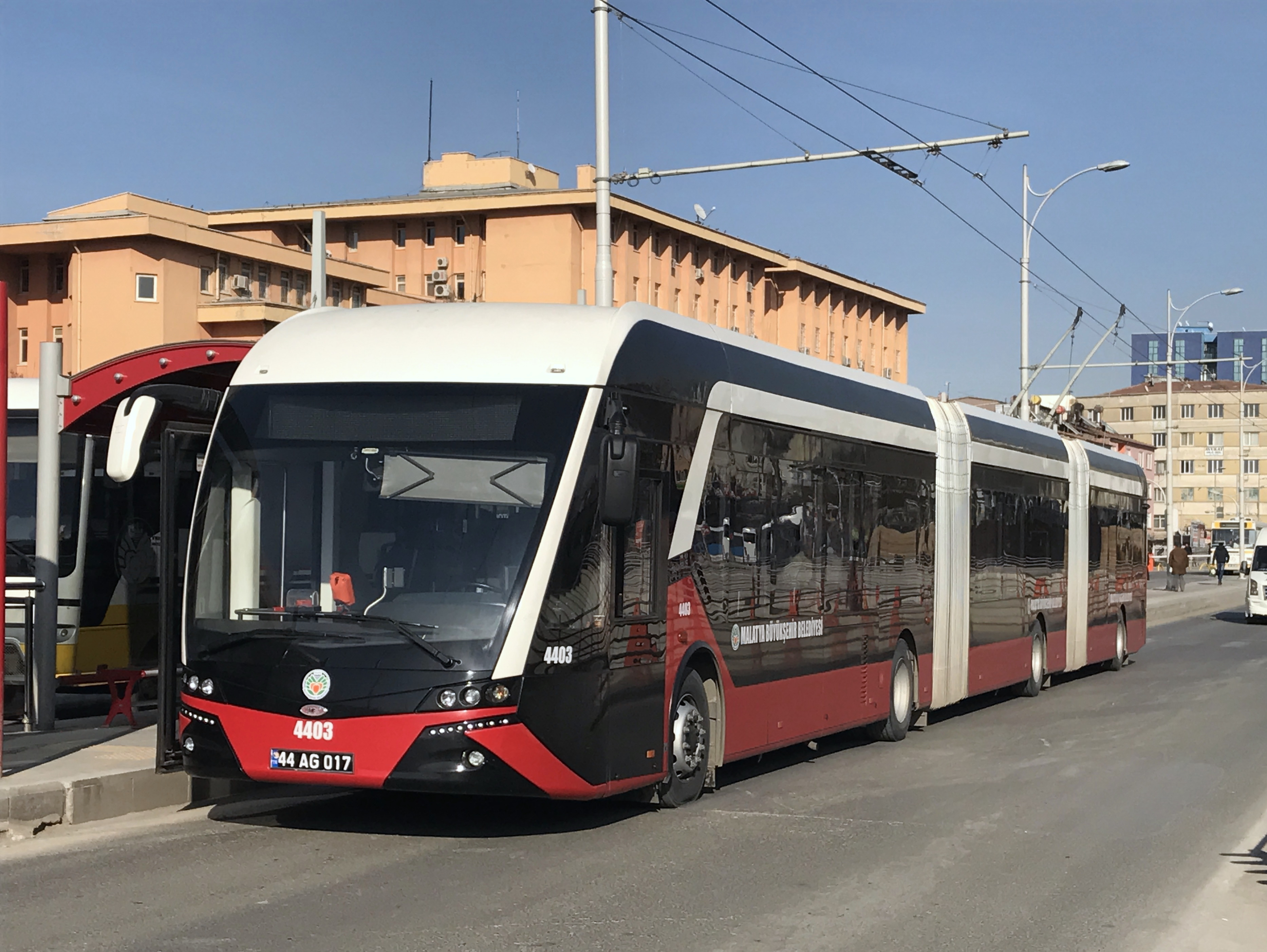
The trolleybus system of Malatya opened in 2015, and uses vehicles that were mostly Turkish-built.

Name of system	Location	Date (from)	Date (to)	Notes
	Ankara	1946	1981	
İstanbul Elektrik Tramvay ve Tünel İşletmeleri Genel Müdürlüğü	Istanbul	1962	16 July 1984	Trolleybuses operated only on European side. See Trolleybuses in Istanbul.
	İzmir	July 1954	Sep 1992	See also: Trolleybuses in Izmir.
Trambüs	Malatya	10 March 2015		
Trambüs	Sanliurfa	28 April 2023		

=== Turkmenistan ===
Name of system	Location	Date (from)	Date (to)	Notes
	Ashgabat	19 October 1964	31 December 2011	See also: Trolleybuses in Ashgabat.

=== Uzbekistan ===
Name of system	Location	Date (from)	Date (to)	Notes
	Andijan	30 April 1970	March 2002	
	Bukhara	1 December 1987	September 2005	
	♦ Bukhara - Kagan			Reported as complete but not yet open (Trolleybus Magazine).
	Jizzakh	26 August 1997	3 January 2010	
	Ferghana	23 February 1971	July 2003	Service suspended 1999 - March 2002.
	♦ Ferghana- Margilan	1971	1999?	
	Qorako‘l			A single line under construction since 1995. Project abandoned in 1997.
	Namangan	4 April 1973	3 January 2010	In service ~2001? - 2010 only interurban line (see below)
	♦ Namangan-Turakurgan	~2001?	3 January 2010	Construction started in 1996
	Nukus	14 December 1991	July 2007	
	Olmaliq	20 December 1967	February 2009	Service closed after a serious accident at a electricity substation. In the last few years of operation, the condition of vehicles deteriorated and work cars were used on routes.
	Samarkand	20 December 1957	2005	
	Tashkent	7 November 1947	30 April 2010	
	♦ Urgench- Khiva	20 October 1997		See also: Trolleybuses in Urgench.

- Note: A Russian-language source "Электротранспорт в городах бывшего СССР". states that systems were under construction in the following locations:
- Angren
- Chirchiq
- Guliston
- Qarshi
- Kokand
- Navoiy
- Termez
- Yangiabad

=== Vietnam ===
Name of system	Location	Date (from)	Date (to)	Notes
	Hanoi	15 December 1986	15 July 1993	Trolleybuses replaced previously liquidated tram network; a total of 19 trolleybuses were built on the chassis of various trucks. Throughout its operation, the condition of the system was poor, with vehicles running at 5 to 10 km/h.

== Europe ==
=== Austria ===
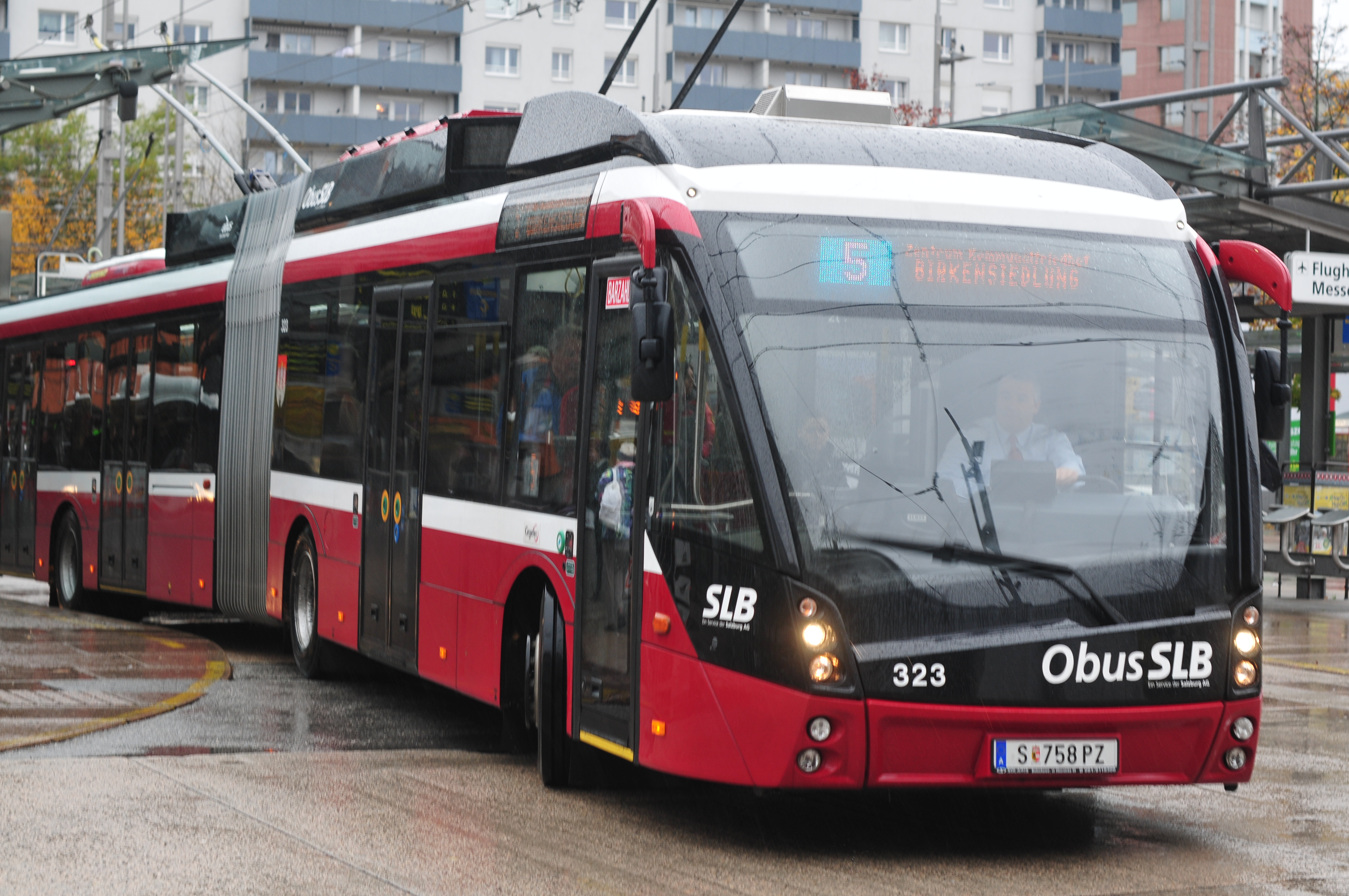
Solaris Trollino 18 in Salzburg

Name of system	Location	Date (from)	Date (to)	Notes
Elektrischer Oberleitungs-Automobil-Verkehr der Stadt Gmünd / Trolejbusová doprava v Gmündu	Gmünd	12 July 1907	14 July 1916	See also: Elektrischer Oberleitungs-Automobil-Verkehr der Stadt Gmünd (in German); city divided after World War I; see České Velenice Czech Republic.
	Graz	1 October 1941	29 June 1967	
	Innsbruck	8 April 1944	29 February 1976	
	Innsbruck	17 December 1988	25 February 2007	See also Trolleybuses in Innsbruck.
	Judenburg	10 December 1910	1914	See also: Gleislose Bahn Judenburg (in German).
Mürztaler Verkehrs-Gesellschaft	Kapfenberg	1 July 1944	31 March 2002	System included line extending to Bruck an der Mur; see also Oberleitungsbus Kapfenberg (in German).
	Klagenfurt	1 August 1944	16 April 1963	
Elektrischer Oberleitungs-Automobil-Betrieb der Gemeinde Weidling	Klosterneuburg	22 May 1908	Dec 1919	See also: Elektrischer Oberleitungs-Automobil-Betrieb der Gemeinde Weidling (in German), connected Klosterneuburg and Weidling railway station.
	Leoben	1 March 1949	13 July 1973	See also: Oberleitungsbus Leoben (in German).
	Liesing	17 July 1909	8 January 1920	See also: Elektrische Oberleitungsbahn Liesing–Kalksburg (in German), connected Liesing and Kalksburg, today part of Vienna.
	Linz	15 May 1944		See also: Trolleybuses in Linz.
	Salzburg	1 October 1940		See also: Trolleybuses in Salzburg.
	Vienna			
Gleislose Bahn Pötzleinsdorf–Salmannsdorf	♦ Pötzleinsdorf - Salmannsdorf	14 October 1908	30 October 1938	See also Gleislose Bahn Pötzleinsdorf–Salmannsdorf (in German).
	♦ Währinger Gürtel - Salmannsdorf	9 October 1946	2 December 1958	See also Oberleitungsbus Wien (in German).

Goods (freight) line (trolleytruck):

Name of system	Location	Date (from)	Date (to)	Notes
	Sankt Lambrecht	16 November 1945	21 April 1951	Limited passenger service operated .

=== Belarus ===
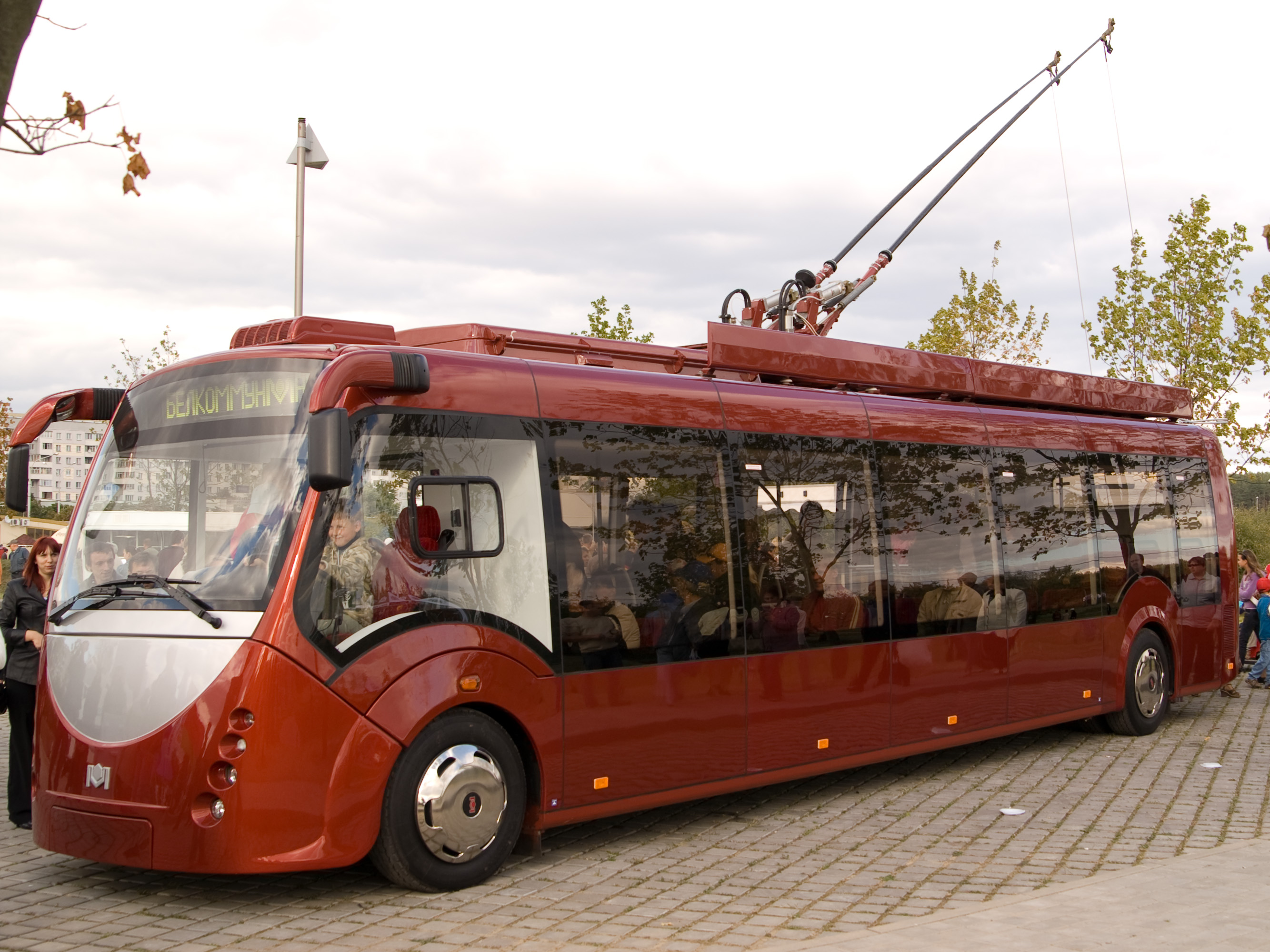
AKSM-420 Vitovt in Minsk

Name of system	Location	Date (from)	Date (to)	Notes
	Babruysk	30 August 1978		
	Brest	20 April 1981		See also: Trolleybuses in Brest, Belarus.
	Homiel	20 May 1962		
	Hrodna	5 November 1974		
	Kosino	1950s		A cargo trolleybus system in the 'Pobeda' collective farm, Lahoysk.
	Mahilyow	19 January 1970		
	Minsk	19 September 1952		The second largest network in world (after Moscow); see also Trolleybuses in Minsk
	Snov	1950s	1960s	A cargo trolleybus system in the Kolkhoz named after Mikhail Kalinin.
	Vitebsk	1 September 1978		

- Note: Plans were announced in 2001 for new systems in:

Baranovichi

Barysaw

Lida

Molodechno

Novopolotsk

Orsha

Pinsk

Polotsk

Soligorsk

(Trolleybus Magazine)

=== Belgium (by province) ===
==== Antwerp (Antwerpen) ====
Name of System	Location	Date (From)	Date (To)	Notes
	Antwerp	14 August 1929	31 March 1964	

==== Brussels ====
Name of system	Location	Date (from)	Date (to)	Notes
	Brussels	18 April 1939	15 February 1964	

- Note: The Brussels-Capital Region is not a province. Neither does it belong to one, nor does it contain any.

==== East Flanders (Oost-Vlaanderen) ====
Name of System	Location	Date (From)	Date (To)	Notes
	Ghent	24 March 1989	14 June 2009	Operation suspended 9 April 2004 – 17 October 2005.

==== Liège ====
Name of system	Location	Date (from)	Date (to)	Notes
	Liège	31 July 1930	9 November 1971	
RELSE	♦ Liège - Seraing	15 May 1936	31 August 1964	This system operated a unique group of double-ended trolleybuses with driving positions at both ends.

=== Bosnia-Herzegovina ===
Name of system	Location	Date (from)	Date (to)	Notes
GRAS Sarajevo	Sarajevo	23 November 1984		Operation suspended April 1992 - 27 November 1995 because of war, after war network was renewed and trolleybuses still drive in Sarajevo.

=== Bulgaria ===
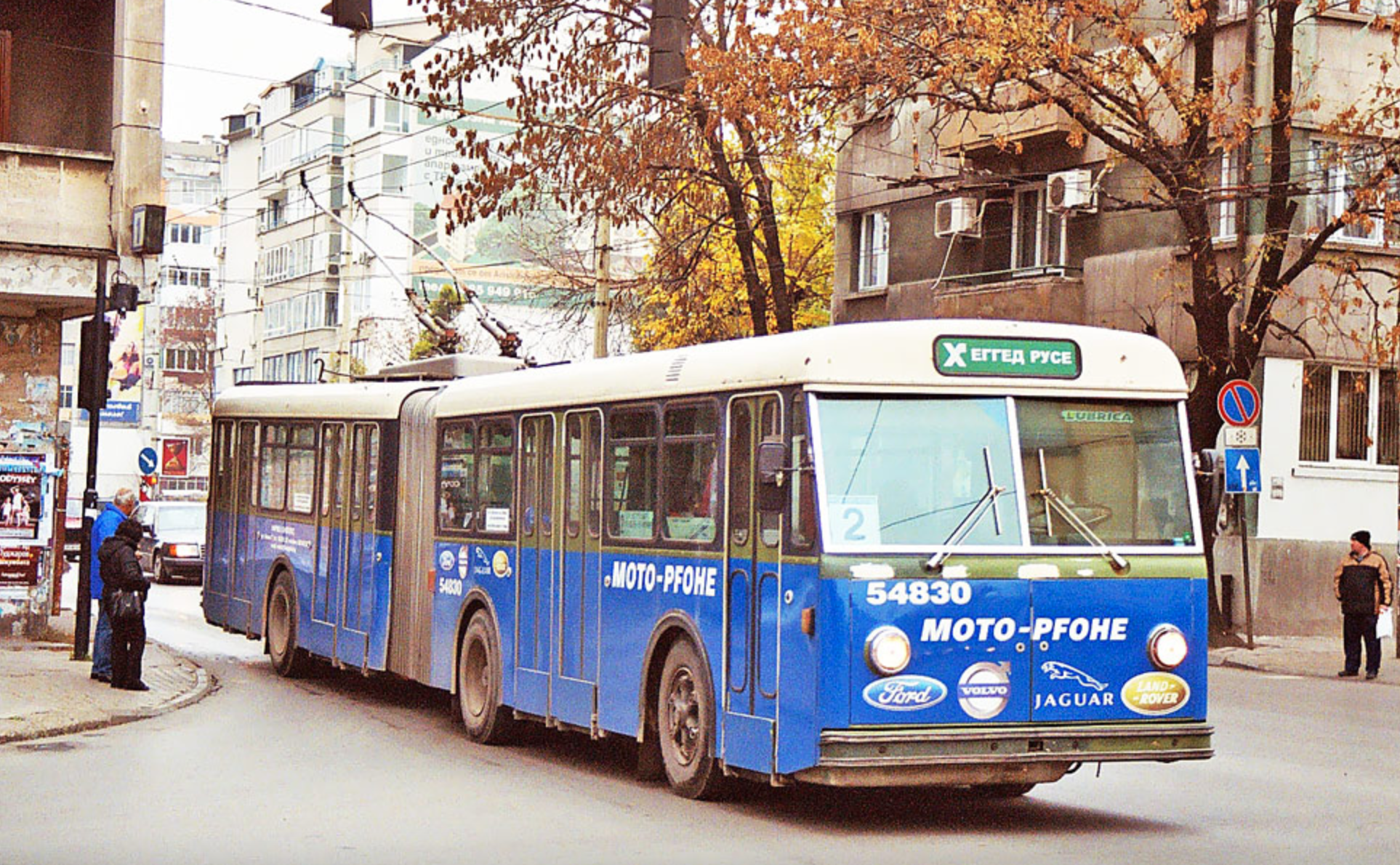
Ex-Bern trolleybus in Ruse

Location	Date (from)	Date (to)	Notes
Blagoevgrad			Construction started during the late 1980s, not completed.
Burgas	25 September 1989		See also Trolleybuses in Burgas.
Gabrovo	17 April 1987	24 March 2013	
Gorna Oryahovitsa			Construction started during the late 1980s, partially completed but never in service. The line was supposed to connect the towns of Gorna Oryahovitsa and Lyaskovets with planned connection to the system in Veliko Tarnovo.
Dimitrovgrad			Construction started during the late 1980s, partially completed but never in service.
Dobrich	9 September 1987	30 June 2014	
Haskovo	1990		
Kazanlak	1 May 1986	10 January 1999	
Pazardzhik	1 June 1993		
Pernik	20 September 1987	30 March 2015	
Pleven	7 October 1985		
Plovdiv	6 January 1956	October 2012	See also Trolleybuses in Plovdiv.
Ruse	9 September 1988		See also Trolleybuses in Ruse.
Shumen			Construction started during the late 1980s, partially completed but never in service.
Sliven	24 May 1986		
Sofia	8 February 1941 1 May 1948	9 September 1944 -	See also Trolleybuses in Sofia.
Stara Zagora	November 1987		See also Trolleybuses in Stara Zagora.
Varna	1 January 1986		See also Trolleybuses in Varna.
Veliko Tarnovo	1991	31 March 2009	See also Trolleybuses in Veliko Tarnovo.
Vidin			Construction started during the late 1980s, partially completed but never in service.
Vratsa	1988		
Yambol			Construction started during the late 1980s, not completed.

=== Croatia ===
Name of system	Location	Date (from)	Date (to)	Notes
	Rijeka	27 October 1951	16 August 1969	
	Split	1964	1968	

=== Czech Republic ===
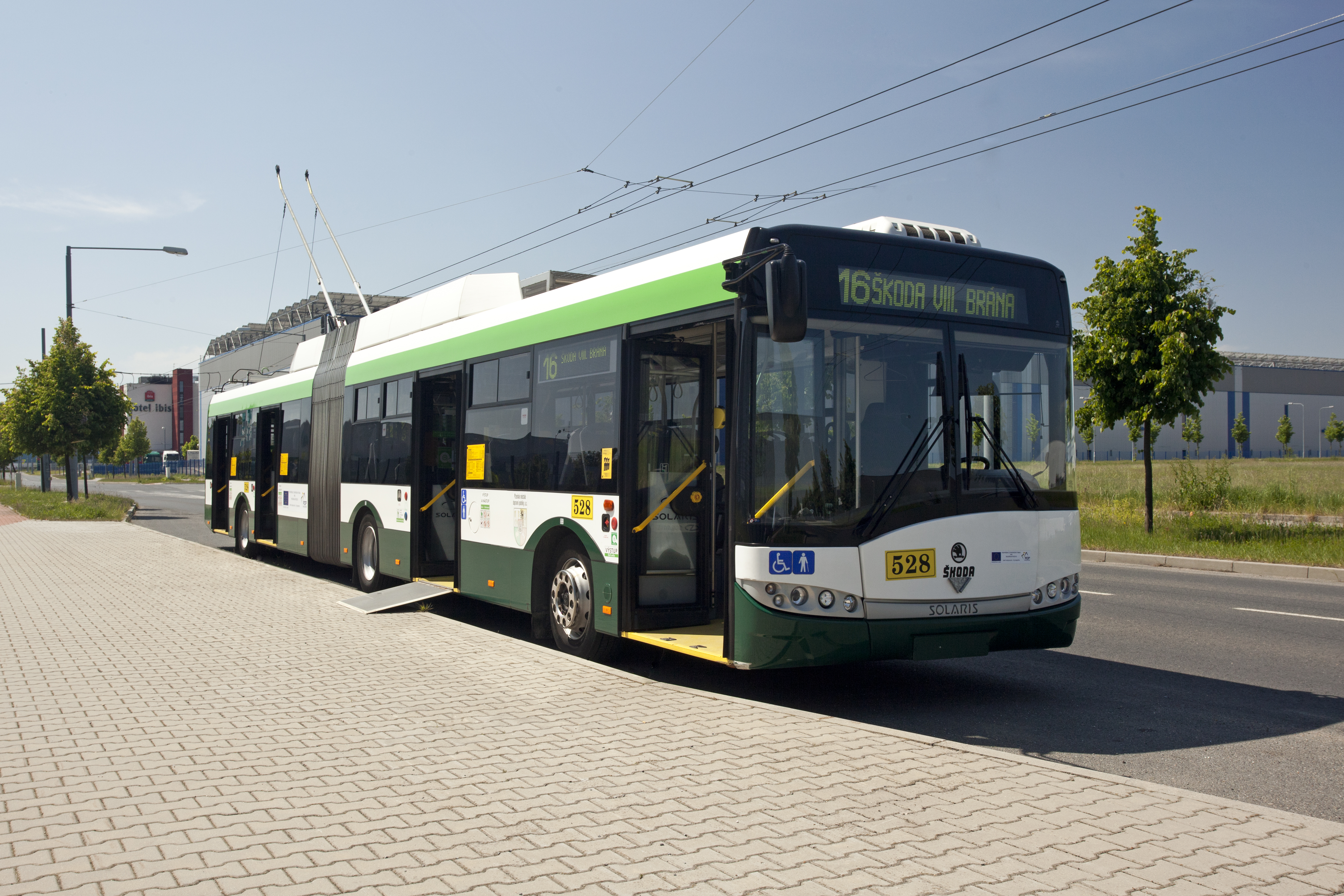
Škoda 27Tr Solaris trolleybus in Plzeň

Name of system	Location	Date (from)	Date (to)	Notes
	Brno	30 July 1949		
until 1914: Gleislose Bahn Budweis, modern system: Dopravní podnik města České Budějovice (trolejbusová síť)	České Budějovice	1909	1914	First of three systems. For the first system, see also Gleislose Bahn Budweis (in German), the German name for the first system, because České Budějovice was part of Austria-Hungary until 1918.
until 1914: Gleislose Bahn Budweis, modern system: Dopravní podnik města České Budějovice (trolejbusová síť)	České Budějovice	28 October 1948	24 April 1971	
until 1914: Gleislose Bahn Budweis, modern system: Dopravní podnik města České Budějovice (trolejbusová síť)	České Budějovice	2 May 1991		
Trolejbusová doprava v Gmündu / Elektrischer Oberleitungs-Automobil-Verkehr der Stadt Gmünd	České Velenice	16 July 1907	14 July 1916	See also Trolejbusová doprava v Gmündu (in Czech)
	Chomutov–Jirkov	1 September 1995		
	Děčín	6 January 1950	14 December 1973	
	Hradec Králové	2 May 1949		
	Jihlava	19 December 1948		
	Mariánské Lázně	27 April 1952		See also Trolleybuses in Mariánské Lázně.
	Most and Most–Litvínov	1948	31 January 1959	
	♦ Litvínov	6 December 1946	31 January 1959	
	Opava	24 August 1952		
	Ostrava	9 May 1952		
	Pardubice	20 January 1952		
	Plzeň	9 April 1941		
	Prague	29 August 1936	15 October 1972	See also Trolleybuses in Prague.
	Prague	15 October 2017		See also Trolleybuses in Prague.
	Teplice	1 May 1952		
	Ústí nad Labem	1 July 1988		
	Zlín–Otrokovice	27 January 1944		

=== Denmark ===
Name of system	Location	Date (from)	Date (to)	Notes
KS	København /Copenhagen	21 May 1938 2 August 1993 (dual-mode)	15 October 1963 Oct 1998	Also 1902 demonstration.
NESA	♦ Hellerup, København	1 February 1927	17 October 1971	
OS	Odense	8 August 1939	19 November 1959	

=== Estonia ===
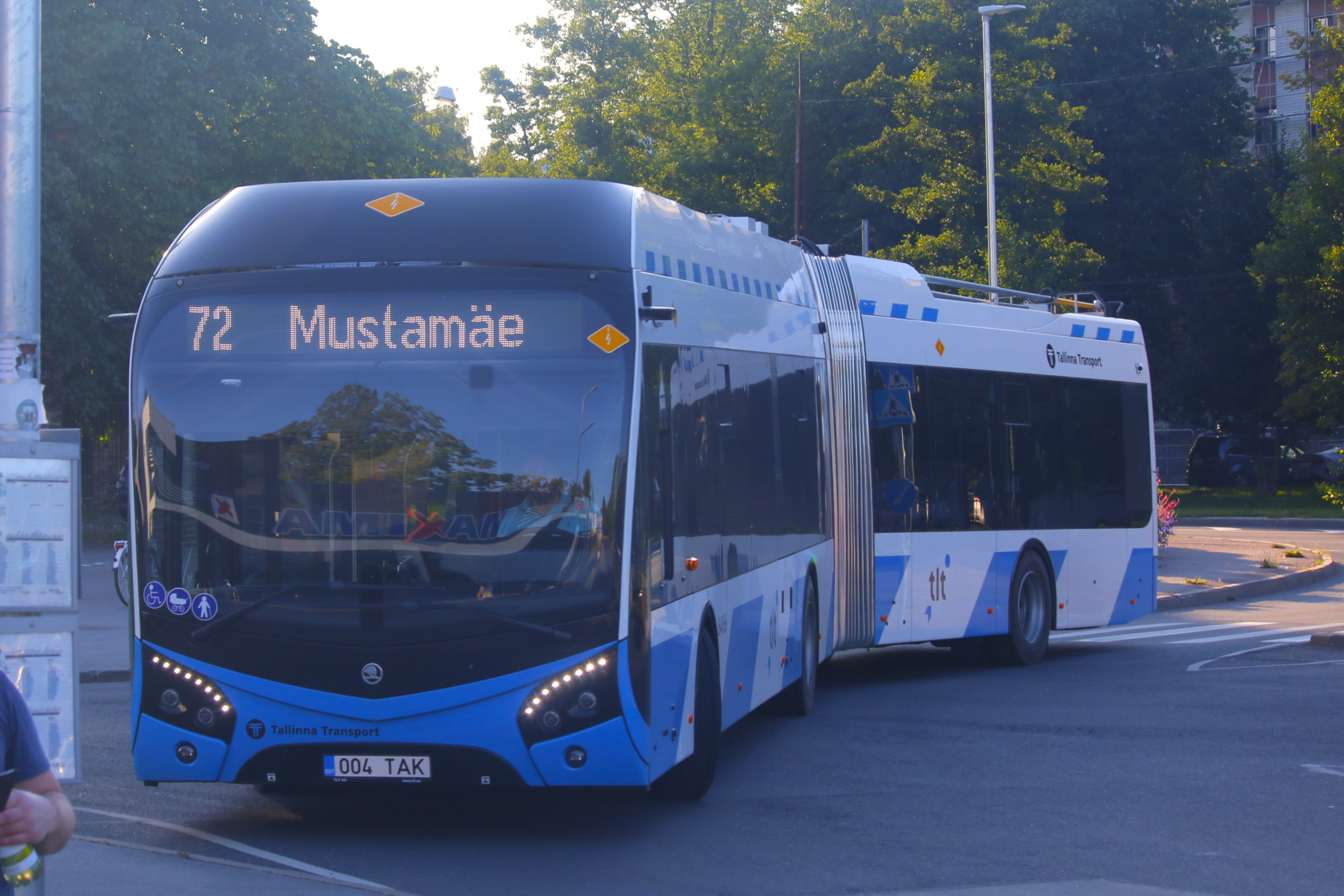
Škoda 33Tr SOR in Tallinn

Name of system	Location	Date (from)	Date (to)	Notes
Tallinna Linnatranspordi AS (TLT)	Tallinn	6 July 1965		All service temporarily suspended since 1 November 2024; planned to resume with new vehicles in 2026.
	Tartu	1936	1936	Demonstration/test line.

=== Finland ===
Name of system	Location	Date (from)	Date (to)	Notes
	Helsinki /Helsingfors	5 February 1949 7 April 1979	14 June 1974 30 October 1985	
	Tampere	8 December 1948	15 May 1976	

=== Greece ===
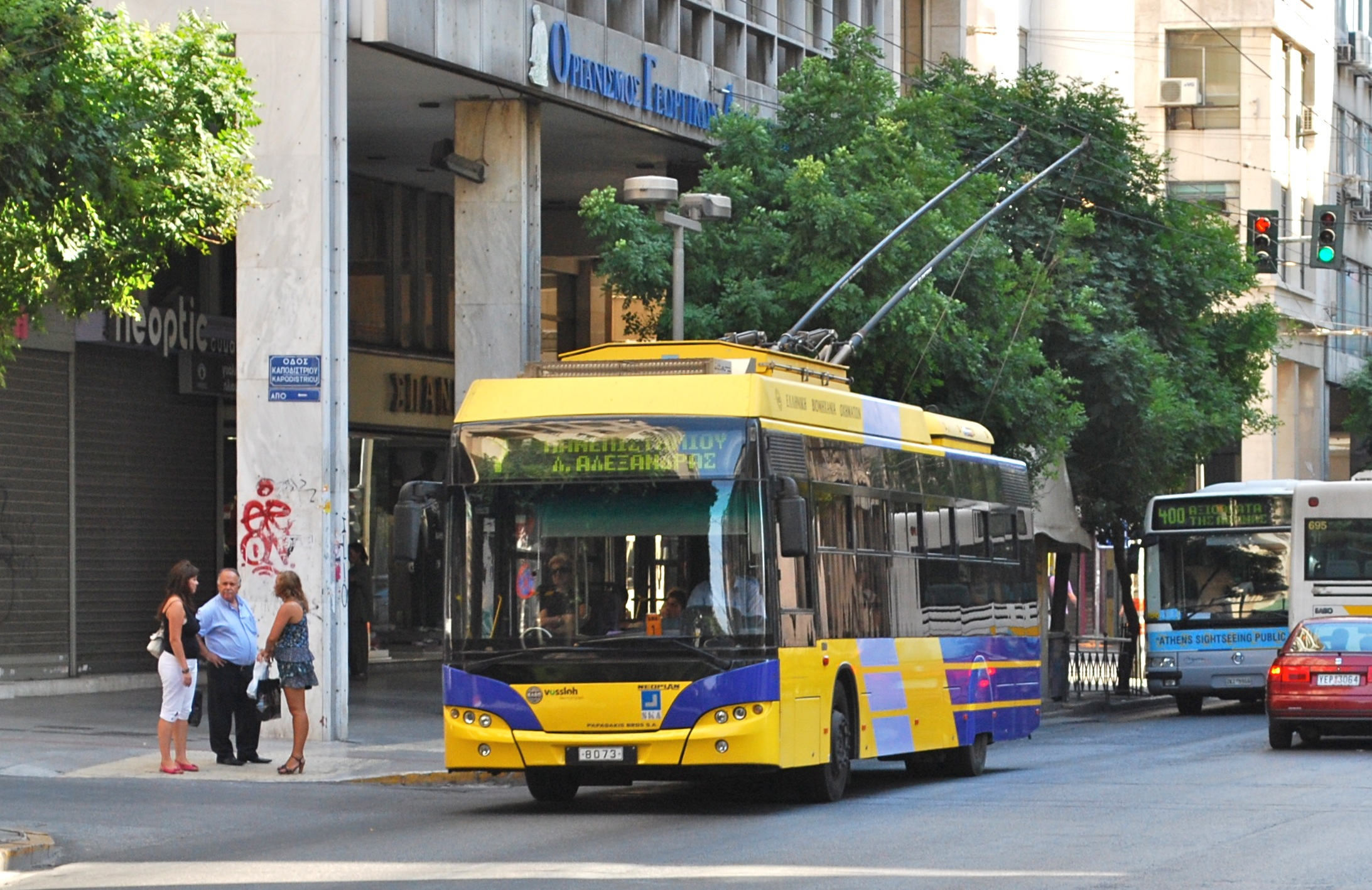
A trolleybus in Athens in 2009

Name of system	Location	Date (from)	Date (to)	Notes
OSY formerly IEM, ILPAP	Athens	27 December 1953		
IEM, ILPAP	Piraeus	1948		Service connection with Athens network built 1988. Piraeus system now operated as part of Athens system.

=== Hungary ===
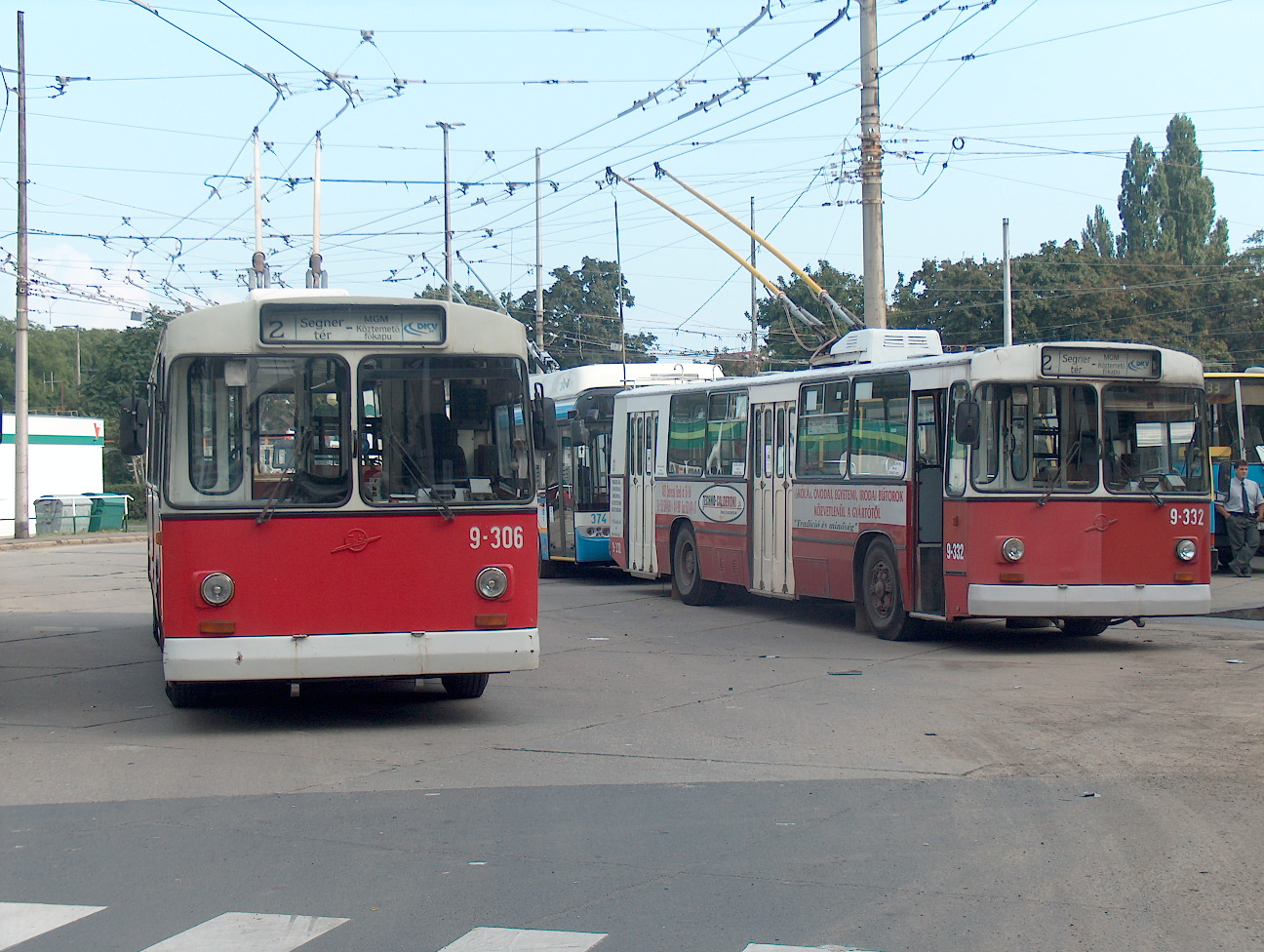
Ziu-9 trolleybuses in Debrecen

Name of system	Location	Date (from)	Date (to)	Notes
	Budapest	16 December 1933	21 September 1944	
	Budapest	21 December 1949		
	Debrecen	2 July 1985		
	Szeged	1 May 1979		

=== Latvia ===
Name of system	Location	Date (from)	Date (to)	Notes
Rīgas satiksme	Rīga	6 November 1947		See also Rīgas Satiksme.

=== Lithuania ===
Solaris Trollino 12 in Kaunas

Name of system	Location	Date (from)	Date (to)	Notes
Kauno autobusai	Kaunas	31 December 1965		
Vilniaus viešasis transportas	Vilnius	27 November 1956		See also Trolleybuses in Vilnius.

=== Moldova ===
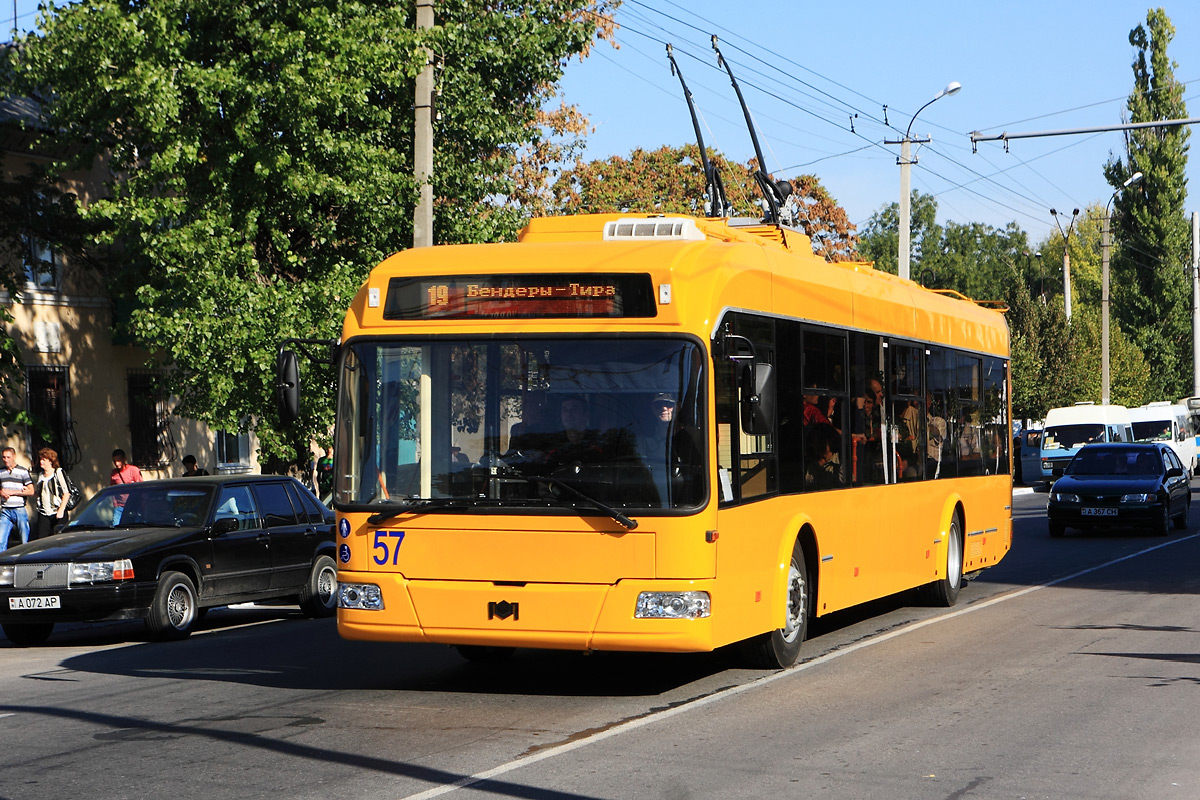
A Belkommunmash AKSM-321 trolleybus in Bender, Moldova.

Name of system	Location	Date (from)	Date (to)	Notes
Î.M. Direcția de troleibuze Bălți	Bălți	12 June 1972		See also Transport in Bălți
Regia Transport Electric Chișinău (RTEC)	Chișinău	12 October 1949		See also Trolleybuses in Chișinău
	Solonceni	1 May 1992	3 January 1994	2.9-km line connecting residential area of Solonceni village to administrative and employment centers.
	Tighina (Russian: Bendery / Бендеры)	1996		
	Tiraspol	1 November 1967		
	♦ Tiraspol - Tighina	19 June 1993		

=== Netherlands ===
==== Gelderland ====
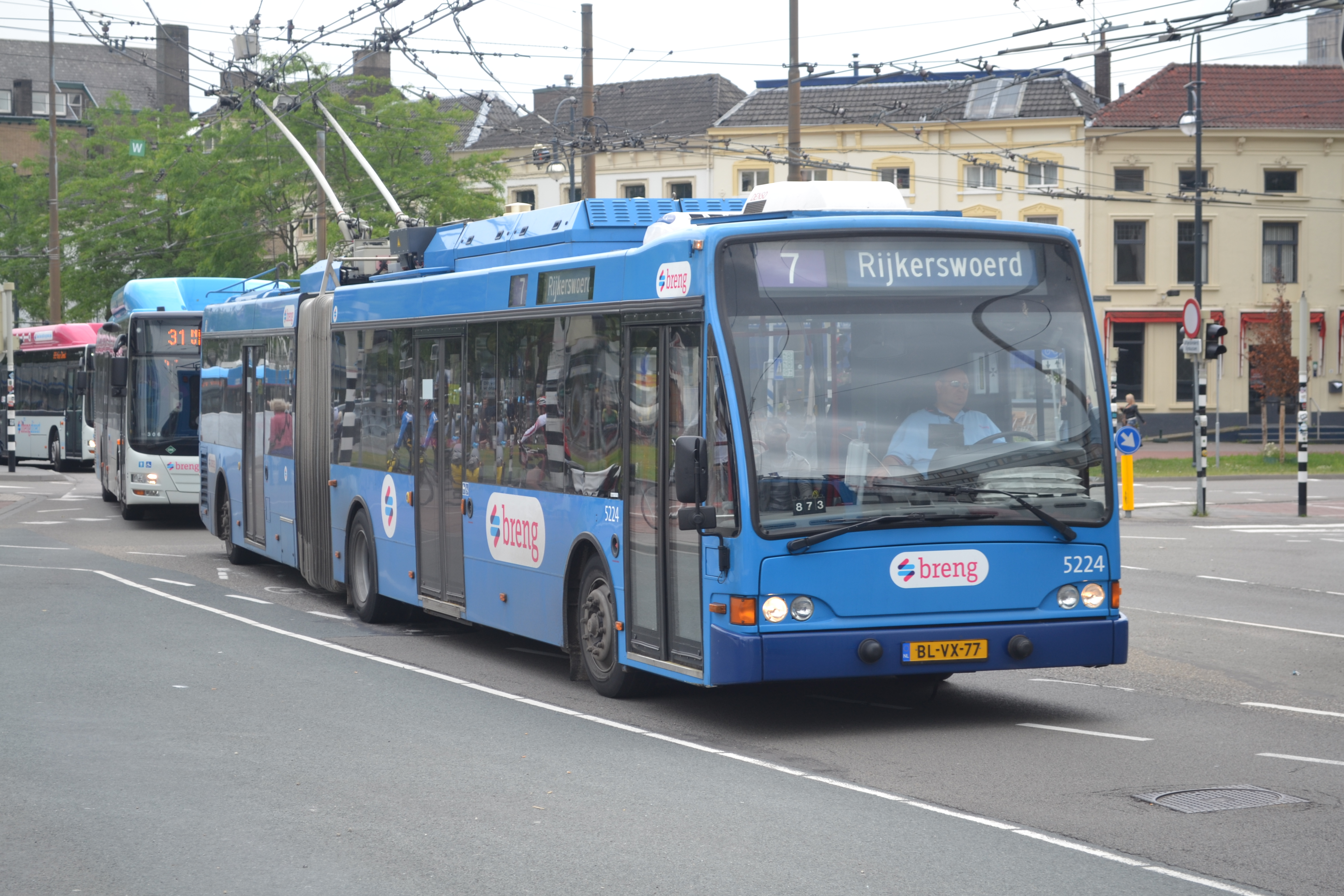
Trolleybus in Arnhem

Name of system	Location	Date (from)	Date (to)	Notes
	Arnhem	5 September 1949		See also Trolleybuses in Arnhem.
	Nijmegen	9 July 1952	29 March 1969	

==== Groningen ====
Name of system	Location	Date (from)	Date (to)	Notes
	Groningen	27 June 1927	9 November 1965	

==== South Holland (Zuid-Holland) ====
Name of system	Location	Date (from)	Date (to)	Notes
	(Rotterdam)			see note.

- Note for Rotterdam: Trolleybus overhead installed in the Maas tunnel in 1941, on instructions from German military authorities. Not used.

=== Norway ===
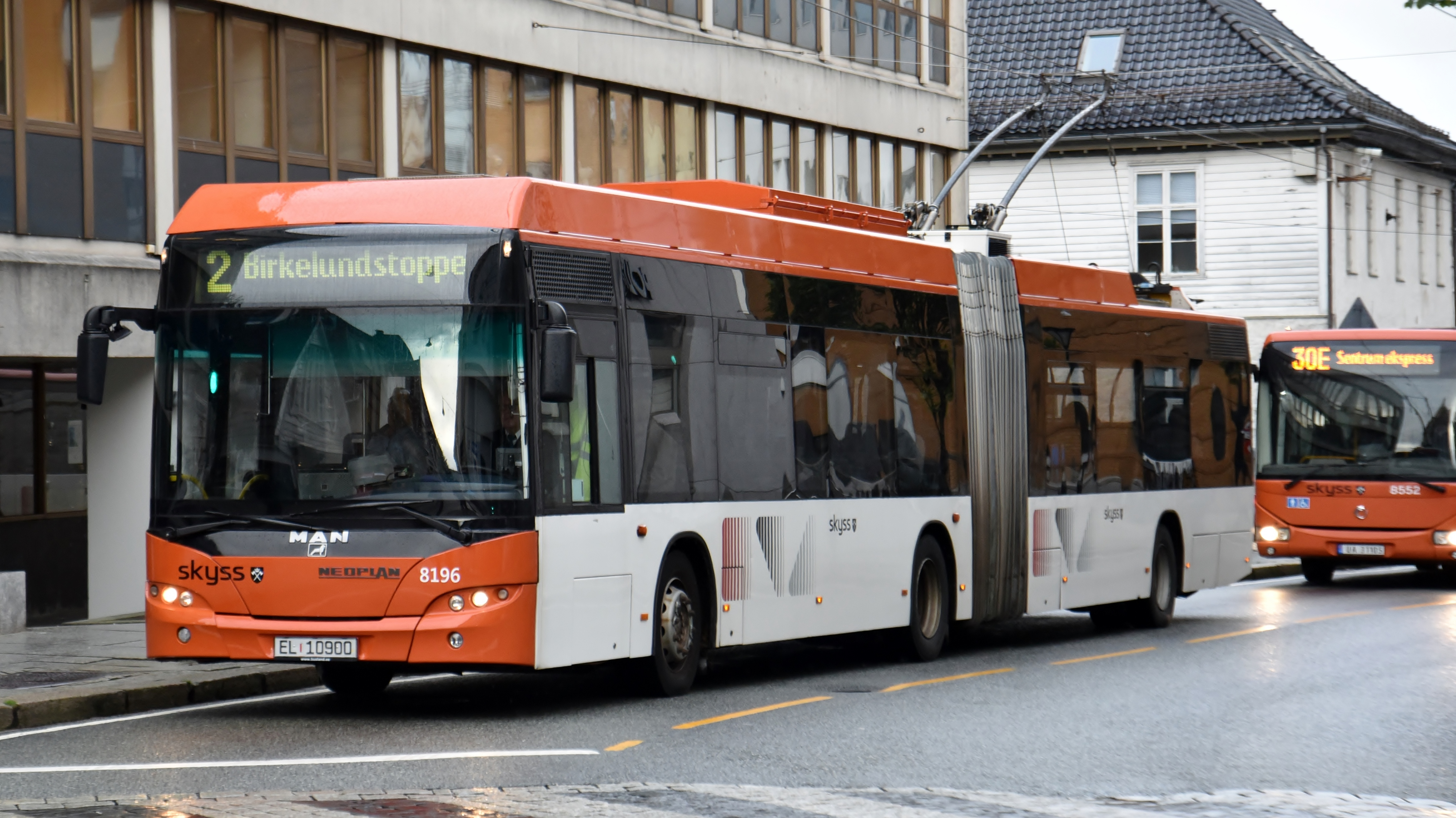
Trolleybus in Bergen

Name of system	Location	Date (from)	Date (to)	Notes
Tide	Bergen	24 February 1950		See also Trolleybuses in Bergen.
Drammen Kommunale Trikk	Drammen	15 December 1909	10 June 1967	See also Trolleybuses in Drammen.
AS Oslo Sporveier	Oslo	15 December 1940	15 February 1968	See also Trolleybuses in Oslo.
Stavanger Buss-Selskap	Stavanger	26 October 1947	12 January 1963	See also Trolleybuses in Stavanger.

=== Poland ===
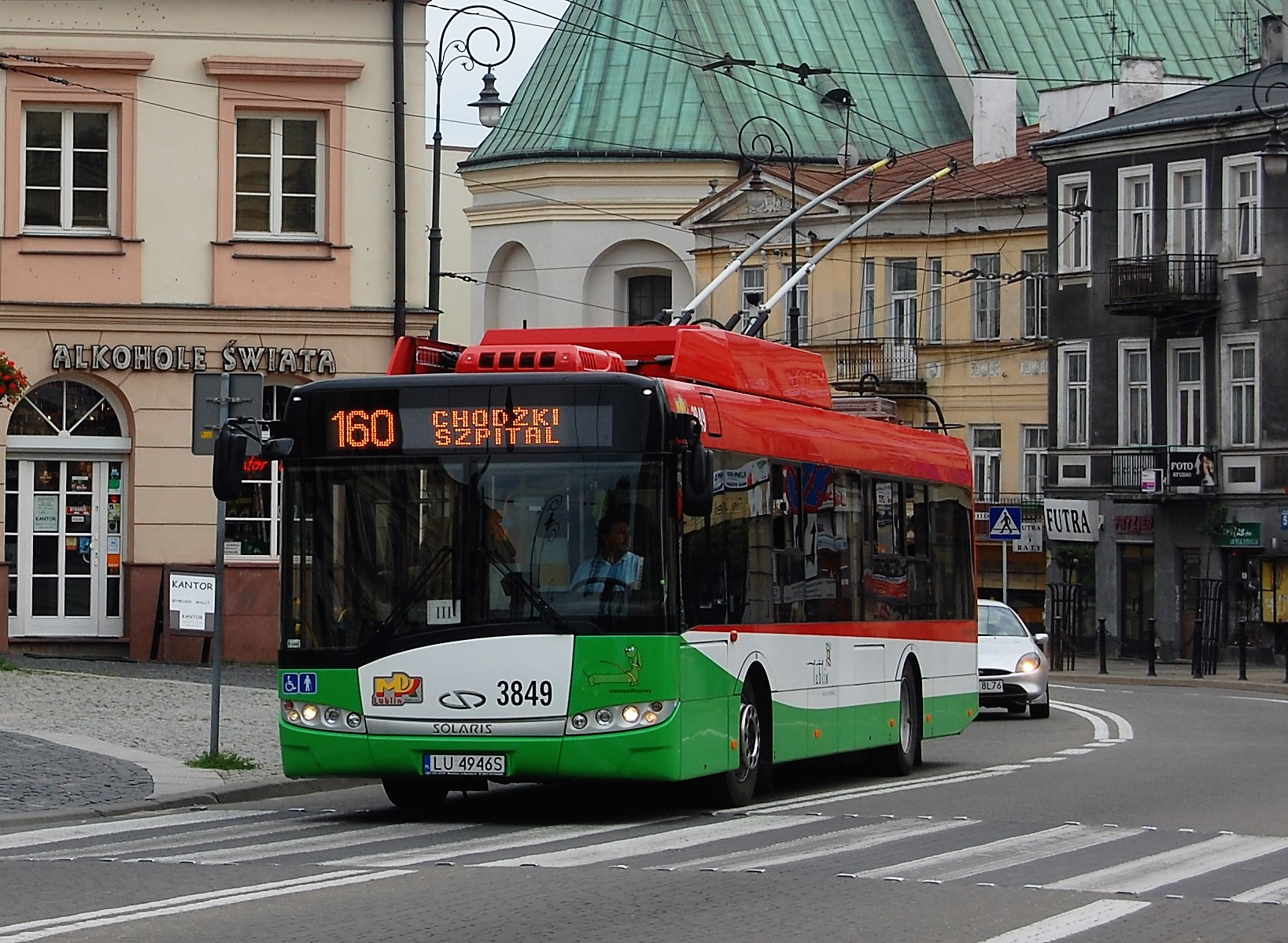
A trolleybus in Lublin

Name of system	Location	Date (from)	Date (to)	Notes
	Bydgoszcz	1943	27 January 1945	
	Dębica	12 November 1988	October 1990	See also Trolleybuses in Dębica.
	Gdańsk	18 September 1943	1945	
	Gdynia	18 October 1943		Two lines extend to the adjoining town of Sopot. See also Trolleybuses in Gdynia.
	Gorzów Wielkopolski	23 July 1943	30 January 1945	
	Jelenia Góra	1944	1945	
	Legnica	10 November 1943 15 September 1949	January 1945 31 December 1956	
	Lublin	21 July 1953		See also Trolleybuses in Lublin
	Olsztyn	1 September 1939 10 December 1946	1945 31 July 1971	
	Poznań	12 February 1930 1 March 1946	20 January 1945 29 March 1970	
	Słupsk	22 July 1985	18 October 1999	See also Trolleybuses in Słupsk.
	Tychy	1 October 1982		See also Trolleybuses in Tychy.
	Wałbrzych	27 October 1944	30 June 1973	
	Warsaw	5 January 1946 1 June 1983	29 June 1973 31 August 1995	See also Trolleybuses in Warsaw.
	Wrocław	16 March 1912	1914	

=== Portugal ===
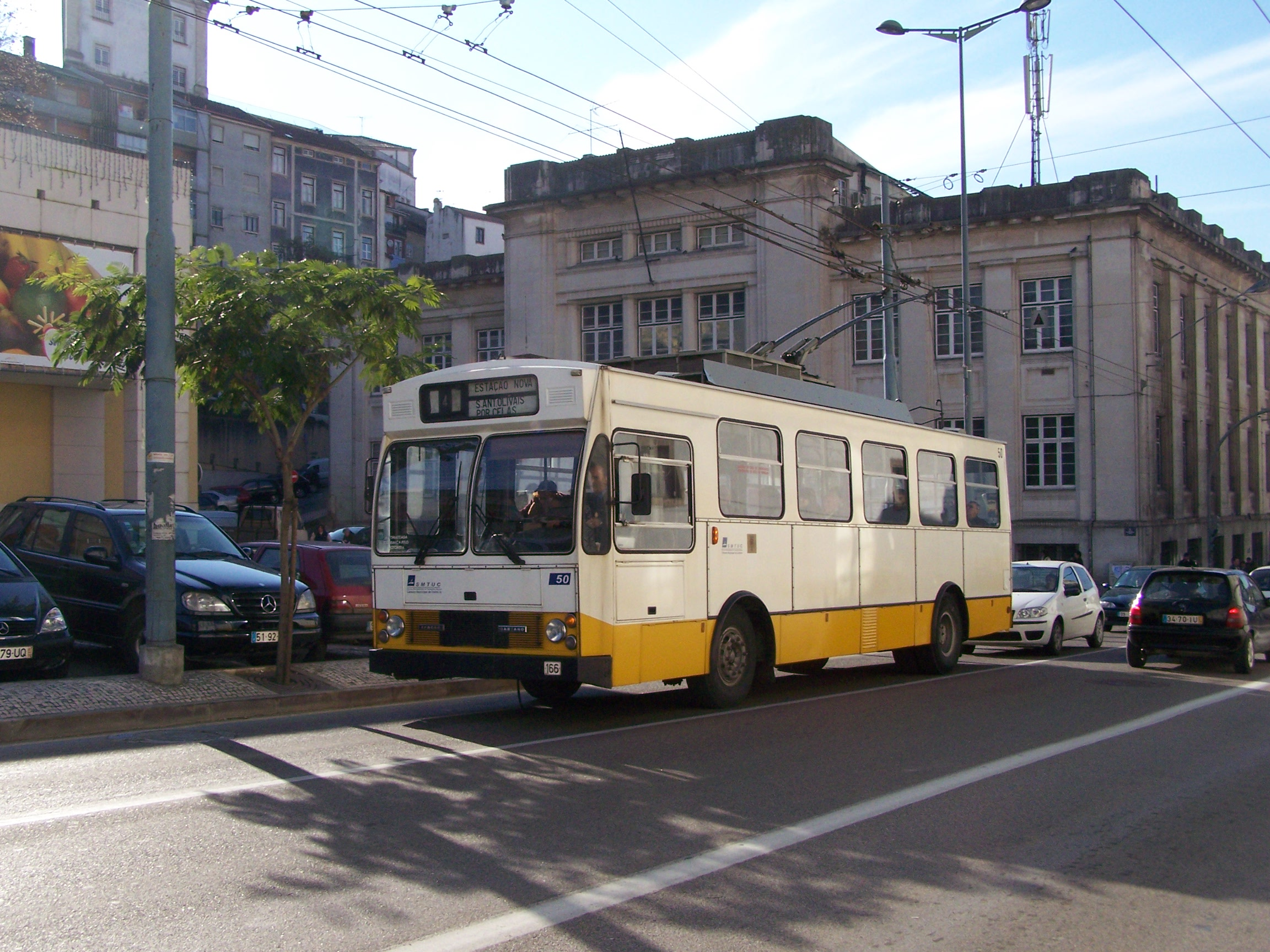
Trolleybus in Coimbra

Name of system	Location	Date (from)	Date (to)	Notes
	Braga	28 May 1963	10 September 1979	
	Coimbra	16 August 1947	March 2021	Service was suspended temporarily in March 2021, but the suspension was made permanent in July 2024. See also Trolleybuses in Coimbra.
	Porto	1 January 1959	27 December 1997	

=== Romania ===
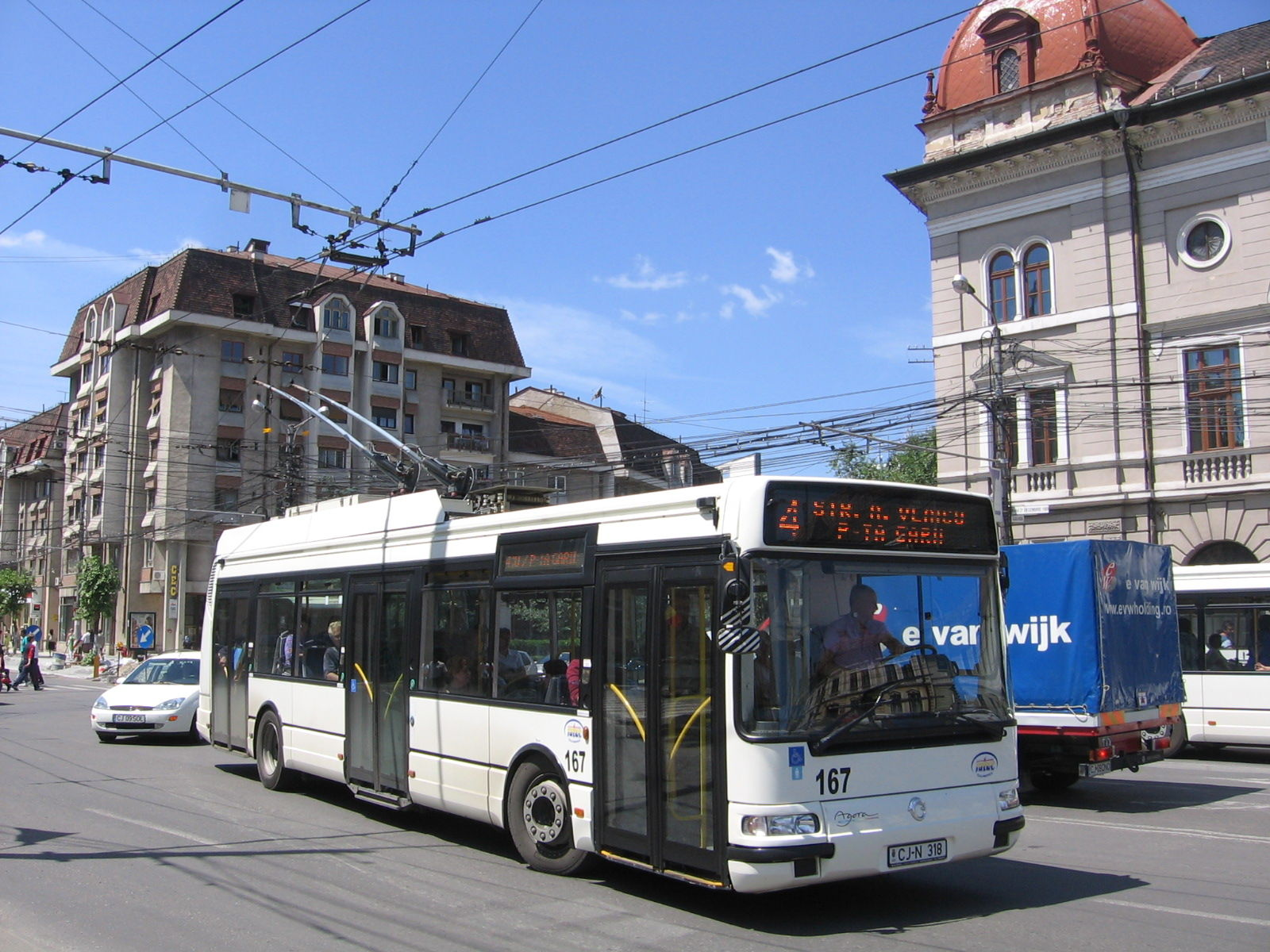
Irisbus Agora trolleybus in Cluj-Napoca

First trolleybus system in Romania opened in Chernivtsi on 1 February 1939. Today, the city is part of Ukraine.

Name of system	Location	Date (from)	Date (to)	Notes
SC Urbis SA	Baia Mare	16 February 1996		
SC Brăicar SA	Brăila	23 August 1989	December 1999	
part of the RAT network	Brașov	1 May 1959		
STB	București	10 November 1949		
CTP Cluj-Napoca	Cluj-Napoca	7 November 1959		
RATC Constanța	Constanța	5 July 1959	3 December 2010	System included interurban lines to Mamaia.
RAT Craiova	Craiova	9 May 1943	Oct 1944	New trolleybus system was planned in 2008, but the plans have not come to fruition.
Transurb Galați	Galați	23 August 1989		
RATP Iași	Iași	1 May 1985	4 March 2006	
SC Meditur Mediaș	Mediaș	22 December 1989		The only city in Romania that is not a county seat, and that has a trolleybus network
SC Troleibuzul SA	Piatra Neamț	22 December 1995	20 September 2019	System included suburban lines to Dumbrava Roșie and Săvinești.
RATP Ploiești	Ploiești	1 September 1997		
SC Transurban SA	Satu Mare	15 November 1994	9 March 2005	
SC Tursib SA	Sibiu	4 August 1904	18 October 1904	See also Gleislose Bahn Hermannstadt (in German) for the old system, the German name for the first system, because this part of Romania was part of Austria-Hungary until 1918.
SC Tursib SA	Sibiu	17 August 1983	14 November 2009	See also Tursib, the system's operator after mid-1998.
SC Loctrans SA	Slatina	30 May 1996	31 March 2006	
SC Transport Public Local SA	Suceava	15 August 1987	2 April 2006	
SC Transport Public SA	Târgoviște	4 January 1995	August 2005	
SC Transloc SA	Târgu Jiu	20 June 1995		System includes interurban line to Bârsești.
RATT	Timișoara	15 November 1942		System includes interurban lines to Dumbrăvița and Ghiroda
SC Transurb SA	Vaslui	1 May 1994	July 2009	
SC Transurb SA	Vaslui	4 August 2023		Underwent a complete reconstruction in 2011–2016. Test runs with 3 used trolleybuses from Salzburg carried out in spring 2016. Reopened in 2023 after delivery of 10 new Solaris trolleybuses. See Trolleybuses in Vaslui.

=== Russia ===
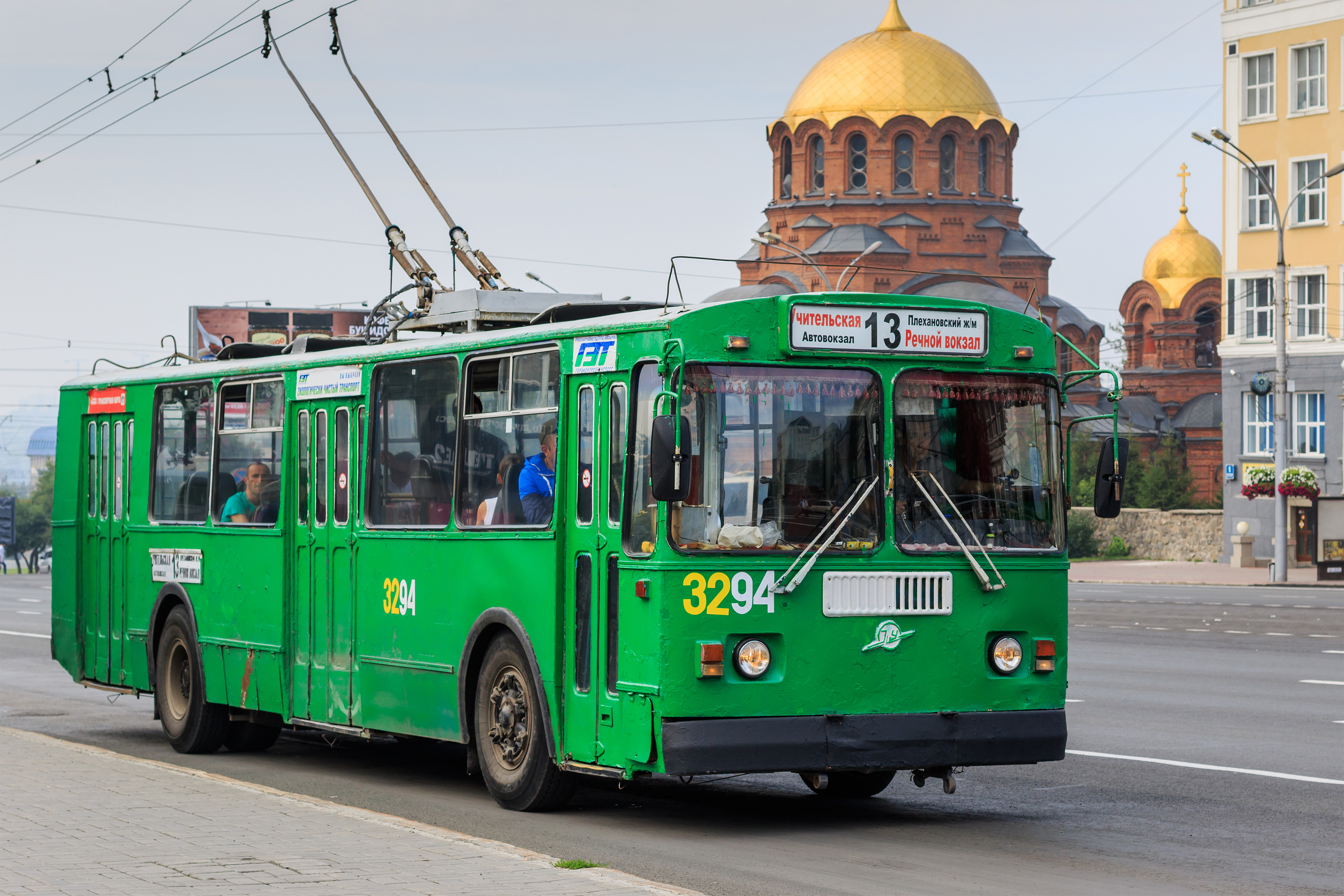
Trolleybus in Novosibirsk

=== Serbia ===
Name of system	Location	Date (from)	Date (to)	Notes
GSP Belgrade	Belgrade	22 June 1947		See also Trolleybuses in Belgrade.

=== Slovakia ===
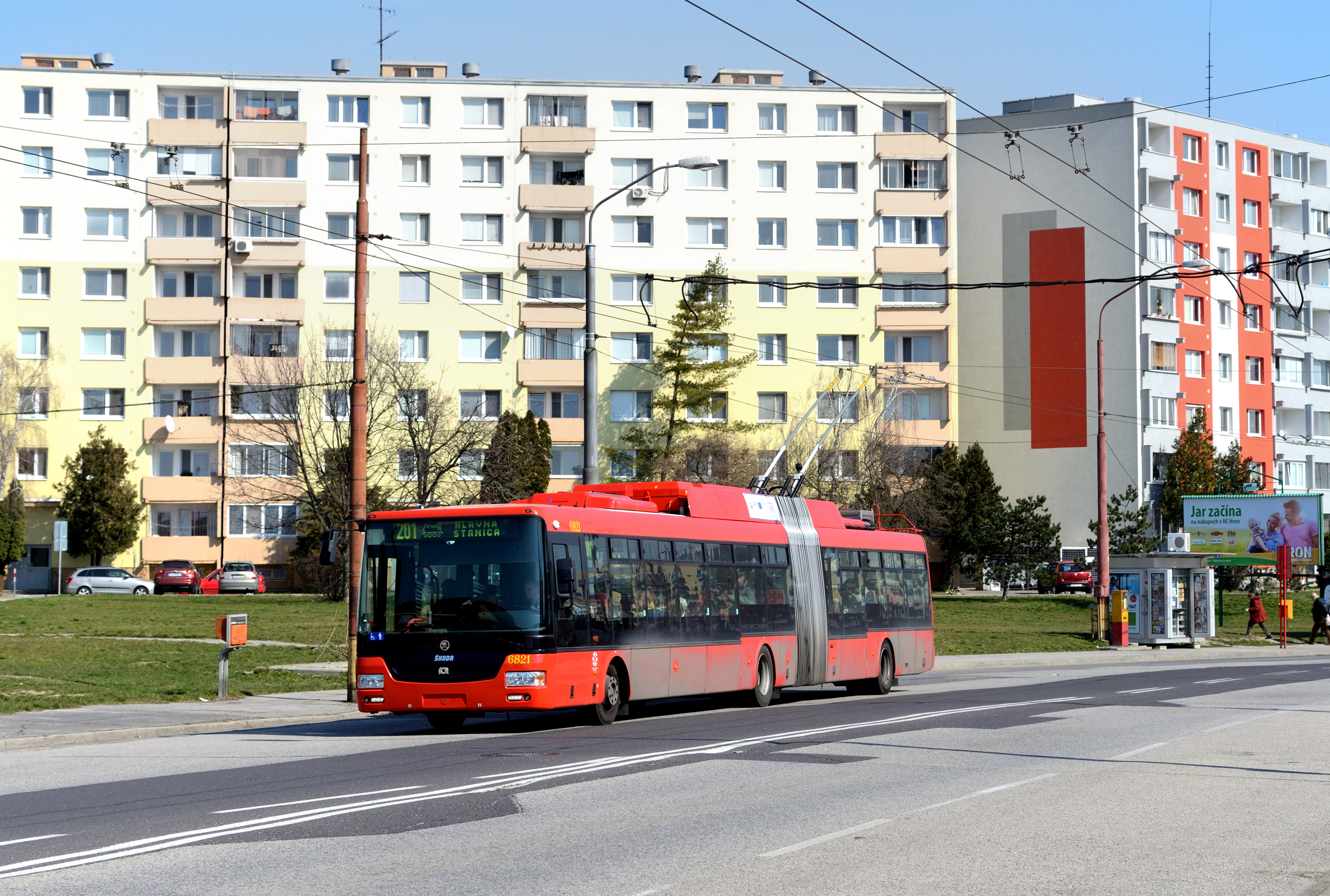
Škoda 31Tr SOR in Bratislava

Name of system	Location	Date (from)	Date (to)	Notes
	Banská Bystrica	24 August 1989		Operation was suspended 1 January 2006 – 10 November 2007.
Name of the first system Gleislose Bahn Preßburg–Eisenbrünnl	Bratislava	19 July 1909 31 July 1941	1915 -	See also Gleislose Bahn Preßburg–Eisenbrünnl (in German), the German name for the first system, because Slovakia was part of Austria-Hungary until 1918.
	Košice	27 September 1993	30 January 2015	System's closure was initially a suspension of service due to major road construction in city center, but it was later decided not to reopen the system. However, the system reopened on 10 March 2019, with limited passenger service (only on Sundays).
Gleislose Bahn Poprád–Ótátrafüred	Poprad	2 August 1904	August 1906	See also Trolejbusová doprava vo Vysokých Tatrách (in Slovak) or Gleislose Bahn Poprád–Ótátrafüred (in German), the German name for the first system, because Slovakia was part of Austria-Hungary until 1918.
	Prešov	13 May 1962		
	Žilina	17 November 1994		

=== Slovenia ===
Name of system	Location	Date (from)	Date (to)	Notes
	Ljubljana	6 October 1951	4 September 1971	
Gleislose Bahn Pirano–Portorose	Piran	24 October 1909	19 July 1912	See also Piranski trolejbus (in Slovene) or Gleislose Bahn Pirano–Portorose (in German), the German name for the first system, because Slovenia was part of Austria-Hungary until 1918, the first trolleybus system on the Balkans.

=== Sweden ===
Name of system	Location	Date (from)	Date (to)	Notes
	Gothenburg	2 October 1940	14 November 1964	.
	Landskrona	27 September 2003		.
	Stockholm	20 January 1941	30 August 1964	.
	Västerås	11 November 1938	1948	1 km demonstration line .

=== Turkey ===
See Asia section of list, above. Although the Istanbul trolleybus system served the European part of that city, the country's four other trolleybus systems were, or are, all located in the Asian part of Turkey.

== Oceania ==
=== Australia ===
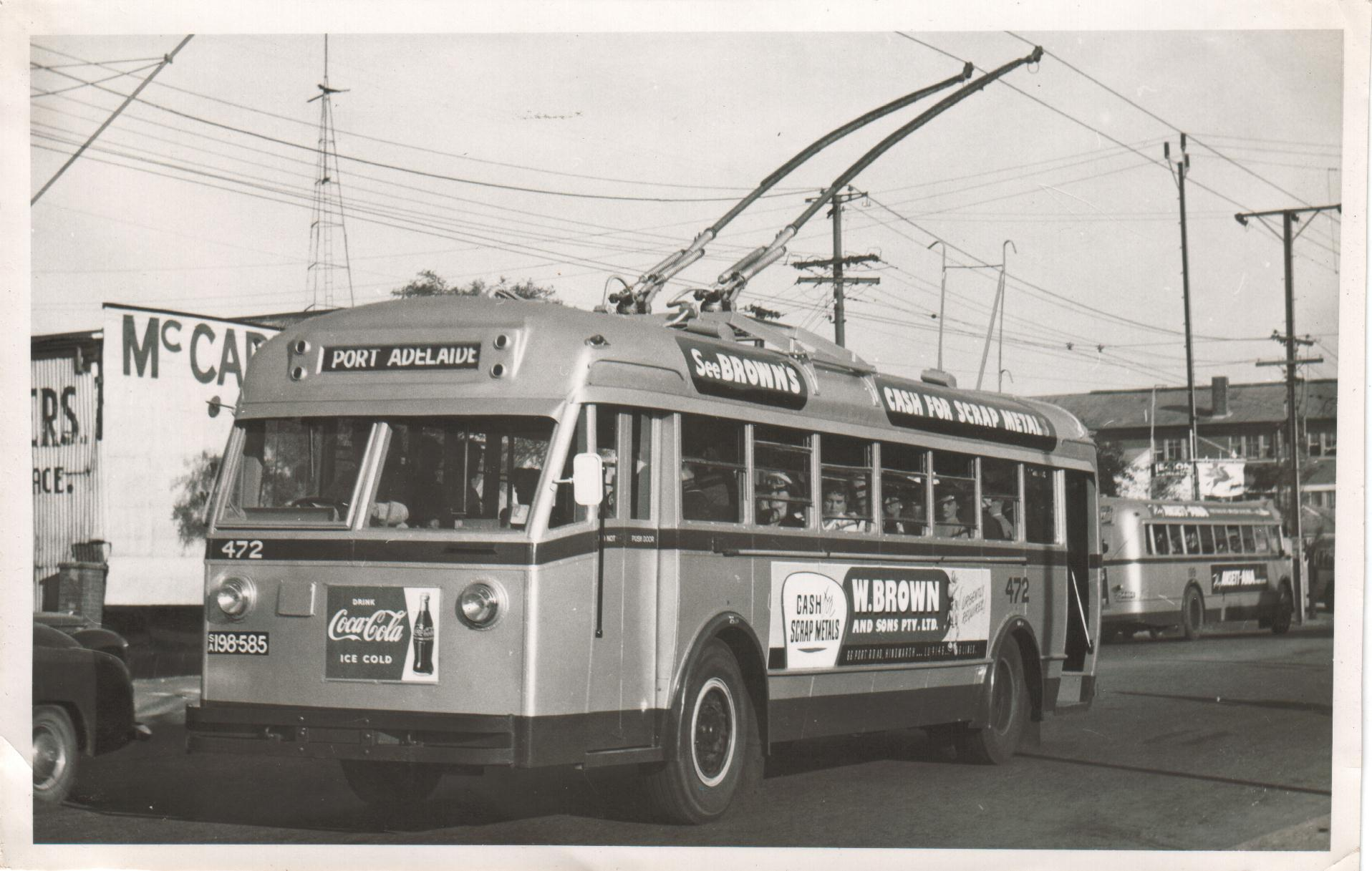
Adelaide in Australia had a trolleybus system from 1937 to 1963.

==== New South Wales ====
Name of system	Location	Date (from)	Date (to)	Notes
	Sydney:			See also Trolleybuses in Sydney.
	♦ City	22 January 1934	12 April 1948	
	♦ Kogarah	3 July 1937	29 August 1959	

==== Queensland ====
Name of system	Location	Date (from)	Date (to)	Notes
Brisbane City Council	Brisbane	2 August 1951	13 March 1969	See also Trolleybuses in Brisbane.

==== South Australia ====
Name of system	Location	Date (from)	Date (to)	Notes
Municipal Tramways Trust	Adelaide	2 March 1932 5 September 1937	11 August 1934 12 July 1963	Experimental. - See also Trolleybuses in Adelaide.

==== Tasmania ====
Name of system	Location	Date (from)	Date (to)	Notes
Hobart City Council; Municipal Tramways Trust	Hobart	29 October 1935	24 November 1968	See also Trolleybuses in Hobart
Launceston City Council; Metropolitan Transport Trust	Launceston	21 December 1951	26 July 1968	See also Trolleybuses in Launceston, Tasmania.

==== Western Australia ====
Name of system	Location	Date (from)	Date (to)	Notes
Western Australian Government Tramways (1 October 1933 to June 1960); Metropolitan (Perth) Passenger Transport Trust (June 1960 to 29 August 1969)	Perth	1 October 1933	29 August 1969	See also Trolleybuses in Perth.

=== New Zealand ===
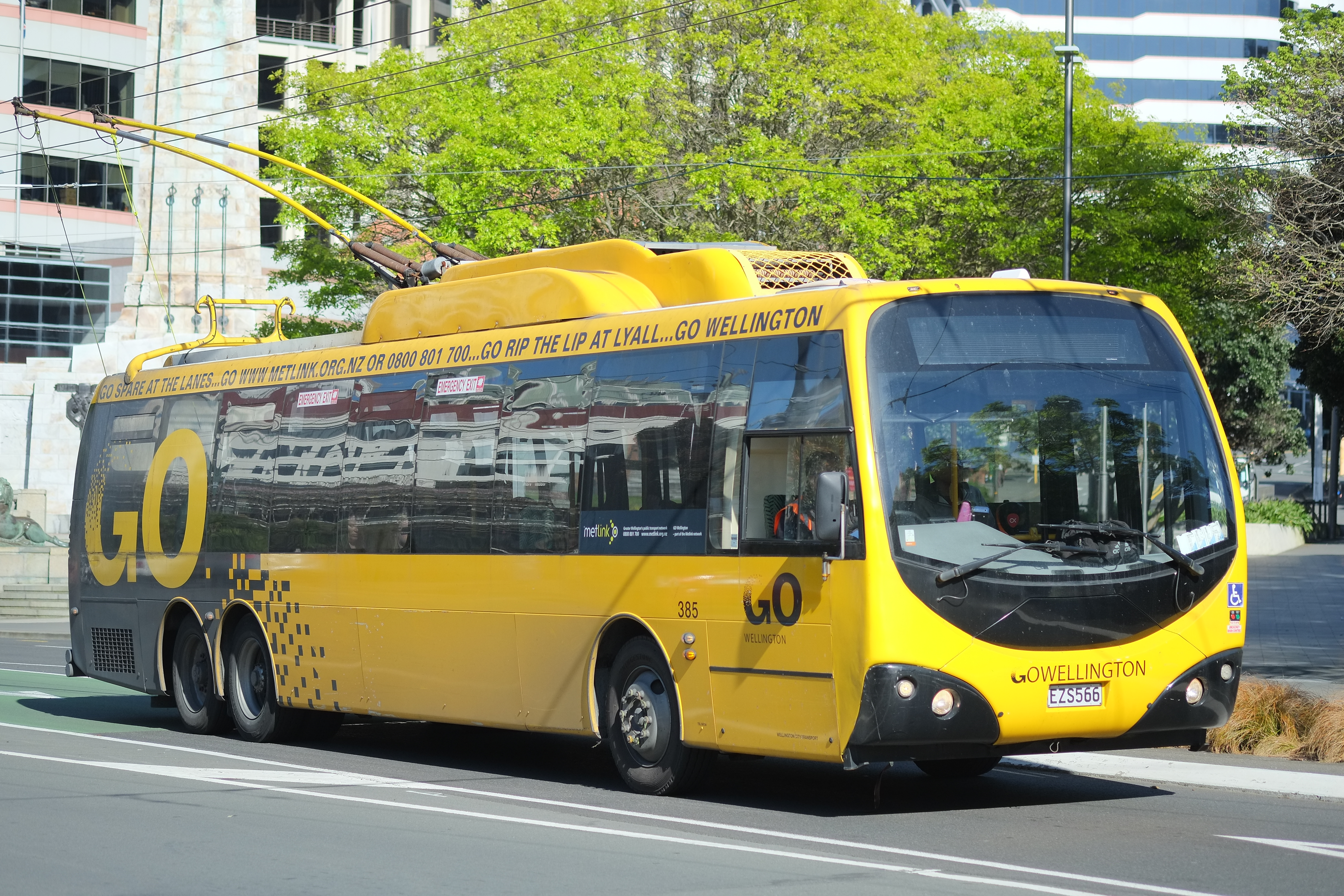
A trolleybus in Wellington, New Zealand

Name of system	Location	Date (from)	Date (to)	Notes
Farmers Trading Company	Auckland	19 December 1938		Private; absorbed by ATB 1960s
Auckland Transport Board, then Auckland Regional Authority	Auckland	24 September 1949	26 September 1980	See also Trolleybuses in Auckland
Christchurch Tramway Board	Christchurch	5 July 1931	8 November 1956	See also Christchurch Transport Board
New Plymouth City Council	New Plymouth	30 October 1950	7 October 1967	See also New Plymouth City Transport
Dunedin City Transport & Electricity Department	Dunedin	24 December 1950	31 March 1982	World's southernmost trolleybus system. See also Trolleybuses in Dunedin
Wellington City Council	Wellington	29 September 1924; 20 June 1949	May 1932; 31 October 2017	See also Trolleybuses in Wellington.

=== United States (territories only, in Oceania) ===
==== Hawaii (Territory of) ====
Name of system	Location	Date (from)	Date (to)	Notes
Honolulu Rapid Transit Company Limited	Honolulu	1936	-	Demonstration
Honolulu Rapid Transit Company Limited	Honolulu	1 January 1938	22 June 1957	

- Note: The trolleybus system existed only in the period before Hawaii became a U.S. state. For convenience, it is also included in List of trolleybus systems in the United States.

== See also ==
- Trolleybus usage by country
- List of current operating trolleybus systems
- List of bus operating companies
- List of bus rapid transit systems
- List of town tramway systems
- List of tram and light rail transit systems
- Lists of urban rail transit systems

== Books ==
- Gregoris, Paolo; Rizzoli, Francesco; and Serra, Claudio. 2003. "Giro d'Italia in filobus" (ISBN 88-7785-193-7). Cortona: Editore Calosci.
- Jones, David. Australian Trolleybuses. Wellington: City Tramway Publications.
- Mackinger, Gunter. 1979. "Obus in Österreich" (ISBN 3-900134-62-6). (Eisenbahn-Sammelheft Nr. 16.) Wien: Verlag Slezak.
- Millar, Sean. 1986. "Trolleybuses in New Zealand" (ISBN 0-908726-20-1). Auckland: Millar Publishing.
- Murray, Alan. 2000. "World Trolleybus Encyclopaedia" (ISBN 0-904235-18-1). Yateley, Hampshire, UK: Trolleybooks.
- Pabst, Martin. 1989. "Tram & Trolley in Africa" (ISBN 3-88490-152-4). Krefeld: Röhr Verlag GMBH.
- Peschkes, Robert. "World Gazetteer of Tram, Trolleybus, and Rapid Transit Systems."
  - Part One, Latin America (ISBN 1-898319-02-2). 1980. Exeter, UK: Quail Map Company.
  - Part Two, Asia+USSR / Africa / Australia (ISBN 0-948619-00-7). 1987. London: Rapid Transit Publications.
  - Part Three, Europe (ISBN 0-948619-01-5). 1993. London: Rapid Transit Publications.
  - Part Four, North America (ISBN 0-948619-06-6). 1998. London: Rapid Transit Publications.
- Sebree, Mac, and Paul Ward. 1974. "The Trolley Coach in North America" (Interurbans Special 59). Los Angeles: Interurbans.
- Stock, Werner. 1987. "Obus-Anlagen in Deutschland" (ISBN 3-926882-00-X). Bielefeld: Hermann Busch Verlag.
- "Straßenbahnatlas ehem. Sowjetunion" / "Tramway Atlas of the former USSR" (ISBN 3-926524-15-4). 1996. Berlin: Arbeitsgemeinschaft Blickpunkt Straßenbahn, in conjunction with Light Rail Transit Association, London.
- "Straßenbahnatlas Rumänien" (compiled by Andreas Günther, Sergei Tarkhov and Christian Blank; ISBN 3-926524-23-5). 2004. Berlin: Arbeitsgemeinschaft Blickpunkt Straßenbahn.
- Tarkhov, Sergei. 2000. "Empire of the Trolleybus: Vol 1 - Russia" (ISBN 0-948619-02-3). London: Rapid Transit Publications.
- 吉川文夫 (Yoshikawa, Fumio). 1995. 日本のトロリーバス (Nippon no "trolleybus") (ISBN 4-88548-066-3). Tokyo: kk Denkisha-kenkyûkai.

== Periodicals ==
- "Trolleybus Magazine" (ISSN 0266-7452). National Trolleybus Association (UK). Bimonthly.
- Tarkhov, Sergei and Dmitriy Merzlov. "North Korean Surprises - Part 3". (Trolleybus Magazine No. 246, November–December 2002).
