= Trolleybuses in Ashgabat =

Public transit system in Ashgabat, Turkmenistan

Ashgabat trolleybus system

Operation
- Locale: Ashgabat, Turkmenistan
- Open: 19 October 1964
- Close: 31 December 2011
- Status: Closed
- Routes: 7

The Ashgabat trolleybus system formed part of the public transport network in Ashgabat, the capital city of Turkmenistan. It was the only trolleybus system ever in that country.

== History ==
Opened on 19 October 1964, the system was operated during the Soviet era by various Soviet-built trolleybuses, which by 2011 had all been withdrawn. The system closed at the end of 2011, with the last day of service being 31 December 2011.

== Lines ==
In 2011, its final year of operation, the system was made up of the following seven lines: 1, 2, 2A, 3, 5, 7 and 8.

== Fleet ==
In 2011, the Ashgabat trolleybus fleet was made up exclusively of Škoda 14TrM trolleybuses, introduced to the fleet in 2000 and financed by the World Bank.

== See also ==
- List of trolleybus systems
- Trolleybuses in former Soviet Union countries
