= Trolleybuses in Nakhchivan =

Trolley line in Nakhichevan

Nakhchivan trolleybus system

Operation
- Locale: Nakhchivan, Azerbaijan
- Open: 3 November 1986
- Close: April 2004
- Status: Closed
- Lines: 3 (max)

The Nakhchivan trolleybus system was a network of trolleybus routes that formed part of the public transport system in Nakhchivan, the capital of the eponymous Nakhchivan Autonomous Republic of Azerbaijan, for nearly 20 years from 1986.

The system was opened on 3 November 1986. In 1990, the fleet comprised 29 vehicles of type ZiU-9; at its height, the system consisted of three lines. It was closed in April 2004.

== See also ==
- History of Nakhchivan
- List of trolleybus systems
- Trolleybuses in former Soviet Union countries
- Trolleybuses in Baku
- Trolleybuses in Ganja
- Trolleybuses in Sumgait
- Trolleybuses in Mingachevir
