= Trolleybuses in Kathmandu =

Kathmandu trolleybus system
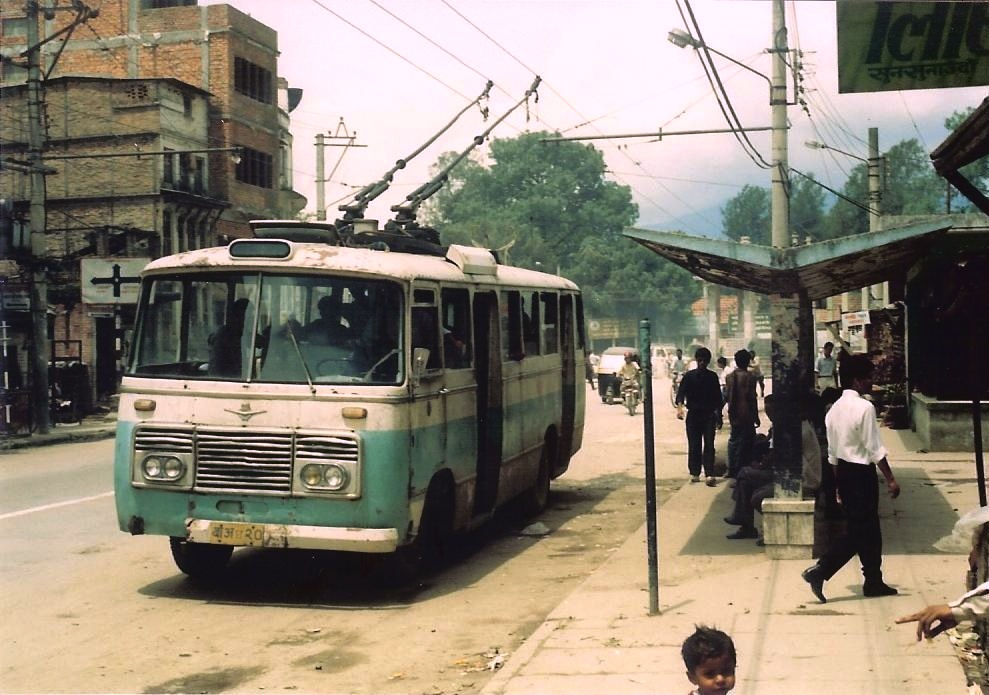
- A Shanghai SK541 in Kathmandu, August 1993.

Operation
- Locale: Kathmandu, Nepal
- Open: 28 December 1975
- Close: November 2008 (suspended); November 2009 (official closure)
- Status: Closed
- Routes: 1
- Operators: Nepal Trolley Bus Service (NTBS) (to 2001); Kathmandu Metropolitan City (KMC) (from 2003)

Infrastructure
- Stock: 32 (maximum)

Statistics
- Route length: 13 km (8 mi)
Overview

The Kathmandu trolleybus system once served Kathmandu, the capital city of the then Kingdom of Nepal. It was the only trolleybus system ever to be constructed in the country.

Opened on 28 December 1975 the system was a gift to Nepal from the People's Republic of China. It endured a somewhat chequered history, particularly in the first decade of the 21st century. Operation was suspended completely for almost two years, from 19 December 2001 until 1 September 2003, because of maintenance, financial and political issues. When service was reinstated in 2003, it did not cover the route's outer half, between Koteshwor and Surya Binak, serving only about 5 km between Tripureshwor and Koteshwor.

Operations on the system were suspended again, and for the final time, in late November 2008, and the system was formally closed (without ever resuming operation) in November 2009.

== See also ==
- History of Kathmandu
- Transport in Kathmandu
- List of trolleybus systems
