= Public transport in Veliko Tarnovo =

Public transport in Veliko Tarnovo, is the system of public transportation in the city of Veliko Tarnovo, Bulgaria. Since 2006, it consists entirely of buses.

== History ==
Public transport in the Veliko Tarnovo was created, after the town saw rapid growth due to the country-wide trend of urbanization in the 1950s. The first line in the city, was between the old part of the town and the new part of the town. The first intercity bus station in the city was built in the 1930s, in the south part of town, near the city's train station.

== Bus transport ==
The first public buses in the town were Hansa-Lloyds delivered in 1939, which served the first bus line. This line had around 14 stops. It starts from the train stop Trapezitsa in the old part-Charevetz hill-Old Post-Old theater-neighborhood Marno pole-fire service-villa of Nikola Petkov-fountain Katchica

== Trolleybus transport ==
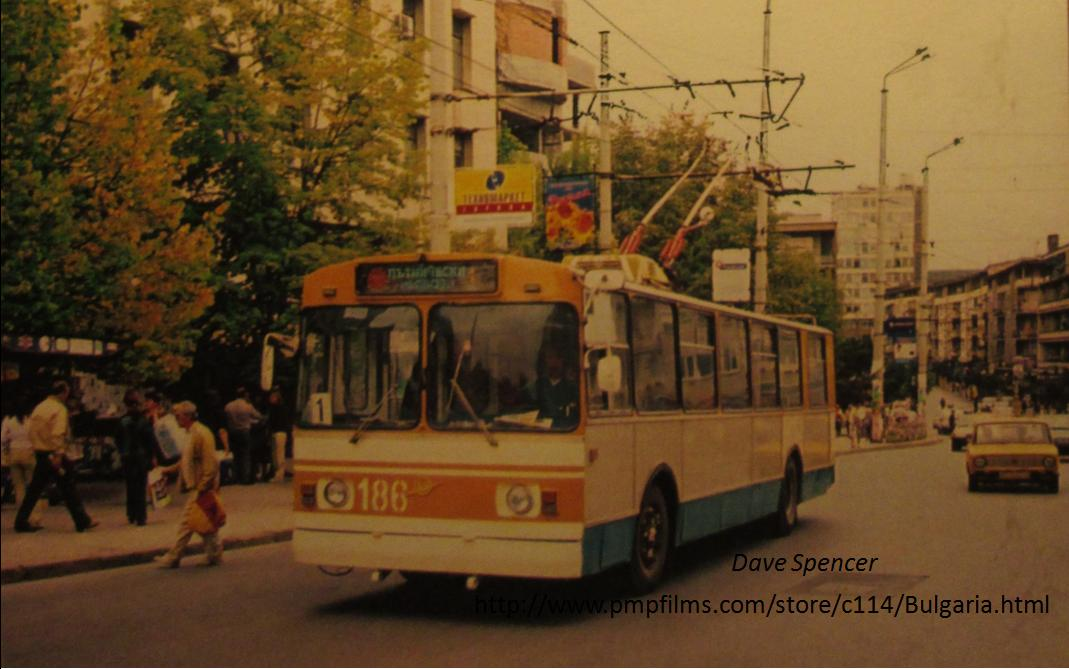
Trolleybus in 2000

Trolleybuses were part of Veliko Tarnovo's public transport from September 1988 until 31 March 2009. The system consisted of two routes (numbered 1 and 2) which connected the city centre with Dalga Laka industrial estate in the southern part of the city. Trolleybuses did not operate in the historic part of the city centre. In November 2008 trolleybus service was shortened due to road construction works of the Kachitsa intersection. Service to the industrial estate was suspended and trolleybuses operated on a loop route within the inner city. In March 2009 expansion of the construction site created a gap in the overhead wiring which required the suspension of all trolleybus services. Initially announced as temporary, the closure became permanent. The overhead wires were dismantled in 2016.

The system was served by a total of 15 vehicles from the type ZiU-682V built between 1987 and 1989. All 15 trolleybuses were scrapped in 2011.

In the 1980s there was a project to connect Veliko Tarnovo's trolleybus system with the trolleybus system of neighbouring towns Gorna Oryahovitsa and Lyaskovets which was under construction at that time. However the latter was never completed and the partially installed overhead wires were removed.

== Sources ==
- Article about the public transport(Bulgarian)
