= Trolleybuses in Gdynia =

Gdynia trolleybus system
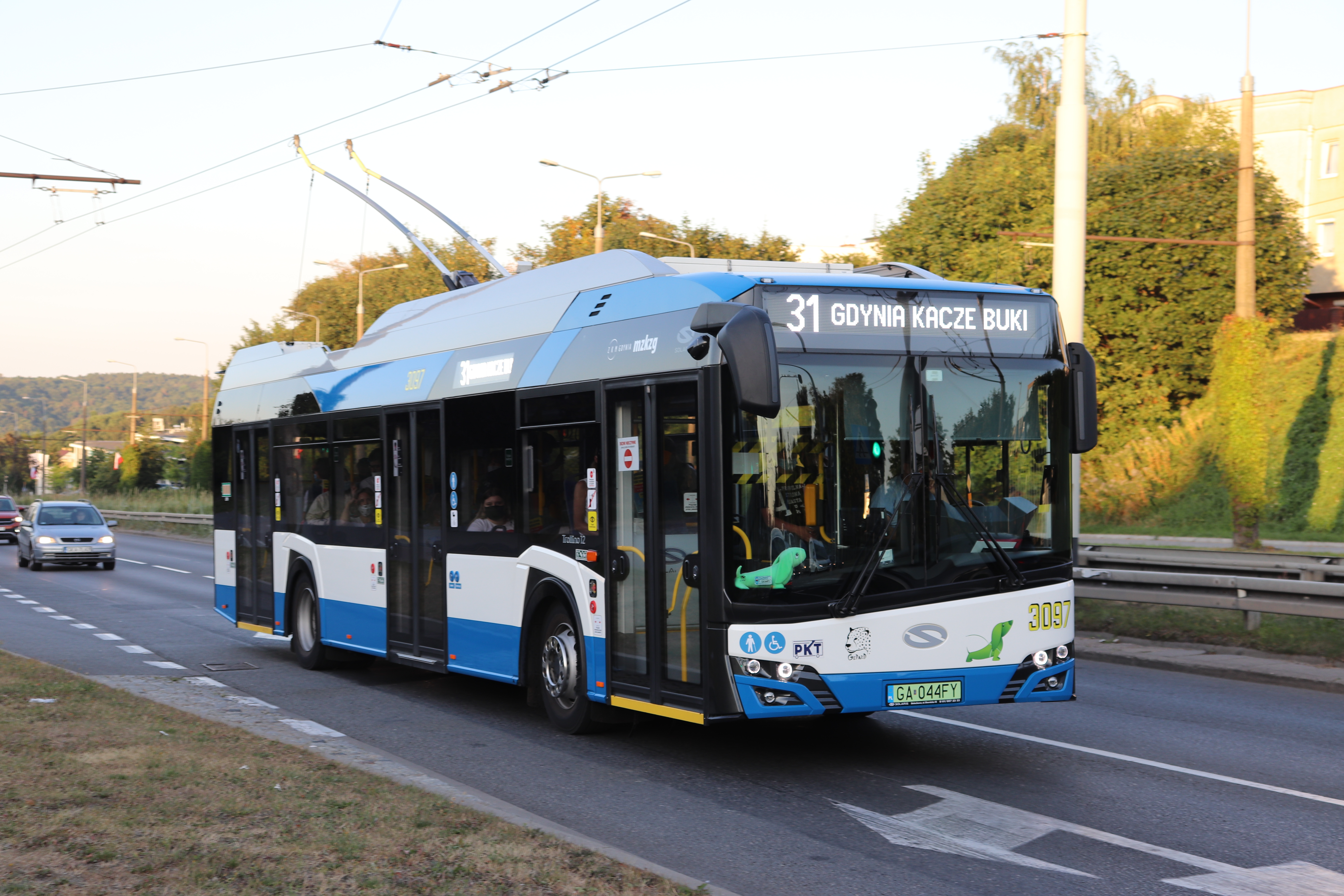
- A Solaris Trollino 12T in Gdynia

Operation
- Locale: Gdynia, Poland
- Open: 18 September 1943
- Routes: 18
- Operator: PKT w Gdyni

Infrastructure
- Electrification: 600 V DC parallel overhead lines

Statistics
- Route length: 96 km (60 mi)
Overview
- Website: http://zkmgdynia.pl/ ZKM (in Polish)

The Gdynia trolleybus system serves the cities of Gdynia and Sopot, Poland. It is one of three remaining trolleybus systems in Poland (the others being those in Lublin and Tychy).

The system was opened on 18 September 1943. It consists of 18 lines (numbered from 21 to 34, and 181, 326, 710 and 723). One stretch with three lines (21, 31 and 181) extend to the neighbouring city of Sopot.

The system is operated by the Przedsiębiorstwo Komunikacji Trolejbusowej (Trolleybus Transport Company, PKT) working under the commission of Zarząd Komunikacji Miejskiej (Public Transport Bureau, ZKM).

Every year, the trolleybuses travel over four million kilometres and transport c. 350 million passengers.

== PKT in Gdynia ==
PKT is the only company that offers trolleybus services in Gdynia. It is a limited liability company that only gains profit from the Gmina Gdynia. On 1 January 1998, PKT was split from Przedsiębiorstwo Komunikacji Miejskiej. It hires c. 340 workers. Four trade unions exist in PKT. The head of management in PKT is Piotr Małolepszy, and the deputy is Tomasz Labuda. The company is headquartered near ulica Zakręt to Oksywie in Gdynia.

== History ==
The idea to establish a trolleybus network in Gdynia began in the administration of Gdynia before the Second World War. Despite serious planning, instead of trolleybuses, in 1929, it was decided to establish a bus network. However, buses were significantly more expensive to use, and they were not worthwhile in a rapidly expanding city.

=== Creation ===
Occupying Germans established the trolleybus network due to lack of fuel. On 18 September 1943, the first trolleybus drove in Gdynia (German in that time: Gotenhafen), running from the offices of the city to Hauptbahnhof station. Initially, ten Henschel trolleybuses serviced the network, fitted with AEG electric systems. The bodies of the trolleybuses were created by Danziger Waggonfabrik (Polish: Gdańska Fabryka Wagonów, Gdańsk Wagon Factory). These vehicles were numbered 201-210 and were fit to pull passenger wagons. Incrementally, vehicles were introduced from occupied countries. During a Soviet assault in 1945, the trolleybuses were used as barricades.

=== Post-war crisis ===
After the Second World War, the group of people who decided to rebuild the trolleybus network contained only a small number of professionals who had previously worked in the trolleybus industry. A significant number of them had never seen a trolleybus before, qualified only by their good will and motivation to work. An action to take the trolleybus wreckage from the streets to the depot near ulica Derdowskiego commenced. The electrical substations at Redłowo, Dworzec and Grabówek, which powered the previous trolleybus network, were secured from further destruction. After the trolleybus wreckage was moved to the depot, repair work began.

=== Reactivation of the lines ===
On 19 March 1946, the trolleybus line from the depot near ulica Derdowskiego to the city offices was opened, and a loop was established. The line was serviced by three repaired Henschel vehicles. The next stage of the repair consisted of expanding the network to Orłowo for line 11. Besides the salvaged vehicles, one Büssing and three Henschel 01 vehicles were taken from MZK Olsztyn for usage in Gdynia.

On 2 October 1946, a trolleybus line from plac Kaszubski to Chylonia was opened. An electrical substation was also opened in Grabówek at a power of 720 kW. At the end of 1947, the Wydział Trolejbusowy (Department of Trolleybuses) had 24 vehicles and 3 trailers. This allowed the extension of the Orłowo line to Sopot. In 1949, MPK Wrocław gave Gdynia 8 Tallero trolleybuses that were abandoned by Germans and not activated. These trolleybuses were repaired and entered service in 1950, numbered 230-237, servicing the line to Sopot and Chylonia. On 22 August 1949, a new trolleybus line to Mały Kack was established, numbered 23. This line was serviced by 13 French Vétra vehicles, numbered 300-312. On 29 October 1949, a new line numbered 24 was opened to Oksywie, with a loop by Dowództwo Marynarki Wojennej. On 5 November 1950, the line to Chylonia was expanded to Cisowa as line 25.

5 trolleybus lines were active by the end of 1953.

On 23 May 1964, line 24 acquired an expansion, numbered 28, consisting of a branching from ulica Bosmańska in Obłuże through Oksywie to the loop by Dowództwo Marynarki Wojennej. There were two types of trolleybuses on this line. The first type, indicated by a regular number 28, ran from ulica Śmidowicza through ulica Arciszewskich to Oksywie and returned via ulica Bosmańska. The second type, indicated by a 28 with a green strikethrough, ran the opposite direction, through ulica Bosmańska to Oksywie, returning via ulica Arciszewskich. These lines were one-directional, so a passing loop was established in Oksywie. The line 24 loop was moved to near the Gdynia Port Oksywie railway station.

=== Partial elimination of lines ===
At the end of the 1960s, many Polish cities had eliminated their trolleybus networks in favour of bus networks. The main reason for this was low oil prices compared to electricity prices. During this time, the line to Oksywie and Stocznia was eliminated.

At the end of 1970, MGK had 99 trolleybuses. In this year, 35,990,000 passengers were transported by the trolleybus network.

From 1971, there was a lack of new trolleybuses, caused partially by failure to renew contracts with Czechoslovakia.

As a result of the lack of necessary new deliveries, the Wojewódzkie Przedsiębiorstwo Komunikacyjne Gdynia-Gdańsk (WPKGG) proposed the development of a prototype for a national trolleybus based upon the Jelcz-Berliet PR110U bus with electrical equipment by ELTA in Łódź and traction motors by Škoda. However, this proposal did not capture enough interest, and the import of Soviet trolleybuses was proposed.

In 1974, 4 trolleybus lines functioned. For comparison, 10 lines functioned in 1970.

=== Prototypes ===
From 1974 to 1976, cooperation was established among the Polish Federation of Engineering Associations, WPKGG, and Jelczański Zakład Samochodowy, leading to the development of two trolleybus prototypes based upon the Jelcz PR110U. The assembly of the electrical equipment was conducted by WPKGG. Škoda trolleybus engines were used as well as elements of the Konstal 105N tram. In October 1975, WPK acquired the first two ZiU-9 Soviet trolleybuses, which were immediately entered into service. On 30 October 1976, 20 more ZiU-9 trolleybuses were delivered.

=== Expansion ===
In 1977, the network of overhead wires was improved by rebuilding the intersection of ulica Świętojańska and ulica 10 Lutego, thereby reducing failures in traffic. Additionally, a section of new wires was built from ulica Jana z Kolna to plac Konstytucji, returning via ulica Migały. Preparations were made to expand line 23 to Stocznia. It was also decided to maintain and modernise the wires along ulica Wielkopolska, with an expansion to Wielki Kack. In 1975-1979, the trolleybus network returned to full operation in Gdynia. In 1980, production began for trolleybuses with electrical equipment by Berliet. The three trolleybuses produced acquired the numbers 10104 to 10106.

At the end of 1980, the Miejski Zakład Komunikacji w Gdyni (MZK) had 66 trolleybuses.

In 1981, trolleybus production continued, producing 13 trolleybuses, numbered 10107-10119. In April 1982, production of 20 trolleybuses was completed, with the final 4 trolleybuses numbered 10120-10123.

At the end of 1988, MZK had 94 trolleybuses.

=== New company ===
In the 1990s, after the transition to a free market economy, MZK began to encounter financial problems caused by vehicle aging. In 1992, a restructuring of the company commenced. In 1994, MZK was dissolved and the Przedsiębiorstwo Komunikacji Autobusowej i Trolejbusowej was formed. As a result of the implemented changes, the public opinion about the trolleybus network improved. In 1995, a loop was opened in Cisowa, overhead lines were established on ulica Owsiana, line 27 was created, and lines 25 and 30 changed their routes. In the same year, lines 22 and 27 were expanded from Chylonia to Cisowa. In 1996, lines 22 and 30 were expanded from plac Kaszubski to plac Konstytucji. Line 24 was expanded to Stocznia and renumbered 23. In 1998, PKT was formed from the Przedsiębiorstwo Komunikacji Autobusowej i Trolejbusowej. At the time of the creation of PKT, the public opinion of the trolleybus network was poor, mainly because of the organisation of traffic in the city. Old technical equipment caused many failures and interruptions to service. PKT began the process of replacing older vehicles and modernising the network, which eliminated many of the previous problems. In 2001, a loop was established near Węzeł Cegielskiej.

=== Poland in the European Union ===
With Poland in the European Union, it became possible to receive funds for rebuilding and modernising the trolleybus network or to purchase more vehicles. These funds were allocated to the construction of a new depot in Leszczynki (opened on 28 April 2007), building of overhead lines in Dąbrowa (opened on 19 December 2005) and Kacze Buki (opened on 7 August 2006), and purchase of 11 low-floored Solaris Trollino 12AC trolleybuses.

== Fleet ==
As of 2025, the fleet totaled 105 trolleybuses. Out of these:

- 87 are Solaris Trollino 12 rigid trolleybuses, and
- 18 are Solaris Trollino 18 M articulated trolleybuses.

== Trolleybus depots ==
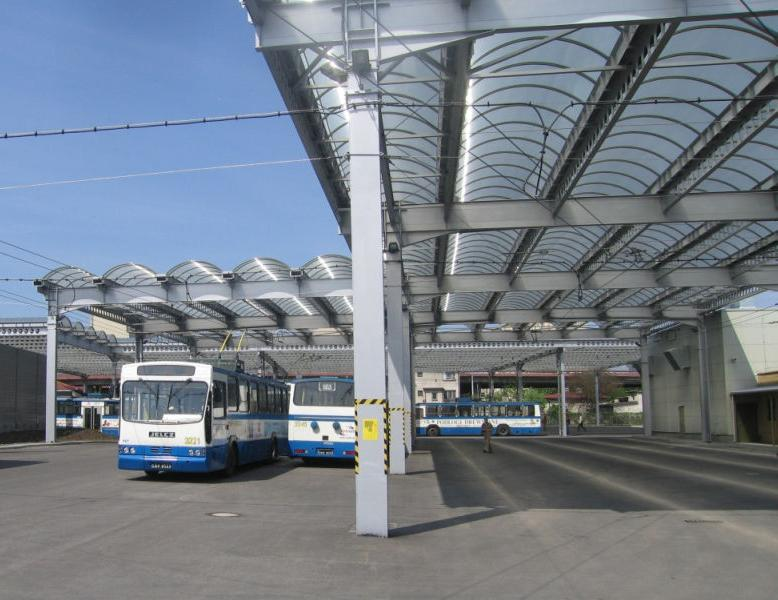
New trolleybus depot

Śródmieście
The first trolleybus lines used the depot near ulica Derdowskiego. It was closed 2 years after the end of military operations in 1945.
Redłowo
The depot by aleja Zwycięstwa was built at the end of the 1930s. From 1939 to 1945, it serviced airplane repairs. In September 1947, it was conferred to MZKGG, and all the trolleybus workshops were moved there. After the depot was removed from service, it was replaced with the Pomorski Park Naukowo-Technologiczny.
Leszczynki
On 28 April 2007, the depot by ulica Zakręt to Oksywie was opened. It contains a large area with a roof for 90 trolleybuses, two rails for daily servicing of vehicles, and a modern washing area. Most stations are fitted for the servicing of vehicles with electrical equipment on the roof. The back of the area contains a paintshop equipped with special filters to prevent atmospheric pollution.

== Infrastructure ==
=== Substations ===
Północna
The northern substation was intended to replace the Cisowa substation, but construction delays only allowed it to be constructed in 1992 to 1993. It contains two rectifiers powered at 1200 kW. The substation powers the network in Chylonia, Cisowa, and Pustki Cisowskie.
Grabówek
The substation in Grabówek was activated in 1943. It was connected to the Dworzec substation with a cable of direct current, which allowed for reserve power to be supplied in case of a failure. After being destroyed during the Second World War, it was rebuilt by the end of 1948. It contains a rectifier for 1000 A electricity. A renovation in the late 1950s increased the power of the substation to 1637 kW. In 1964, the substation was renovated again due to renovation of the network in Oksywie, and the power was increased to 2400 kW. As a result of its high power, this substation was the most important in Gdynia; it powered ulica Czerwonych Kosynierów, Chylonia, Oksywie, and Obłuże. It powers the lines on ulica Morska from Dworzec PKP to the intersection with ulica Chylońska.
Dworzec
The substation by the railway station was activated on 18 September 1943 at a power of 720 kW. It was renovated in 1959, increasing the power to 1637 kW. It powers the lines between Wzgórze Św. Maksymiliana and the beginning of ulica Morska.
Redłowo
The substation in Redłowo was created in 1943-1944 along with the construction of the line to Orłowo with a power of 720 kW. It was destroyed in the Second World War and rebuilt in 1947. A renovation in 1969 increased the power of the substation to 2400 kW. The substation powers the lines between Wzgórze Św. Maksymiliana and Mały Kack.
Karwiny
The substation in Karwiny was activated in 1989 along with construction of lines towards Karwiny. It is equipped with two rectifier stations and double-sided powering equipment.
Sopot
The substation in Sopot was created in 1948-1949 with a power of 648 kW. During its first years, the substation in Sopot powered the lines between central Sopot and Orłowo. In 1960, the Sopot substation began powering the northern portion of the Sopot line. A renovation in 1960 increased the power to 1664 kW. The Sopot substation is the smallest substation in the Gdynia trolleybus network.

=== Overhead lines ===
Due to the elongated shape of the city and the terrain conditions, the trolleybus network was planned along main streets. The network is powered with overhead lines because most of the network is located on wide, bi-directional streets. The overhead lines are supported with lateral suspension lines or extension arms. From 1998, the overhead lines began to be overhauled with modern suspension lines produced by the Czech company Elektroline. Almost 80% of overhead line intersections and junctions were replaced with new parts. These new parts allow trolleybuses to use greater speeds. Additionally, 32 sectional isolators and two sectional disconnectors were installed.

== Lines ==
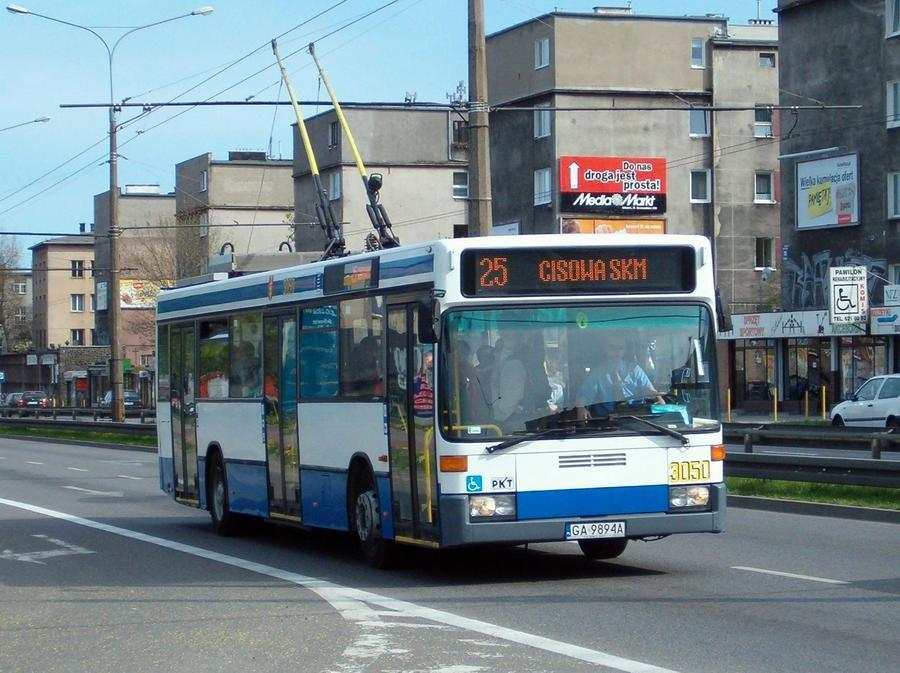
A Mercedes-Benz O405 trolleybus in Gdynia

12 regular trolleybus lines serve Gdynia, including two to Sopot. Furthermore, there is one access line from various parts of the city to the Grabówek depot and one access line to the loop by Stocznia. The regular lines are numbered with two digits, starting at number 20, with the only exception being line 181 - former bus line reclaimed by trolleybuses. The access lines are numbered with three digits, the initial digit being 7.

=== Regular lines ===
Number	Route
21	Gdynia Dworzec Główny PKP – pl. Konstytucji – 10 Lutego – Świętojańska – Władysława IV (not on return) – Zwycięstwa – (Sopot) Niepodległości – Sopot Reja and return
22	Gdynia Dworzec Główny PKP – pl. Konstytucji – Wójta Radtkego (return: Jana z Kolna) – Świętojańska – Władysława IV (return: Śląska) – Warszawska – Morska – Chylońska – Janowska – Cisowa SKM and return
23	Gdynia Dworzec Główny PKP – (every other circuit to: Stocznia Gdynia) – pl. Konstytucji – Wójta Radtkego (return: Jana z Kolna) – Świętojańska – Władysława IV (not on return) – Zwycięstwa – Wielkopolska – Chwaszczyńska – Nowowiczlińska – Rdestowa – Krzemowa – Starochwaszczyńska – Kacze Buki and return
24	Stocznia Gdynia – (every other circuit to: Gdynia Dworzec Główny PKP) – Solidarności – pl. Konstytucji (not on return) – Wójta Radtkego (return: Jana z Kolna) – Świętojańska – Władysława IV (not on return) – Zwycięstwa – Wielkopolska – Chwaszczyńska – Nowowiczlińska – Miętowa – Dąbrowa Miętowa and return
25	3 Maja – Hala – Wójta Radtkego – (return: Jana z Kolna) – Świętojańska – 10 Lutego – Morska – Chylońska – Janowska – Cisowa SKM and return
26	Orłowo SKM – "Klif" – Zwycięstwa – Władysława IV (return: Śląska) – Warszawska – Morska – Cisowa Sibeliusa and return
27	Kacze Buki – Starochwaszczyńska – Krzemowa – Rdestowa – Nowowiczlińska – Chwaszczyńska – Wielkopolska – Zwycięstwa – Stryjska – Łużycka – (return: Sportowa) – Górskiego – Droga Gdyńska (return: Śląska) – Warszawska – Morska – Chylońska – Janowska – Cisowa SKM and return
28	Redłowo Szpital – Powstania Styczniowego – Legionów – (return: Redłowska) – Zwycięstwa – Władysława IV – 10 Lutego – Morska – Chylońska – pl. Dworcowy (not on return) – Kartuska – Jaskółcza – Chabrowa – Pustki Cisowskie and return
29	Gdynia Dworzec Główny PKP – pl. Konstytucji – 10 Lutego – Świętojańska – Władysława IV (not on return) – Zwycięstwa – Wielkopolska – Chwaszczyńska – Gryfa Pomorskiego – Wielki Kack Fikakowo and return
30	3 Maja – Hala – Wójta Radtkego – (return: Jana z Kolna) – Świętojańska – 10 Lutego – Morska – Kartuska – Jaskółcza – Chabrowa – Pustki Cisowskie and return
31	Dąbrowa Miętowa – (every other circuit to: Kacze Buki) – Miętowa – Nowowiczlińska – Chwaszczyńska – Wielkopolska – Zwycięstwa – (Sopot) Niepodległości – (Sopot) 3 Maja – (Sopot) Władysława IV – (Sopot) Władysława Łokietka – (Gdańsk) Plac Dwóch Miast – Sopot Ergo Arena and return
32	Mały Kack Strzelców – Strzelców – Wielkopolska – Zwycięstwa – Świętojańska – Jana z Kolna (return: Wójta Radtkego) – Janka Wiśniewskiego – Estakada Kwiatkowskiego – Unruga – Złota – Pogórze Dolne Złota and return
33	Gdynia Dworzec Główny PKP – (every other circuit to: Stocznia Gdynia) – pl. Konstytucji – Wójta Radtkego (return: Jana z Kolna) – Świętojańska – Władysława IV (not on return) – Zwycięstwa – Wielkopolska – Chwaszczyńska – (return: Brzechwy) – Makuszyńskiego – Karwiny Tuwima and return
34	3 Maja – Hala – Wójta Radtkego – (return: Jana z Kolna) – Świętojańska – 10 Lutego – Morska – Kartuska – Skarbka – Demptowo and return
181	Kacze Buki – Starochwaszczyńska – Krzemowa – Rdestowa – Nowowiczlińska – Chwaszczyńska – Wielkopolska – Sopocka – (Sopot) Malczewskiego – (Sopot) al. Niepodległości – Sopot Reja

=== Access lines ===
Number	Route
710	Kacze Buki – Starochwaszczyńska – Chwaszczyńska – Rdestowa – Nowowiczlińska – Chwaszczyńska – Wielkopolska – al. Zwycięstwa – Świętojańska – 10 Lutego – Podjazd – Morska – Zakręt do Oksywia – Grabówek SKM
710	Cisowa SKM – Chylońska – Morska – Zakręt do Oksywia – Grabówek SKM
710	Cisowa SKM – Owsiana – Morska – Zakręt do Oksywia – Grabówek SKM
710	Dąbrowa Miętowa – Miętowa – Nowowiczlińska – Chwaszczyńska – Wielkopolska – al. Zwycięstwa – Świętojańska – 10 Lutego – Podjazd – Morska – Zakręt do Oksywia – Grabówek SKM
710	Cisowa Sibeliusa – Morska – Zakręt do Oksywia – Grabówek SKM
710	3 Maja – Hala – Wójta Radtkego – plac Kaszubski – Świętojańska – 10 Lutego – Podjazd – Morska – Zakręt do Oksywia – Grabówek SKM
710	Gdynia Dworzec Gł. PKP – pl. Konstytucji – Wójta Radtkiego – plac Kaszubski – Świętojańska – 10 Lutego – Podjazd – Morska – Zakręt do Oksywia – Grabówek SKM
710	Sopot Reja – al. Niepodległości – (Gdynia) al. Zwycięstwa – Świętojańska – 10 Lutego – Podjazd – Morska – Zakręt do Oksywia – Grabówek SKM
710	Pustki Cisowskie – Chabrowa – Jaskółcza – Kartuska – Chylońska – Morska – Zakręt do Oksywia – Grabówek SKM
710	Orłowo SKM – Klif – al. Zwycięstwa – Świętojańska – 10 Lutego – Podjazd – Morska – Zakręt do Oksywia – Grabówek SKM
710	Stocznia Gdynia – al. Solidarności – Węzeł Ofiar Grudnia ’70 – Janka Wiśniewskiego – pl. Konstytucji – Wójta Radtkego – plac Kaszubski – Świętojańska – 10 Lutego – Podjazd – Morska – Zakręt do Oksywia – Grabówek SKM
723	Morska – Estakada – Morska – Podjazd – 10 Lutego – Świętojańska – plac Kaszubski – Jana z Kolna – Janka Wiśniewskiego – Węzeł Ofiar Grudnia 70 – al. Solidarności – Stocznia Gdynia
