= Olszewko =

Olszewko may refer to the following places:

- Olszewko, Masovian Voivodeship (east-central Poland)
- Olszewko, Kartuzy County in Pomeranian Voivodeship (north Poland)
- Olszewko, Słupsk County in Pomeranian Voivodeship (north Poland)
- Olszewko, Warmian-Masurian Voivodeship (north Poland)
