= Gdynia Obłuże railway station =

Railway station in Gdynia, Poland

Coordinates: 54°32′46″N 18°31′12″E

Gdynia Obłuże
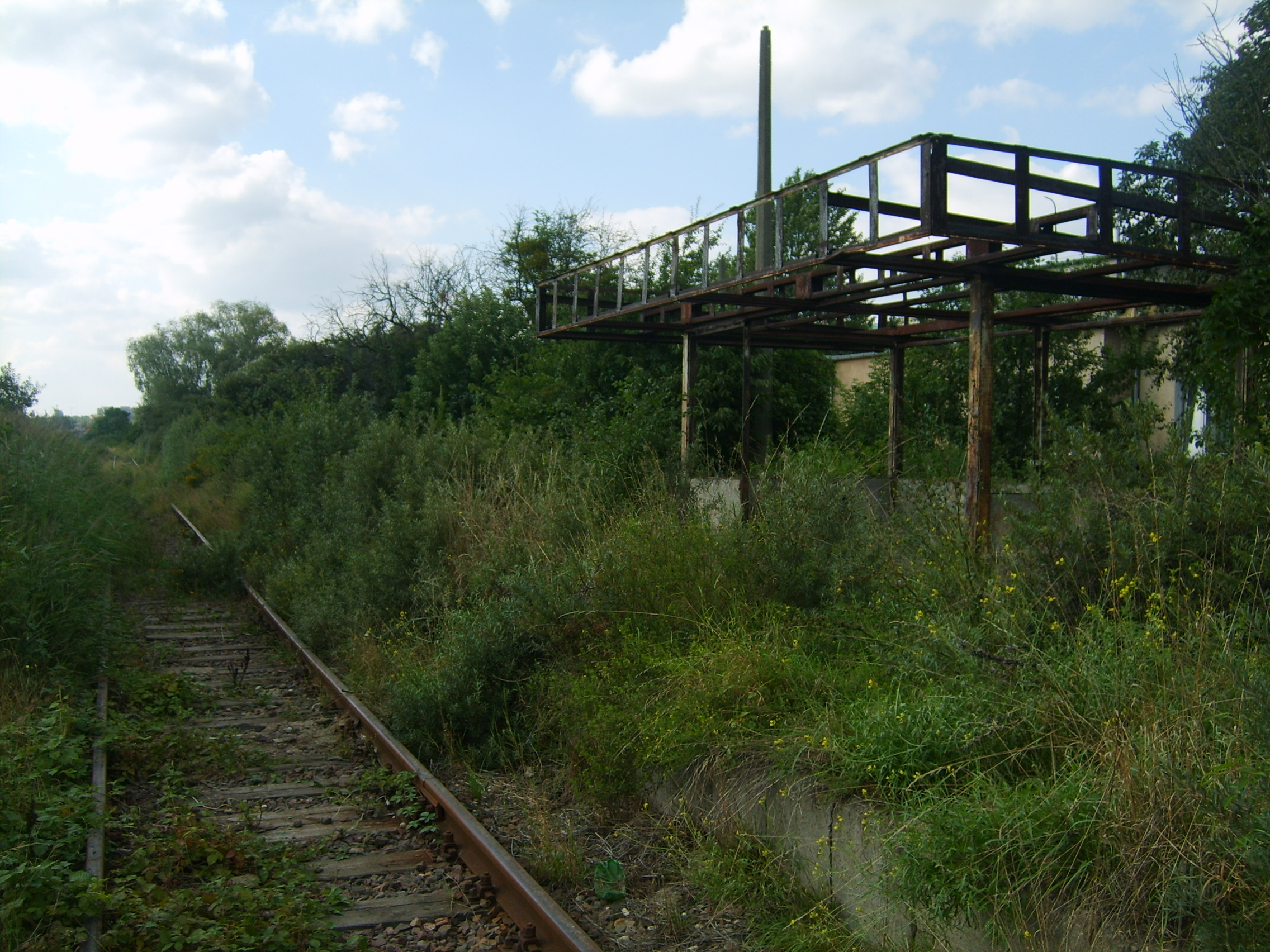

General information
- Location: Obłuże, Gdynia; Poland
- Owner: Polskie Koleje Państwowe S.A.
- Platforms: None

Construction
- Structure type: Building: No; Depot: Never existed Water tower: Never existed
Location

Gdynia Obłuże is a no longer operational PKP freight railway station in Gdynia (Pomeranian Voivodeship), Poland.

== Lines crossing the station ==
Start station	End station	Line type
Rumia	Gdynia Port Oksywie	Freight
