= Kazimierz Kleina =

Polish politician (born 1958)

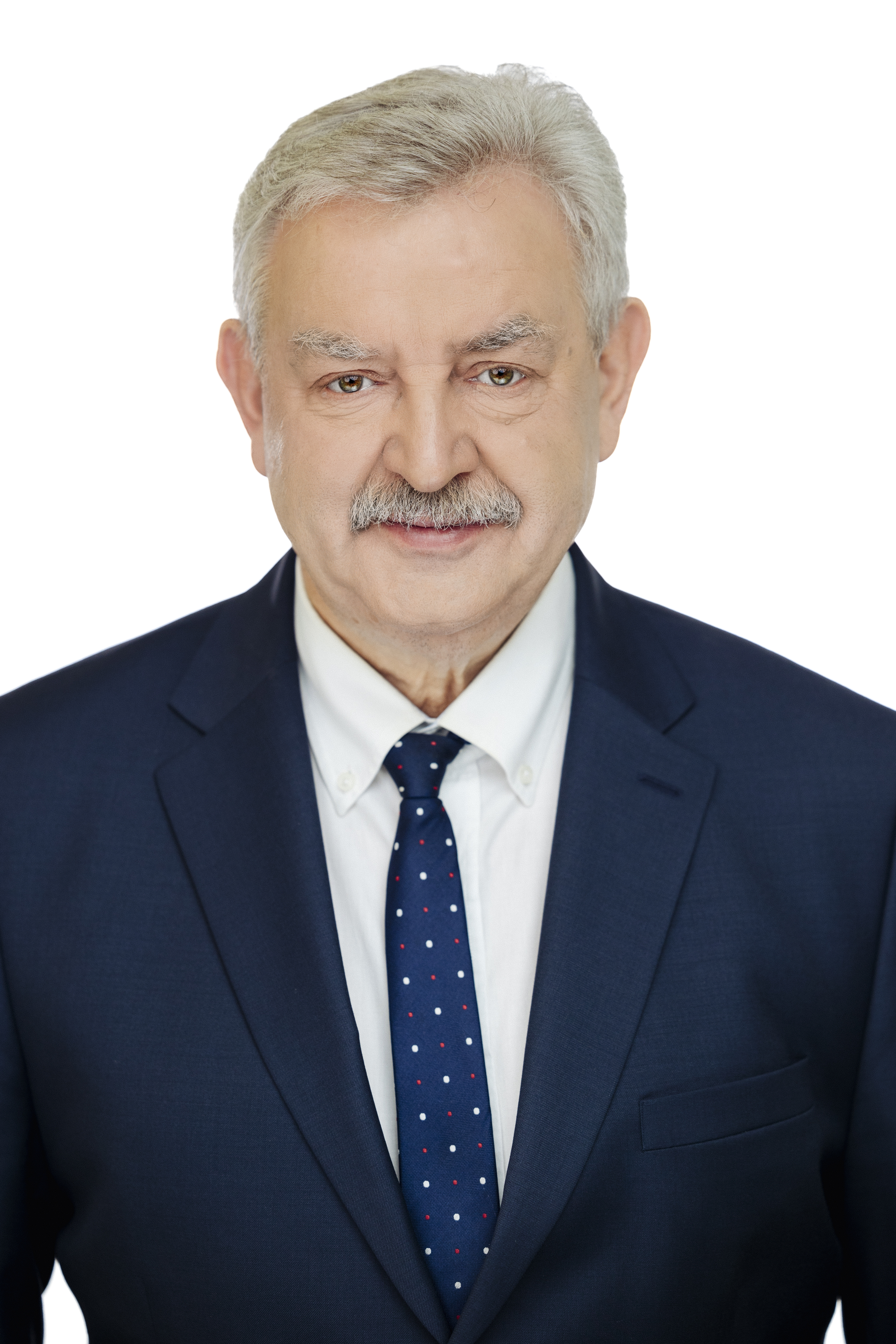

Member of the Senate
- Incumbent
- Assumed office 2007

Personal details
- Born: 21 February 1958 (age 68)
- Party: Civic Platform

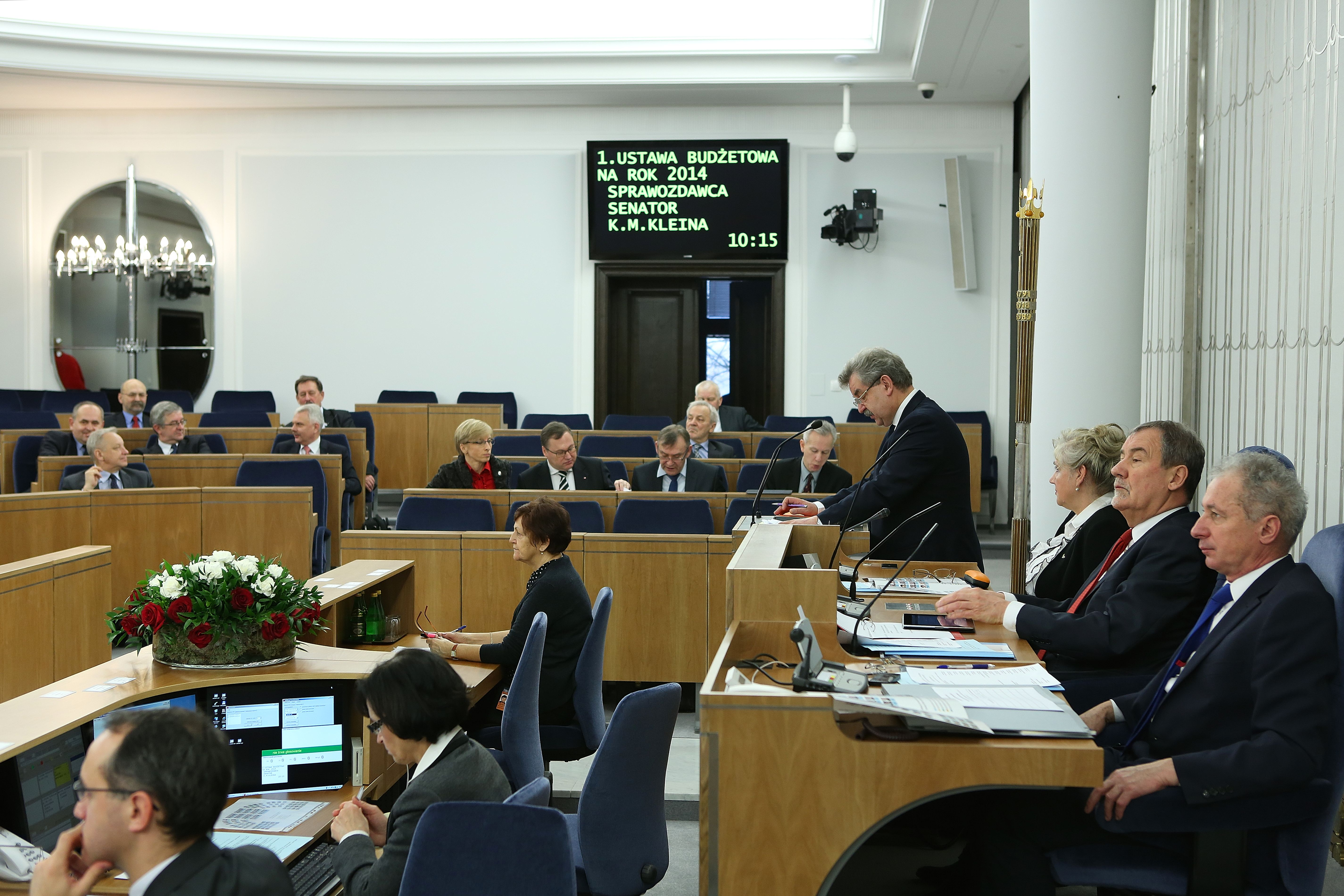

Kazimierz Mariusz Kleina (born 21 February 1958 in Sierakowice) is a Polish politician. He was elected to the Sejm on 25 September 2005, getting 7896 votes in the 26th Gdynia district as a candidate from the Civic Platform list.

He was also a member of the Senate 1997-2001 and has been a member since 2007.

Kazimierz Kleina was born in Sierakowice, Pomeranian Voivodeship, Kashubia. He graduated from the University of Gdańsk with a degree in transport economics. Kleina worked as a teacher in Żukowo. He speaks fluent Kashubian.

== Bibliography ==
- J. Borzyszkowski, D. Albrecht (red.): Pomorze - mała ojczyzna Kaszubów. Historia i współczesność. Kaschubisch-Pommersche Heimat. Geschichte und Gegenwart, Gdańsk-Lubeka 2000, p. 494 (German/Polish)
