= Poljanska =

Poljanska may refer to:

- Poljańska, a village in Poland
- Poljanska, Croatia, a village near Velika, Croatia
