= Gdynia Pogórze railway station =

Railway station in Gdynia, Poland

Coordinates: 54°33′15″N 18°29′12″E

Gdynia Pogórze
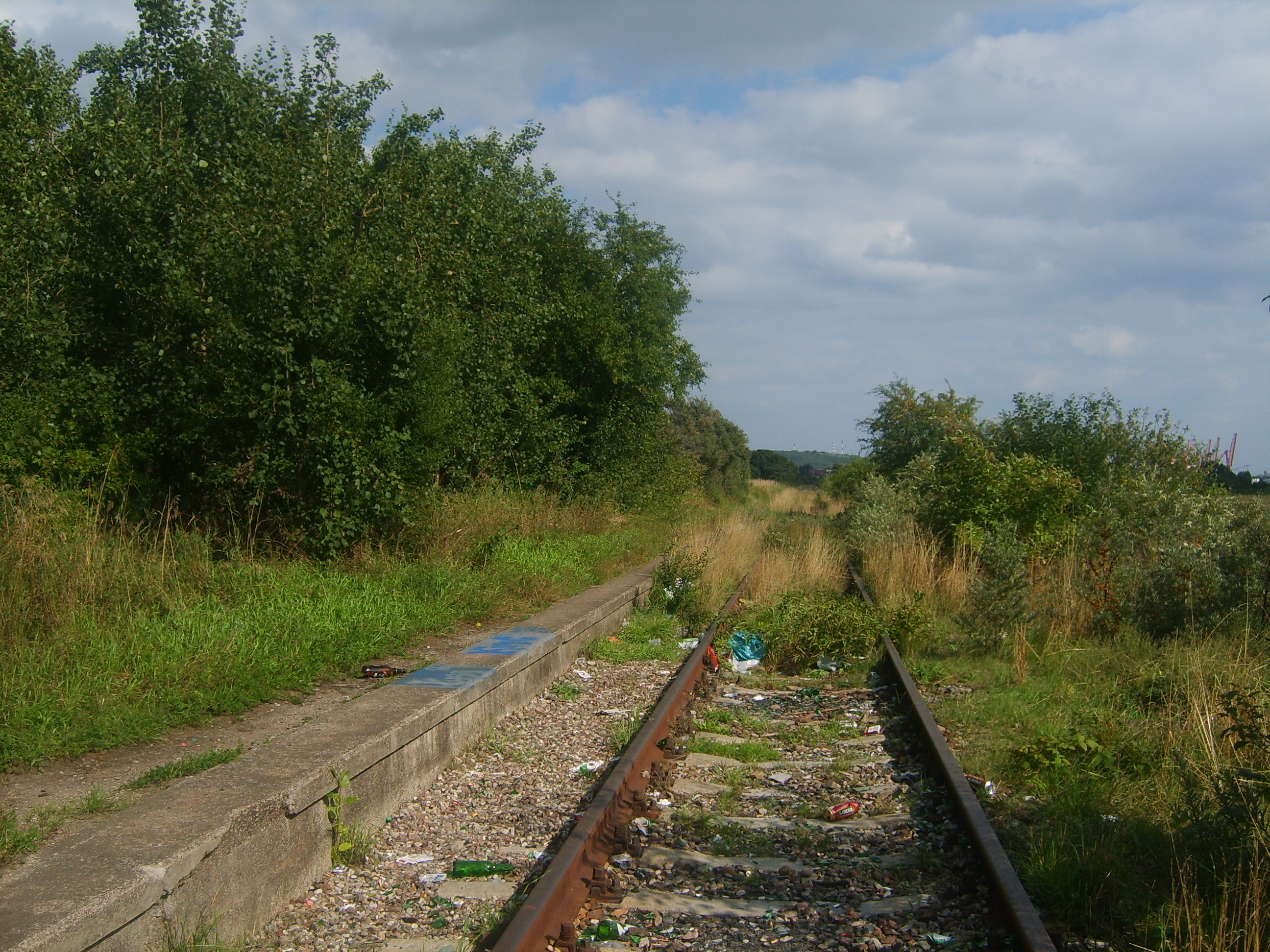

General information
- Location: Pogórze, Gdynia; Poland
- Owner: Polskie Koleje Państwowe S.A.
- Platforms: None

Construction
- Structure type: Building: Yes; Depot: Never existed Water tower: Never existed
Location

Gdynia Pogórze is a PKP freight railway station in Gdynia (Pomeranian Voivodeship), Poland.

== Lines crossing the station ==
Start station	End station	Line type
Rumia	Gdynia Port Oksywie	Freight
