= Lemany =

Lemany may refer to the following places:

- Lemany, Masovian Voivodeship (east-central Poland)
- Lemany, Pomeranian Voivodeship (north Poland)
- Lemany, Warmian-Masurian Voivodeship (north Poland)
