= Mojusz railway station =

Railway station in Poland

Mojusz

General information
- Location: Mojusz; Poland
- Coordinates: 54.337492°N 17.977824°E
- Owner: Polskie Koleje Państwowe S.A.

Construction
- Structure type: Building: None; Depot: Never existed Water tower: Never existed

History
- Former names: Mooswalde until 1945
Location

Mojusz is a non-operational PKP railway station in Mojusz (Pomeranian Voivodeship), Poland.

== Lines crossing the station ==
Start station	End station	Line type
Pruszcz Gdański	Łeba	Closed
