= Welk =

Welk or WELK may also refer to:

== People ==
- Ehm Welk (1884–1966), German writer
- Lawrence Welk (1903–1992), American musician

== Other uses ==
- Welk, Pomeranian Voivodeship, a village in Poland
- WELK, a radio station in West Virginia, United States

== See also ==
- Whelk, a sea snail
