= Kamienica Królewska railway station =

Railway station in Poland

Kamienica Królewska
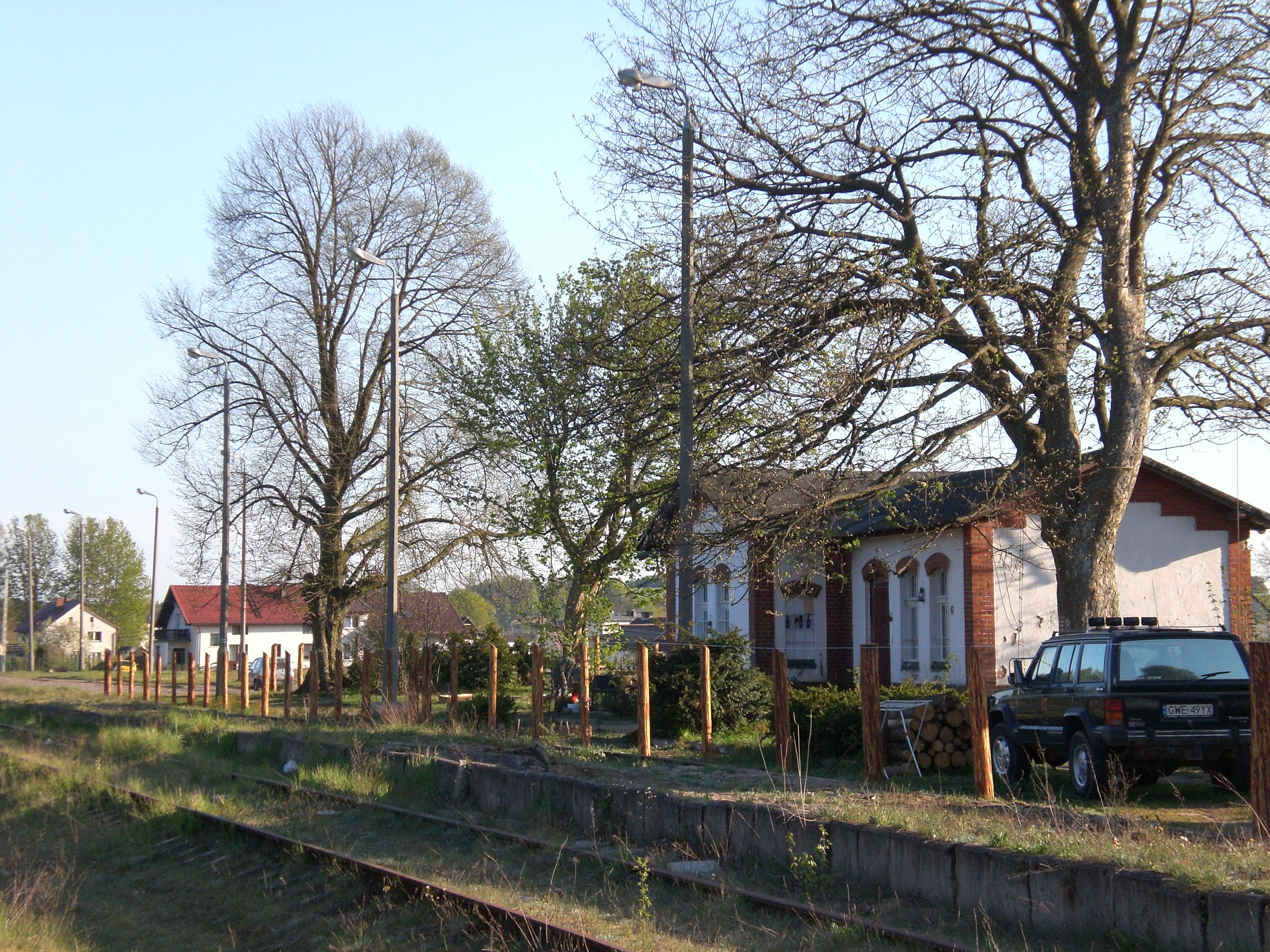

General information
- Location: Kamienica Królewska; Poland
- Coordinates: 54.4°N 17.9°E
- Owner: Polskie Koleje Państwowe S.A.
- Platforms: 1

Construction
- Structure type: Building: Yes (no longer used); Depot: Never existed Water tower: Never existed

History
- Former names: Sierke until 1945
Location
- Location within Pomeranian Voivodeship Location within Poland

Kamienica Królewska is a non-operational PKP railway station in Kamienica Królewska (Pomeranian Voivodeship), Poland.

== Lines crossing the station ==
Start station	End station	Line type
Pruszcz Gdański	Łeba	Dismantled
