= Łyśniewo Sierakowickie =

- Village
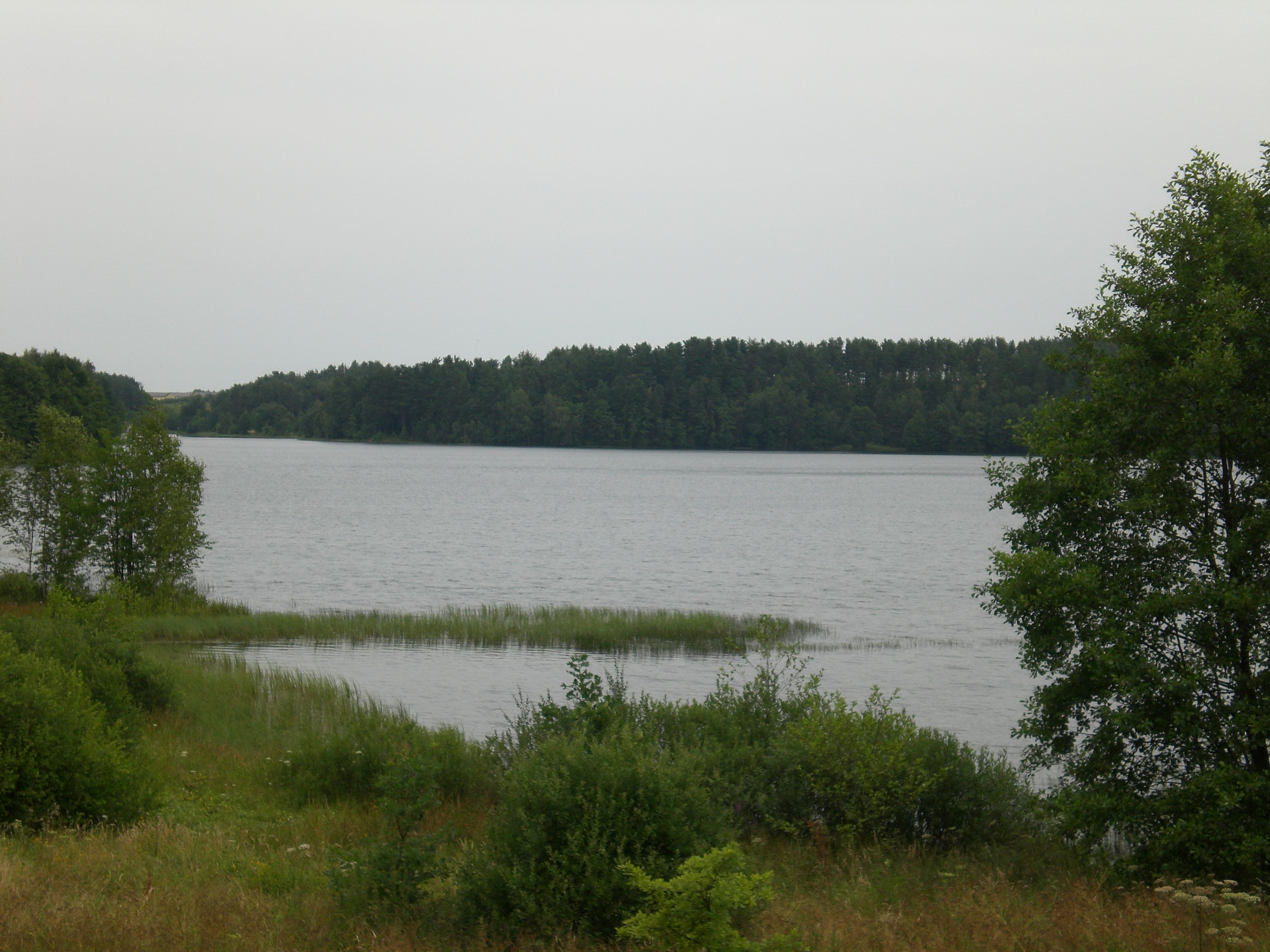
- Lake Długie in Łyśniewo Sierakowickie

- Location within Poland
- Coordinates: 54°21′18″N 17°50′15″E
- Country: Poland
- Voivodeship: Pomeranian
- County: Kartuzy
- Gmina: Sierakowice
- Population: 542
- Time zone: UTC+1 (CET)
  - Summer (DST): UTC+2 (CEST)
- Vehicle registration: GKA

Łyśniewo Sierakowickie [wɨɕˈɲɛvɔ ɕɛrakɔˈvit͡skʲɛ] is a village in the administrative district of Gmina Sierakowice, within Kartuzy County, Pomeranian Voivodeship, in northern Poland.

It is located between the Miemino, Trzono and Długie lakes, within the ethnocultural region of Kashubia in the historic region of Pomerania.

== History ==
Łyśniewo was a royal village of the Kingdom of Poland, administratively located in the Mirachowo County in the Pomeranian Voivodeship.

During the German occupation of Poland (World War II), in 1939, some Poles from Łyśniewo Sierakowickie were among the victims of a massacre committed by the Germans in nearby Kaliska as part of the genocidal Intelligenzaktion campaign. In 1944, the German police carried out expulsions of Poles, who were deported to the Potulice concentration camp, while their farms were handed over to German colonists as part of the Lebensraum policy.
