= Załakowo =

- Village
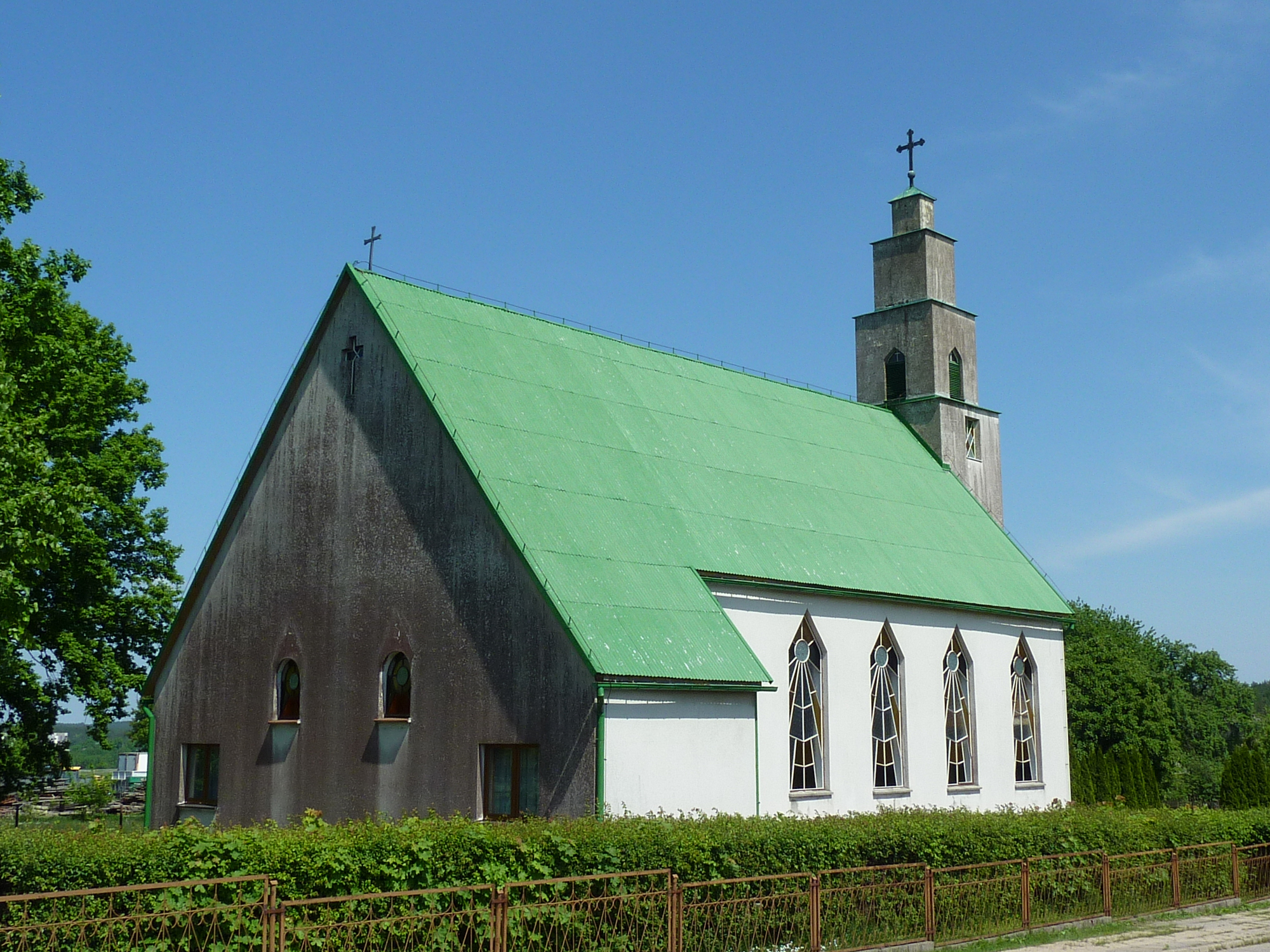
- Church of Saint Maksymilian Kolbe

- Location within Poland
- Coordinates: 54°23′N 17°51′E
- Country: Poland
- Voivodeship: Pomeranian
- County: Kartuzy
- Gmina: Sierakowice

Population
  - Total: 467

Załakowo [zawaˈkɔvɔ] is a village in the administrative district of Gmina Sierakowice, within Kartuzy County, Pomeranian Voivodeship, in northern Poland.

For details of the history of the region, see History of Pomerania.
