= Dolina Jadwigi =

Dolina Jadwigi Dolëzna Jadwidżi
- Settlement
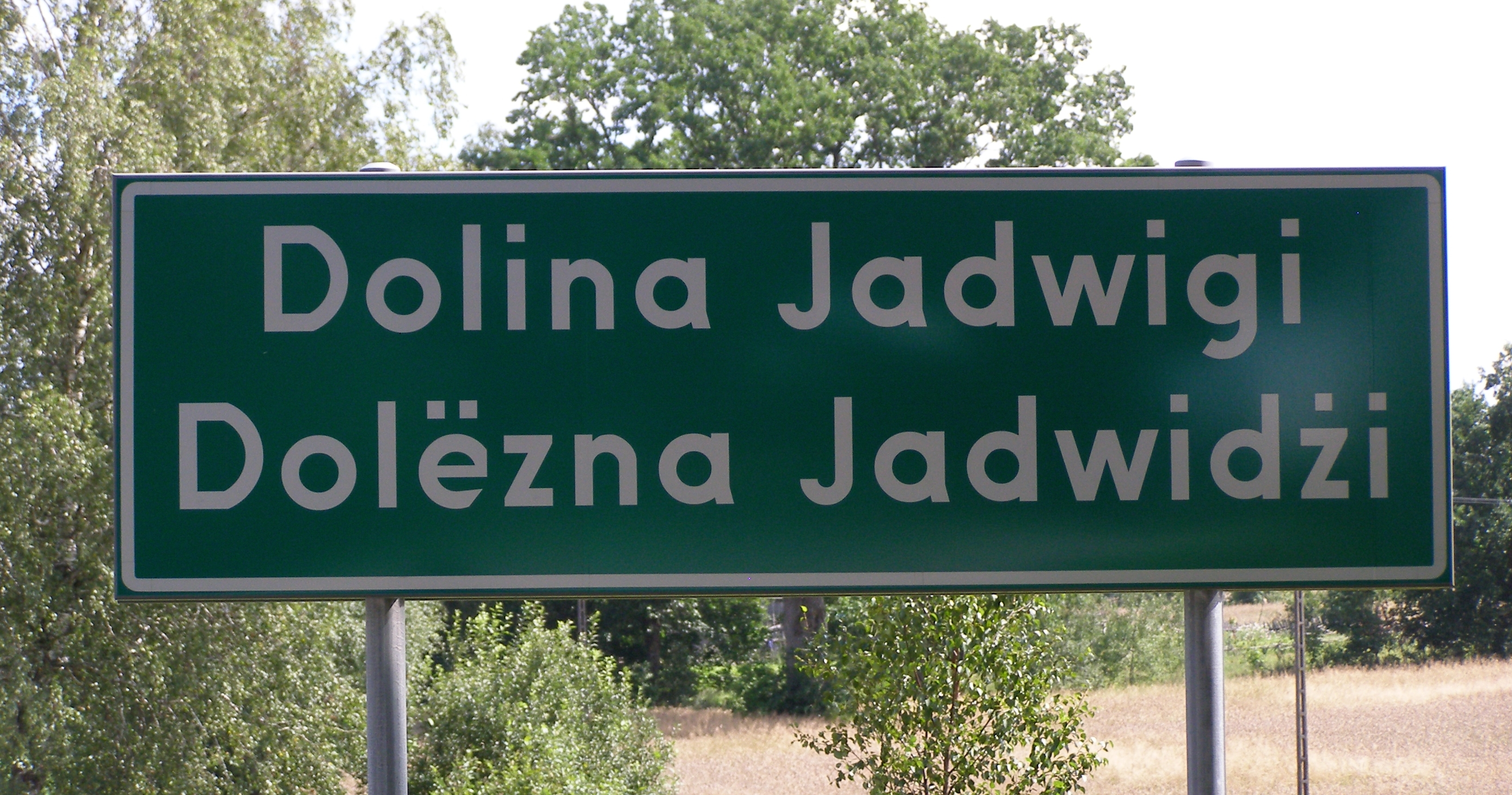

- Location within Poland
- Coordinates: 54°20′21″N 17°45′5″E
- Country: Poland
- Voivodeship: Pomeranian
- County: Kartuzy
- Gmina: Sierakowice
- Population: 24

Dolina Jadwigi ([dɔˈlina jadˈviɡi], Kashubian: Dolëzna Jadwidżi) is a settlement in the administrative district of Gmina Sierakowice, within Kartuzy County, Pomeranian Voivodeship, in northern Poland.

== See also ==
- History of Pomerania
