= Bór, Pomeranian Voivodeship =

Bór
- Village
- Location within Poland
- Coordinates: 54°21′49″N 18°0′40″E
- Country: Poland
- Voivodeship: Pomeranian
- County: Kartuzy
- Gmina: Sierakowice
- Population: 35

Bór [bur] is a village in the administrative district of Gmina Sierakowice, within Kartuzy County, Pomeranian Voivodeship, in northern Poland.

For details of the history of the region, see History of Pomerania.
