= Gowidlino =

- Village
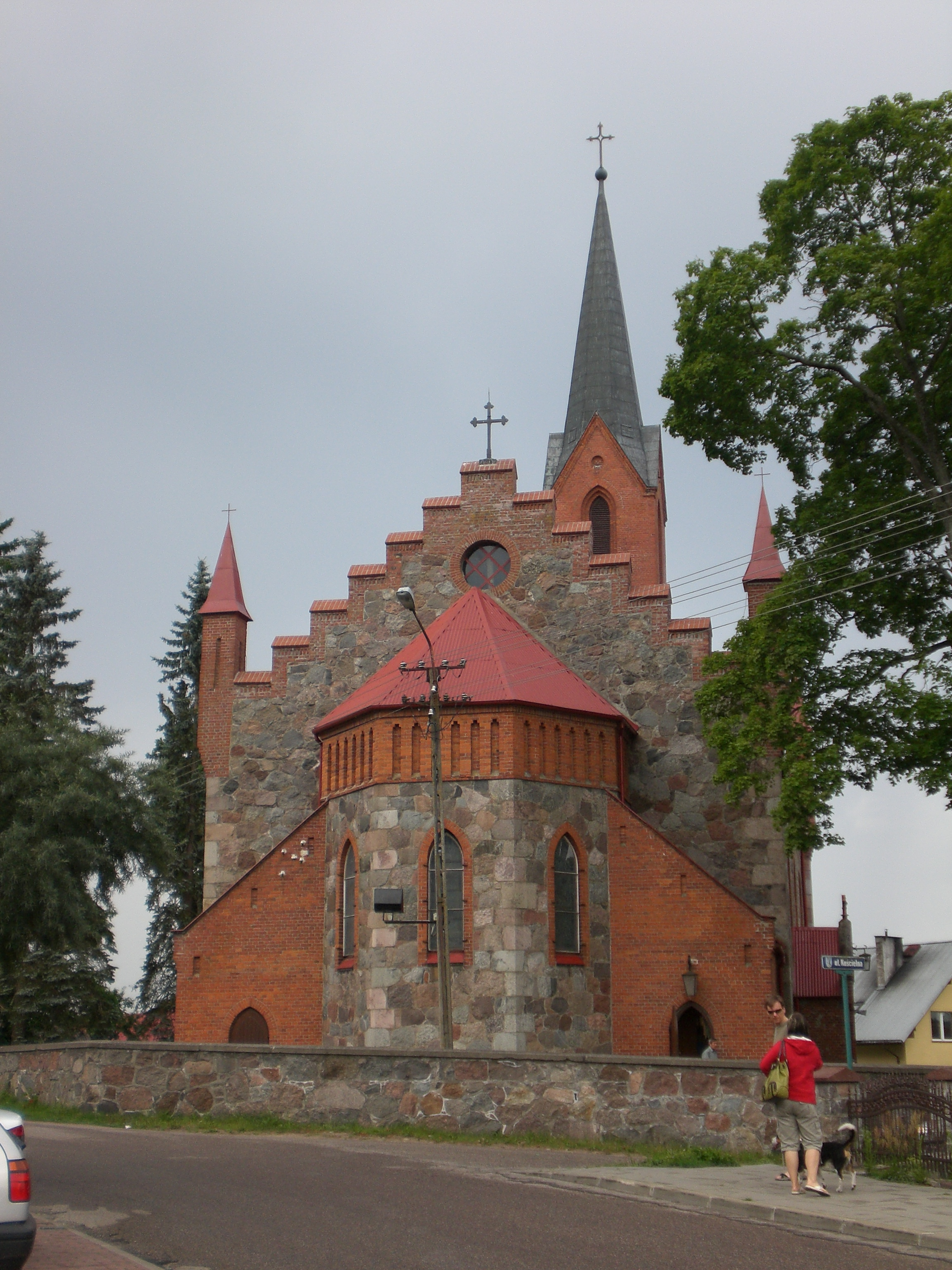
- Church of the Immaculate Conception of the Virgin Mary

- Location within Poland
- Coordinates: 54°19′31″N 17°47′26″E
- Country: Poland
- Voivodeship: Pomeranian
- County: Kartuzy
- Gmina: Sierakowice
- Elevation: 165.3 m (542 ft)

Population
  - Total: 1,350
- Time zone: UTC+1 (CET)
  - Summer (DST): UTC+2 (CEST)
- Vehicle registration: GKA

Gowidlino [ɡɔviˈdlinɔ] is a Kashubian village in the administrative district of Gmina Sierakowice, within Kartuzy County, Pomeranian Voivodeship, in northern Poland.

It is located on the northern shore of the Gowidlińskie Lake, within the ethnocultural region of Kashubia in the historic region of Pomerania.

== History ==
Gowidlino was a royal village of the Kingdom of Poland, administratively located in the Mirachowo County in the Pomeranian Voivodeship.

During the German occupation of Poland (World War II), in 1939, some Poles from Gowidlino were among the victims of a massacre committed by the Germans in nearby Kaliska as part of the Intelligenzaktion, whereas local priest Maksymilian Krzewiński was murdered during a massacre of Polish priests from the region perpetrated by the Einsatzkommando 16 in the forest near Kartuzy (see: Nazi persecution of the Catholic Church in Poland). In 1942, the German police carried out expulsions of Poles, whose farms were then handed over to Germans as part of the Lebensraum policy. Expelled Poles were deported to the Potulice concentration camp, and eventually enslaved as forced labour and sent either to Germany or to German colonists in the region.

== Notable people ==
- Danuta Stenka (born 1961), Polish actress
