= Moczydło, Kartuzy County =

Moczydło
- Village
- Location within Poland
- Coordinates: 54°19′39″N 17°51′13″E
- Country: Poland
- Voivodeship: Pomeranian
- County: Kartuzy
- Gmina: Sierakowice
- Population: 86

Moczydło [mɔˈt͡ʂɨdwɔ] is a village in the administrative district of Gmina Sierakowice, within Kartuzy County, Pomeranian Voivodeship, in northern Poland.

For details of the history of the region, see History of Pomerania.
