= Bącka Huta =

- Village
- Wayside cross in Bącka Huta

- Location within Poland
- Coordinates: 54°22′8″N 17°58′27″E
- Country: Poland
- Voivodeship: Pomeranian
- County: Kartuzy
- Gmina: Sierakowice

Population
  - Total: 261
- Time zone: UTC+1 (CET)
  - Summer (DST): UTC+2 (CEST)
- Vehicle registration: GKA

Bącka Huta [ˈbɔnt͡ska ˈxuta] is a village in the administrative district of Gmina Sierakowice, within Kartuzy County, Pomeranian Voivodeship, in northern Poland. It is located in the ethnocultural region of Kashubia in the historic region of Pomerania.

== History ==
During the German occupation of Poland (World War II), the Polish resistance printed Polish underground press in Bącka Huta.
