= Rębienica =

- Village
- Location within Poland
- Coordinates: 54°18′21″N 17°50′57″E
- Country: Poland
- Voivodeship: Pomeranian
- County: Kartuzy
- Gmina: Sierakowice

Population
  - Total: 82

Rębienica [rɛmbjɛˈnit͡sa] is a village in the administrative district of Gmina Sierakowice, within Kartuzy County, Pomeranian Voivodeship, in northern Poland.

For details of the history of the region, see History of Pomerania.
