= Kamienicki Młyn =

- Village
- Location within Poland
- Coordinates: 54°24′22″N 17°53′37″E
- Country: Poland
- Voivodeship: Pomeranian
- County: Kartuzy
- Gmina: Sierakowice
- Population: 130

Kamienicki Młyn [kamjɛˈnit͡ski ˈmwɨn] is a village in the administrative district of Gmina Sierakowice, within Kartuzy County, Pomeranian Voivodeship, in northern Poland.

For details of the history of the region, see History of Pomerania.
