= Paczewo =

- Village
- Location within Poland
- Coordinates: 54°21′53″N 17°55′24″E
- Country: Poland
- Voivodeship: Pomeranian
- County: Kartuzy
- Gmina: Sierakowice
- Elevation: 214 m (702 ft)
- Population: 464

Paczewo [paˈt͡ʂɛvɔ] is a village in the administrative district of Gmina Sierakowice, within Kartuzy County, Pomeranian Voivodeship, in northern Poland.

For details of the history of the region, see History of Pomerania.
