= Gmina Sierakowice =

Gmina Sierakowice Gmina Sërakòjce Sierakowice Commune
- Gmina
- Flag Coat of arms
- Interactive map of Gmina Sierakowice; Gmina Sërakòjce
- Coordinates (Sierakowice): 54°20′46″N 17°53′30″E
- Country: Poland
- Voivodeship: Pomeranian
- County: Kartuzy
- Seat: Sierakowice

Government
  - Mayor: Tadeusz Roman Kobiela

Area
  - Total: 182.36 km^{2} (70.41 sq mi)

Population (2006)
  - Total: 16,570
  - Density: 90.86/km^{2} (235.3/sq mi)
- Website: http://www.sierakowice.pl

Gmina Sierakowice (Kashubian: Gmina Sërakòjce) is a rural gmina (administrative district) in Kartuzy County, Pomeranian Voivodeship, in northern Poland. Its seat is the village of Sierakowice, which lies approximately 21 kilometres (13 mi) west of Kartuzy and 49 km (30 mi) west of the regional capital Gdańsk.

The gmina covers an area of 182.36 square kilometres (70.4 sq mi), and as of 2006 its total population is 16,570. It belongs to bilingual communes in Poland.

The gmina contains part of the protected area called Kashubian Landscape Park.

== Villages ==
Gmina Sierakowice contains the villages and settlements of Ameryka, Bącka Huta, Bór, Borowy Las, Bukowo, Ciechomie, Dąbrowa Puzdrowska, Długi Kierz, Dolina Jadwigi, Gowidlinko, Gowidlino, Gowidlino-Wybudowanie, Jagodowo, Janowo, Jelonko, Kamienica Królewska, Kamienicka Huta, Kamienicki Młyn, Kamionka Gowidlińska, Karczewko, Karłowo, Karwacja, Kokwino, Koryta, Kowale, Kujaty, Kukówka, Łączki, Lemany, Leszczynki, Lisie Jamy, Łyśniewo Sierakowickie, Migi, Moczydło, Mojusz, Mojuszewska Huta, Mrozy, Nowa Ameryka, Nowalczysko, Olszewko, Paczewo, Pałubice, Patoki, Piekiełko, Poljańska, Poręby, Przylesie, Puzdrowo, Puzdrowski Młyn, Rębienica, Sierakowice, Sierakowice-Wybudowanie, Sierakowska Huta, Skrzeszewo, Smolniki, Sosnowa Góra, Srocze Góry, Stara Huta, Stara Maszyna, Szklana, Szopa, Szramnica, Tuchlinek, Tuchlino, Welk, Wygoda Sierakowska, Załakowo and Zarębisko.

== Neighbouring gminas ==
Gmina Sierakowice is bordered by the gminas of Cewice, Chmielno, Czarna Dąbrówka, Kartuzy, Linia, Parchowo, Stężyca and Sulęczyno.
