= Patoki, Pomeranian Voivodeship =

Patoki
- Village
- Location within Poland
- Coordinates: 54°19′15″N 17°55′37″E
- Country: Poland
- Voivodeship: Pomeranian
- County: Kartuzy
- Gmina: Sierakowice
- Population: 80

Patoki [paˈtɔki] is a village in the administrative district of Gmina Sierakowice, within Kartuzy County, Pomeranian Voivodeship, in northern Poland.

For details of the history of the region, see History of Pomerania.
