= Gowidlino-Wybudowanie =

- Settlement
- Location within Poland
- Coordinates: 54°19′00″N 17°46′29″E
- Country: Poland
- Voivodeship: Pomeranian
- County: Kartuzy
- Gmina: Sierakowice

Gowidlino-Wybudowanie [ɡɔviˈdlinɔ vɨbudɔˈvaɲɛ] is a settlement in the administrative district of Gmina Sierakowice, within Kartuzy County, Pomeranian Voivodeship, in northern Poland.

For details of the history of the region, see History of Pomerania.
