= Szopa, Pomeranian Voivodeship =

Szopa
- Village
- Location within Poland
- Coordinates: 54°21′39″N 17°58′22″E
- Country: Poland
- Voivodeship: Pomeranian
- County: Kartuzy
- Gmina: Sierakowice
- Population: 193

Szopa [ˈʂɔpa] is a village in the administrative district of Gmina Sierakowice, within Kartuzy County, Pomeranian Voivodeship, in northern Poland. There is a small school in Szopa. Students learn three languages - English, German and Kashubian.

For details of the history of the region, see History of Pomerania.
