= Stara Maszyna =

Stara Maszyna, Kashubian: Stôrô Maszina
- Village
- Location within Poland
- Coordinates: 54°20′15″N 17°54′50″E
- Country: Poland
- Voivodeship: Pomeranian
- County: Kartuzy
- Gmina: Sierakowice
- Population: 138

Stara Maszyna [ˈstara maˈʂɨna] is a village in the administrative district of Gmina Sierakowice, within Kartuzy County, Pomeranian Voivodeship, in northern Poland. Kashubian vetch (Vicia cassubica) is native to the village.

For details of the history of the region, see History of Pomerania.
