= Łączki, Pomeranian Voivodeship =

Łączki
- Village
- Location within Poland
- Coordinates: 54°21′18″N 17°59′20″E
- Country: Poland
- Voivodeship: Pomeranian
- County: Kartuzy
- Gmina: Sierakowice
- Population: 60

Łączki [ˈwɔnt͡ʂki] is a village in the administrative district of Gmina Sierakowice, within Kartuzy County, Pomeranian Voivodeship, in northern Poland.

== History ==
The village has been a part of German Empire.
