= Koryta, Gmina Sierakowice =

Koryta
- Settlement
- Location within Poland
- Coordinates: 54°23′31″N 17°55′2″E
- Country: Poland
- Voivodeship: Pomeranian
- County: Kartuzy
- Gmina: Sierakowice

Koryta [kɔˈrɨta] is a settlement in the administrative district of Gmina Sierakowice, within Kartuzy County, Pomeranian Voivodeship, in northern Poland.

For details of the history of the region, see History of Pomerania.
