= Pałubice =

- Village
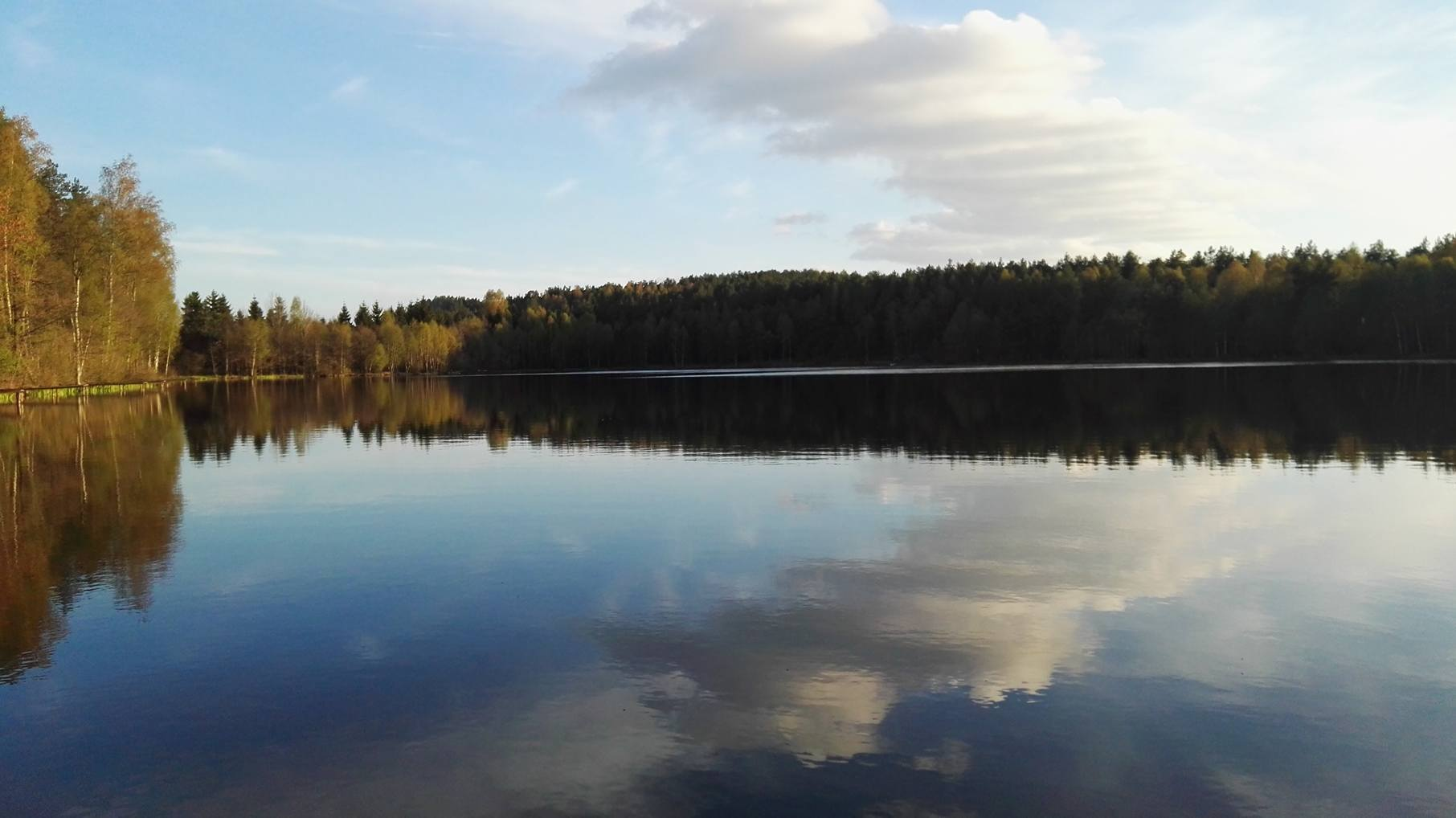
- Okonko Lake in Pałubice

- Location within Poland
- Coordinates: 54°23′22″N 17°51′33″E
- Country: Poland
- Voivodeship: Pomeranian
- County: Kartuzy
- Gmina: Sierakowice

Population
  - Total: 282

Pałubice [pawuˈbit͡sɛ] is a village in the administrative district of Gmina Sierakowice, within Kartuzy County, Pomeranian Voivodeship, in northern Poland. It is located within the ethnocultural region of Kashubia in the historic region of Pomerania.

Eight Polish citizens were murdered by Nazi Germany in the village during World War II.
