= Piekiełko, Gmina Sierakowice =

Piekiełko
- Village
- Location within Poland
- Coordinates: 54°20′28″N 17°52′50″E
- Country: Poland
- Voivodeship: Pomeranian
- County: Kartuzy
- Gmina: Sierakowice
- Population: 74

Piekiełko [pjɛˈkʲɛu̯kɔ] is a village in the administrative district of Gmina Sierakowice, within Kartuzy County, Pomeranian Voivodeship, in northern Poland.

For details of the history of the region, see History of Pomerania.
