= Skrzeszewo, Pomeranian Voivodeship =

Skrzeszewo
- Village
- Location within Poland
- Coordinates: 54°24′37″N 17°50′26″E
- Country: Poland
- Voivodeship: Pomeranian
- County: Kartuzy
- Gmina: Sierakowice
- Population: 95

Skrzeszewo [skʂɛˈʂɛvɔ] is a village in the administrative district of Gmina Sierakowice, within Kartuzy County, Pomeranian Voivodeship, in northern Poland.

Marian Majkowski was born here. For details of the history of the region, see History of Pomerania.
