= Przylesie, Pomeranian Voivodeship =

Przylesie
- Settlement
- Location within Poland
- Coordinates: 54°19′26″N 17°56′55″E
- Country: Poland
- Voivodeship: Pomeranian
- County: Kartuzy
- Gmina: Sierakowice
- Population: 15

Przylesie [pʂɨˈlɛɕɛ] is a settlement in the administrative district of Gmina Sierakowice, within Kartuzy County, Pomeranian Voivodeship, in northern Poland.

For details of the history of the region, see History of Pomerania.
