= Smolniki, Kartuzy County =

Smolniki
- Village
- Location within Poland
- Coordinates: 54°20′53″N 17°45′25″E
- Country: Poland
- Voivodeship: Pomeranian
- County: Kartuzy
- Gmina: Sierakowice
- Population: 167

Smolniki [smɔlˈniki] is a village in the administrative district of Gmina Sierakowice, within Kartuzy County, Pomeranian Voivodeship, in northern Poland.

For details of the history of the region, see History of Pomerania.
