= Puzdrowski Młyn =

- Settlement
- Location within Poland
- Coordinates: 54°20′42″N 17°50′54″E
- Country: Poland
- Voivodeship: Pomeranian
- County: Kartuzy
- Gmina: Sierakowice

Puzdrowski Młyn [puzˈdrɔfski ˈmwɨn] is a settlement in the administrative district of Gmina Sierakowice, within Kartuzy County, Pomeranian Voivodeship, in northern Poland.

For details of the history of the region, see History of Pomerania.
