= Ameryka, Kartuzy County =

Ameryka
- Settlement
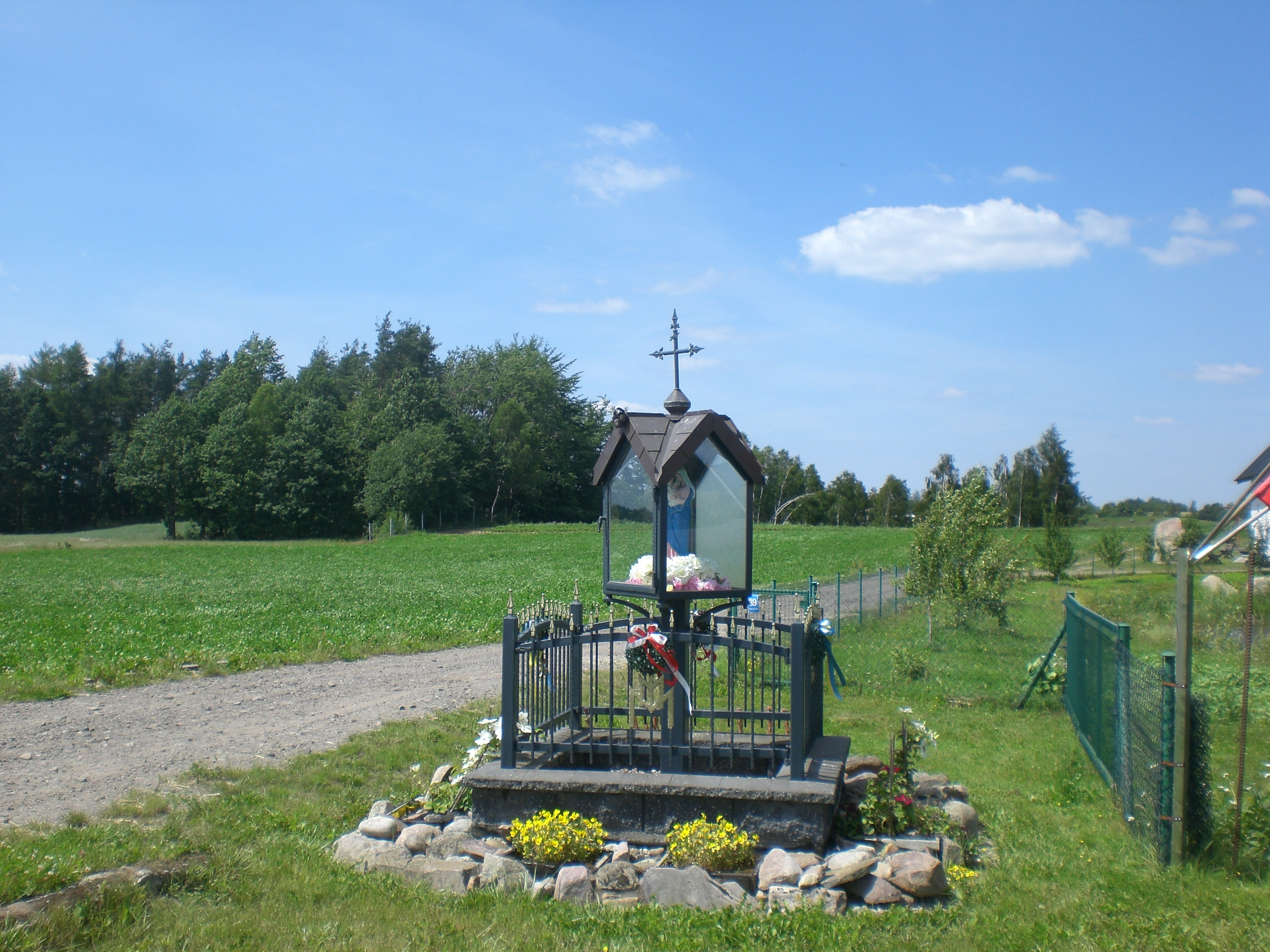

- Location within Poland
- Coordinates: 54°16′50″N 17°56′59″E
- Country: Poland
- Voivodeship: Pomeranian
- County: Kartuzy
- Gmina: Sierakowice
- Population: 9

Ameryka [amɛˈrɨka] is a settlement in the administrative district of Gmina Sierakowice, within Kartuzy County, Pomeranian Voivodeship, in northern Poland.

For details of the history of the region, see History of Pomerania.
