= Borowy Las =

- Village
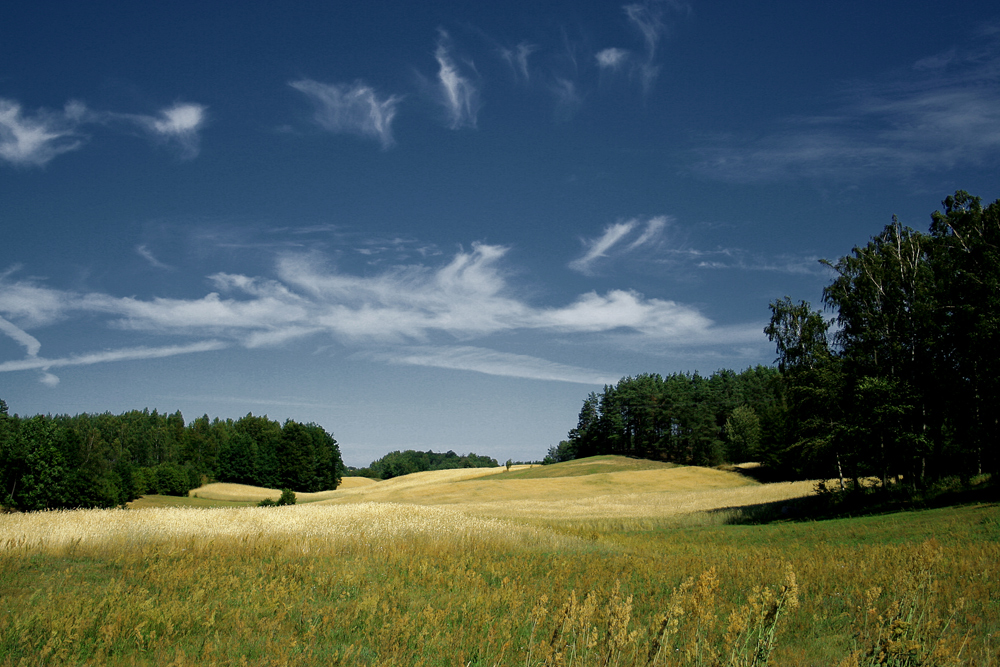

- Location within Poland
- Coordinates: 54°17′55″N 17°43′52″E
- Country: Poland
- Voivodeship: Pomeranian
- County: Kartuzy
- Gmina: Sierakowice
- Population: 144

Borowy Las ([bɔˈrɔvɨ ˈlas]; German: Borrowilaß) is a village in the administrative district of Gmina Sierakowice, within Kartuzy County, Pomeranian Voivodeship, in northern Poland.

For details of the history of the region, see History of Pomerania.
