= Janowo, Kartuzy County =

Janowo Janowò
- Village
- Location within Poland
- Coordinates: 54°19′23″N 17°53′27″E
- Country: Poland
- Voivodeship: Pomeranian
- County: Kartuzy
- Gmina: Sierakowice
- Population: 100

Janowo (Polish pronunciation: [jaˈnɔvɔ]) is a village in the administrative district of Gmina Sierakowice, within Kartuzy County, Pomeranian Voivodeship, in northern Poland.
