= Karłowo, Pomeranian Voivodeship =

Karłowo
- Village
- Location within Poland
- Coordinates: 54°18′14″N 17°51′1″E
- Country: Poland
- Voivodeship: Pomeranian
- County: Kartuzy
- Gmina: Sierakowice
- Population: 86

Karłowo [karˈwɔvɔ] is a village in the administrative district of Gmina Sierakowice, within Kartuzy County, Pomeranian Voivodeship, in northern Poland.

For details of the history of the region, see History of Pomerania.
