= Wygoda Sierakowska =

- Village
- Location within Poland
- Coordinates: 54°20′25″N 17°55′33″E
- Country: Poland
- Voivodeship: Pomeranian
- County: Kartuzy
- Gmina: Sierakowice
- Population: 84

Wygoda Sierakowska ([vɨˈɡɔda ɕɛraˈkɔfska]; Kashubian: Wigòda Serakòwskô) is a village in the administrative district of Gmina Sierakowice, within Kartuzy County, Pomeranian Voivodeship, in northern Poland.

For details of the history of the region, see History of Pomerania.
