= Kujaty =

- Village
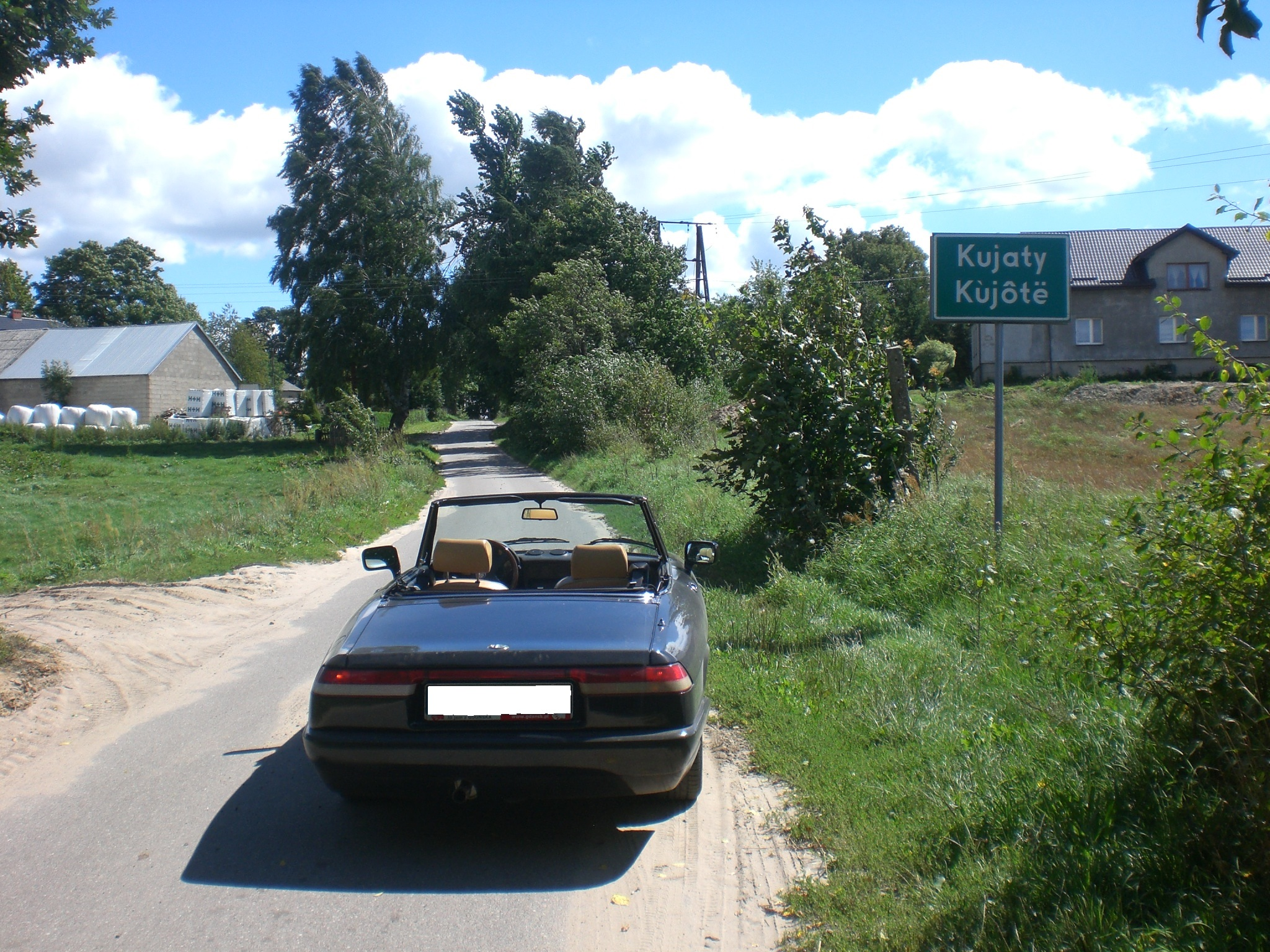

- Location within Poland
- Coordinates: 54°18′6″N 17°53′7″E
- Country: Poland
- Voivodeship: Pomeranian
- County: Kartuzy
- Gmina: Sierakowice
- Population: 128

Kujaty [kuˈjatɨ] is a Kashubian village in the administrative district of Gmina Sierakowice, within Kartuzy County, Pomeranian Voivodeship, in northern Poland.

For details of the history of the region, see History of Pomerania.
