= Stara Huta, Gmina Sierakowice =

Village in Kashubia

Stara Huta Stôrô Hëta
- Village
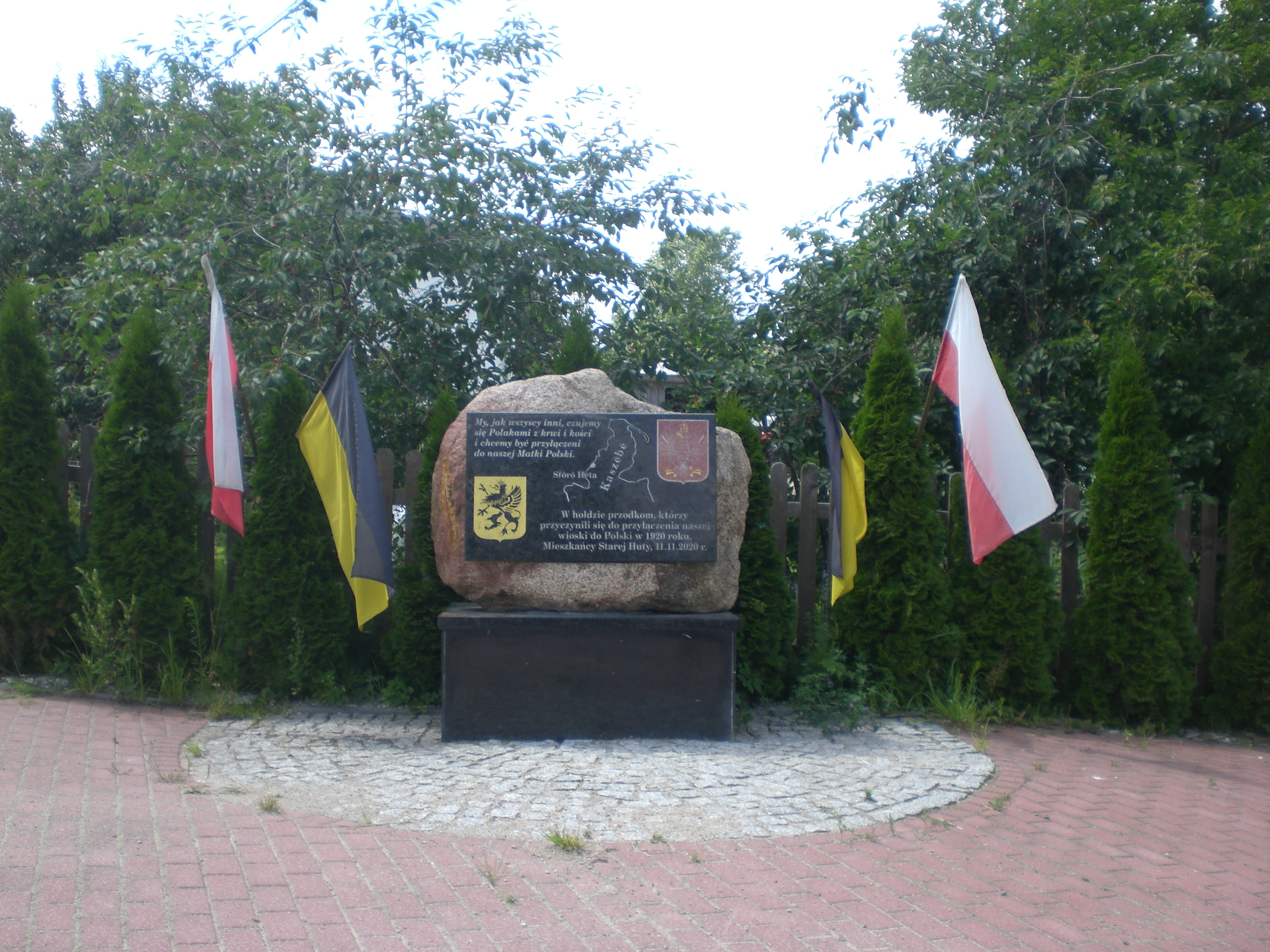
- A commemorative stone surrounded by the flag of Kashubia and Poland

- Location within Poland
- Coordinates: 54°18′51″N 17°43′7″E
- Country: Poland
- Voivodeship: Pomeranian
- County: Kartuzy
- Gmina: Sierakowice
- Population: 99

Stara Huta [ˈstara ˈxuta] (Kashubian: Stôrô Hëta) is a village in the administrative district of Gmina Sierakowice, within Kartuzy County, Pomeranian Voivodeship, in northern Poland.

For details of the history of the region, see History of Pomerania.
