= Kukówka, Gmina Sierakowice =

Kukówka
- Settlement
- Location within Poland
- Coordinates: 54°25′25″N 17°56′25″E
- Country: Poland
- Voivodeship: Pomeranian
- County: Kartuzy
- Gmina: Sierakowice
- Population: 4

Kukówka [kuˈkufka] is a settlement in the administrative district of Gmina Sierakowice, within Kartuzy County, Pomeranian Voivodeship, in northern Poland.

For details of the history of the region, see History of Pomerania.
