= Kamienica Królewska =

Kamienica Królewska Królewskô Kamiéńca
- Village
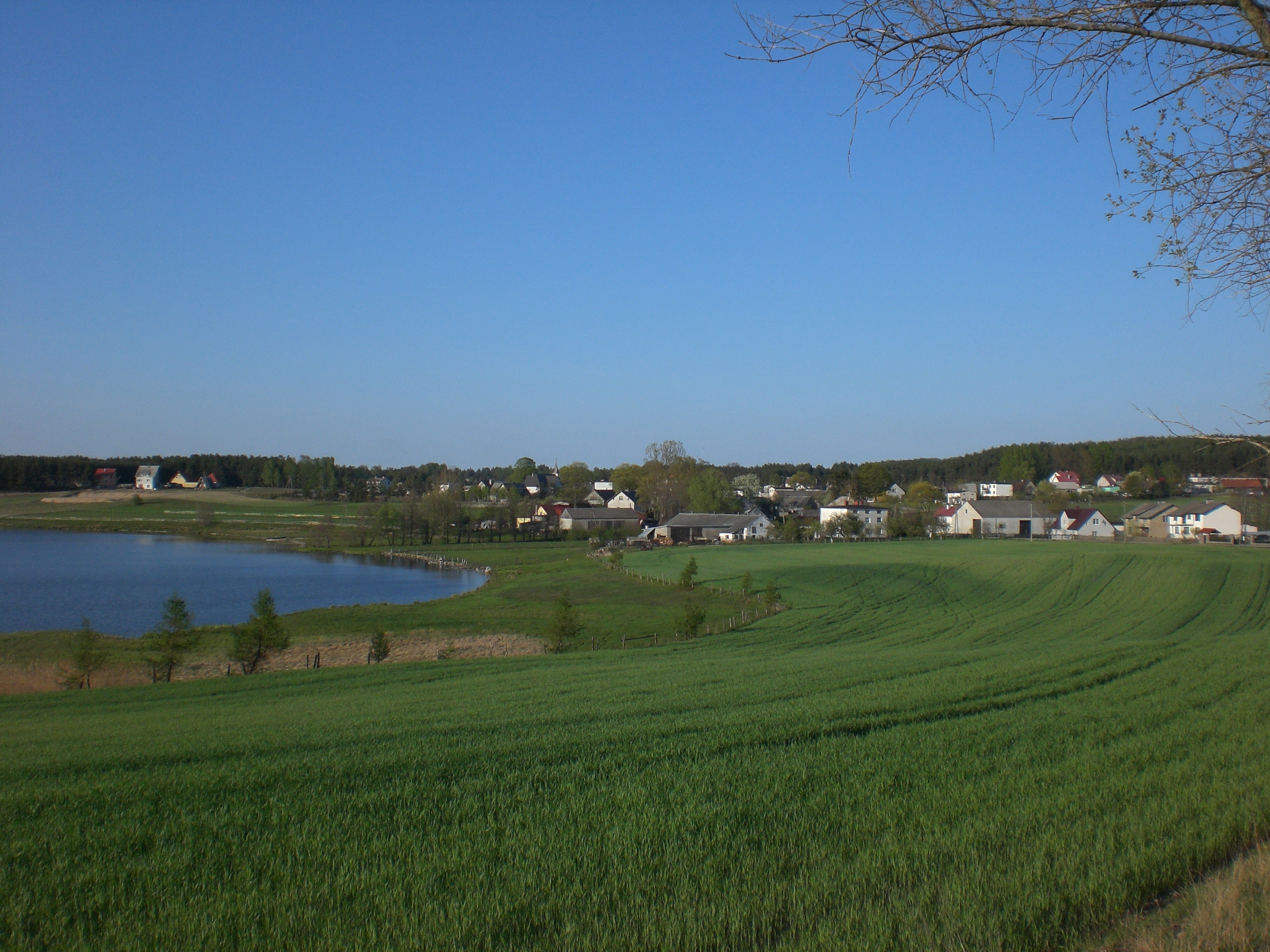

- Location within Poland
- Coordinates: 54°23′35″N 17°53′21″E
- Country: Poland
- Voivodeship: Pomeranian
- County: Kartuzy
- Gmina: Sierakowice
- Elevation: 150 m (490 ft)

Population
  - Total: 881
- Time zone: UTC+1 (CET)
  - Summer (DST): UTC+2 (CEST)
- Vehicle registration: GKA

Kamienica Królewska [kamjɛˈnit͡sa kruˈlɛfska] (Kashubian: Królewskô Kamiéńca) is a village in the administrative district of Gmina Sierakowice, within Kartuzy County, Pomeranian Voivodeship, in northern Poland. It is located in the ethnocultural region of Kashubia in the historic region of Pomerania.

== History ==
During the German occupation of Poland (World War II), the Polish resistance printed Polish underground press in Kamienica Królewska. Six Polish citizens were murdered by Nazi Germany in the village during World War II.
