= Welk, Pomeranian Voivodeship =

Welk
- Village
- Location within Poland
- Coordinates: 54°18′50″N 17°55′52″E
- Country: Poland
- Voivodeship: Pomeranian
- County: Kartuzy
- Gmina: Sierakowice
- Population: 104

Welk [vɛlk] is a village in the administrative district of Gmina Sierakowice, within Kartuzy County, Pomeranian Voivodeship, in northern Poland.

== See also ==
- History of Pomerania
