= Lemany, Pomeranian Voivodeship =

Lemany
- Village
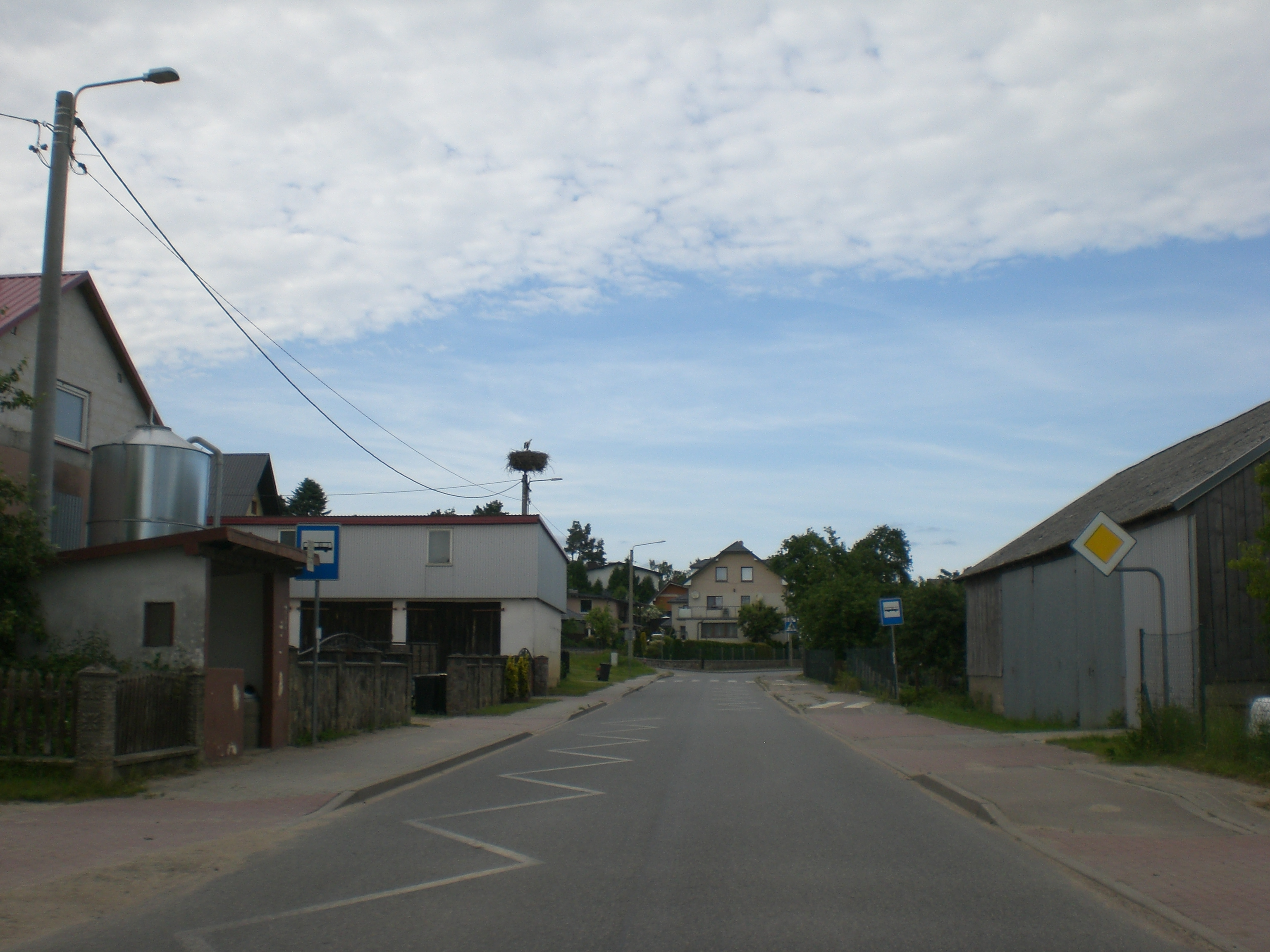

- Location within Poland
- Coordinates: 54°18′23″N 17°46′35″E
- Country: Poland
- Voivodeship: Pomeranian
- County: Kartuzy
- Gmina: Sierakowice
- Elevation: 165 m (541 ft)
- Population: 129
- Time zone: UTC+1 (CET)
  - Summer (DST): UTC+2 (CEST)

Lemany [lɛˈmanɨ] is a village in the administrative district of Gmina Sierakowice, within Kartuzy County, Pomeranian Voivodeship, in northern Poland.
