= Mojusz =

- Village
- Location within Poland
- Coordinates: 54°20′44″N 17°57′59″E
- Country: Poland
- Voivodeship: Pomeranian
- County: Kartuzy
- Gmina: Sierakowice
- Elevation: 269 m (883 ft)

Population
  - Total: 502

Mojusz [ˈmɔjuʂ] is a village in the administrative district of Gmina Sierakowice, within Kartuzy County, Pomeranian Voivodeship, in northern Poland.

For details of the history of the region, see History of Pomerania.
