= Sierakowice, Pomeranian Voivodeship =

Village in Pomeranian Voivodeship, Poland

Sierakowice Serakòjce
- Village
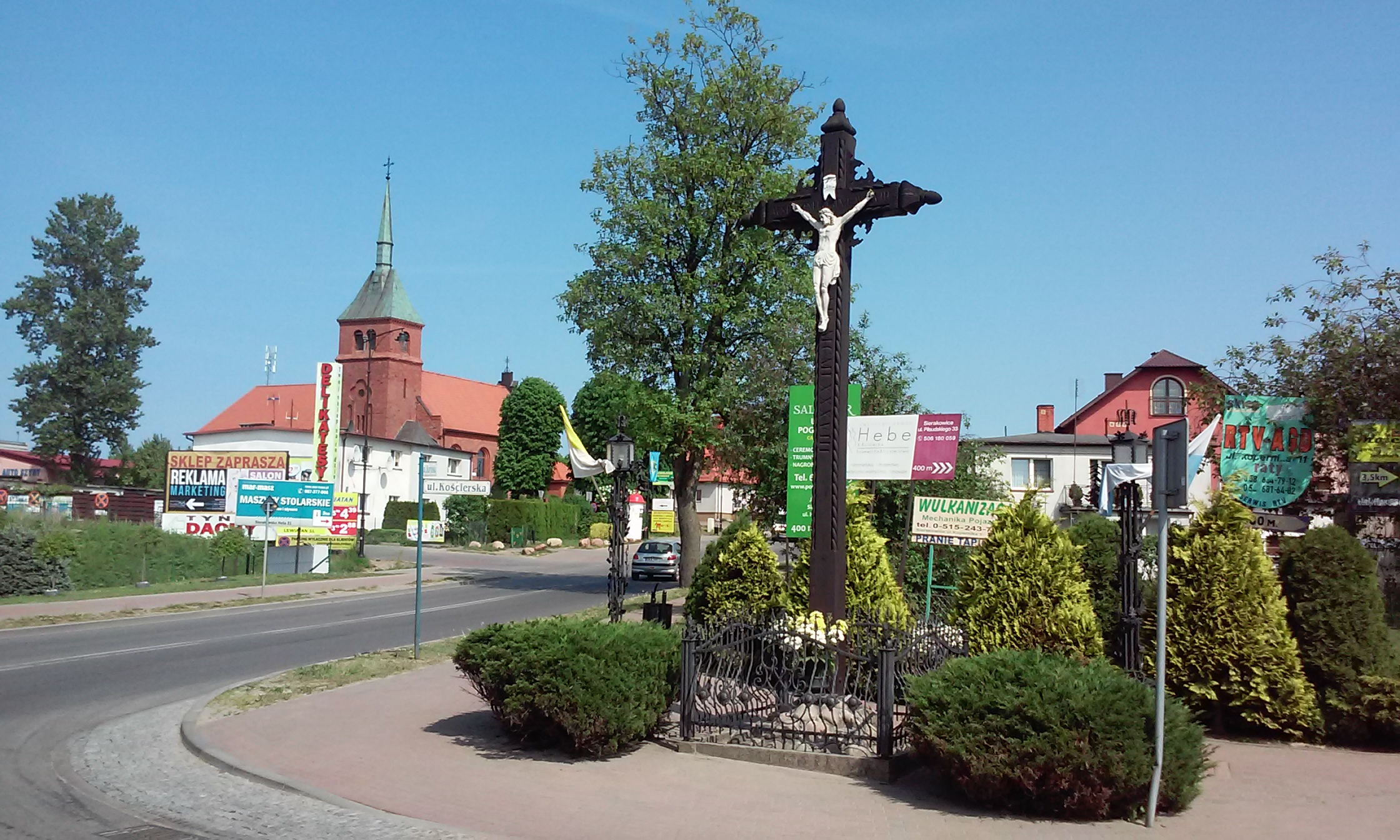
- Wayside cross with the Saint John the Baptist church in the background

- Location within Poland
- Coordinates: 54°20′46″N 17°53′30″E
- Country: Poland
- Voivodeship: Pomeranian
- County: Kartuzy
- Gmina: Sierakowice

Population
  - Total: 7,068
- (2007)
- Website: www.sierakowice.pl

Sierakowice [ɕɛrakɔˈvit͡sɛ] is a village in Kartuzy County, Pomeranian Voivodeship, in northern Poland. It is the seat of the gmina (administrative district) called Gmina Sierakowice. It is located in the ethnocultural region of Kashubia in the historic region of Pomerania.

Kashubian is here in official use, as a regional language or an auxiliary language. This means that in principle, it is possible to address gmina's administration in Kashubian and receive an answer in the same language. In Sierakowice, roads direction signage is bilingual Polish/Kashubian.

Kashubian vetch (Vicia cassubica) is native to the village. Kashubian vetch means vetch of Kashubia, the home of Kashubs.

Five Polish citizens were murdered by Nazi Germany in the village during World War II.

== Notable people born here ==
- Danuta Stenka (born 1961), Polish actress
