= Gdynia Port Oksywie railway station =

Railway station in Gdynia, Poland

Coordinates: 54°32′33″N 18°32′35″E

Gdynia Port Oksywie
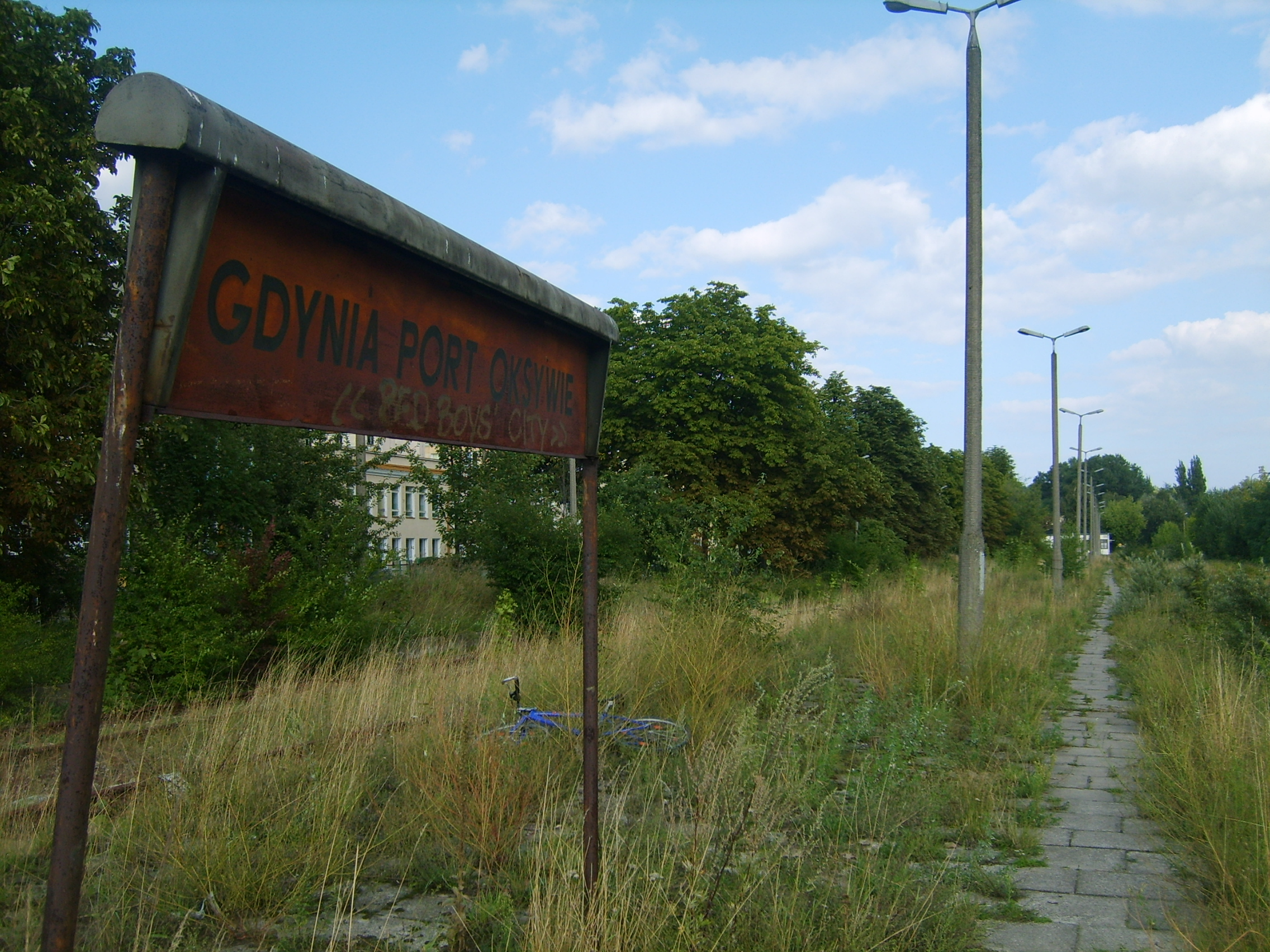

General information
- Location: Obłuże, Gdynia; Poland
- Owner: Polskie Koleje Państwowe S.A.
- Platforms: 2

Construction
- Structure type: Building: Yes (no longer used); Depot: Never existed Water tower: Never existed
Location

Gdynia Port Oksywie is a no longer operational PKP freight railway station in Gdynia (Pomeranian Voivodeship), Poland.

== Lines crossing the station ==
Start station	End station	Line type
Rumia	Gdynia Port Oksywie	Freight
