= Həsənli =

== Azerbaijan ==
- Hasanlı, Jabrayil, Azerbaijan
- Həsənli, Barda, Azerbaijan
- Həsənli, Jalilabad, Azerbaijan
- Həsənli, Masally, Azerbaijan
- Həsənli, Sabirabad, Azerbaijan
- Həsənli, Salyan, Azerbaijan
- Həsənli, Tovuz, Azerbaijan

== Iran ==
- Hasanli, Iran, a village in West Azerbaijan Province

== Turkey ==
- Hasanlı, Besni, a village in the district of Besni, Adıyaman Province
- Hasanlı, Sincik, a village in the district of Sincik, Adıyaman Province
