= Hasanov =

Hasanov (masculine, Azerbaijani: Həsənov ("belonging to Həsən"), Uzbek: Hasanov, Tajik: Ҳасанов, Russian: Гасанов, Ukrainian: Гасанов) and Hasanova (feminine) is an Azerbaijani, Uzbek and Tajik surname. It is a slavicized patronymic surname derived from the Arabic male given name Hasan.

Variants are Gasanov and Khasanov.

Notable people with the surname include:

== Hasanov ==
- Ali Hasanov (born 1976), Azerbaijani artist, musician and filmmaker
- Ali S. Hasanov (born 1948), Azerbaijani politician
- Aliagha Hasanov (1871–1933), Azerbaijani statesman
- Elkhan Hasanov (born 1967), Azerbaijani goalkeeper
- Faiq Hasanov (born 1940), Azerbaijani chess player
- Gayratjon Hasanov (born 1983), Uzbek footballer
- Gotfrid Hasanov (1900–1965), Russian composer of Lezgian descent
- Hasan Hasanov (born 1940), Azerbaijani politician and diplomat
- Huseyn Hasanov (born 1986), paralympian athlete from Azerbaijan
- Jabrayil Hasanov (born 1990), Azerbaijani wrestler
- Karam Hasanov (born 1969), Azerbaijani politician
- Khurshed Hasanov (born 1973), Tajikistani boxer
- Mohammed Hasanov (1959–2020), Azerbaijani military personnel
- Namig Hasanov (born 1979), Azerbaijani footballer
- Rahim Hasanov (born 1983), Azerbaijani football referee
- Ramil Hasanov (born 1996), Ukrainian footballer
- Ramin Hasanov (born 1977), Azerbaijani diplomat
- Ramiz Hasanov (born 1961), Azerbaijani politician
- Rashad Hasanov (born 1985), Azerbaijani democracy activist
- Samir Hasanov (born 1967), former Soviet and Ukrainian footballer
- Sardar Hasanov (born 1985), Azerbaijani weightlifter
- Sayavush Hasanov (1964–1992), Azerbaijani military personnel
- Tabriz Hasanov (born 1967), Azerbaijani footballer
- Tahir Hasanov (1970–1992), Azerbaijani military personnel
- Zakir Hasanov (born 1959), Azerbaijani politician

== Hasanova ==
- Alla Hasanova (born 1970), Azerbaijani volleyball player
- Gulkhar Hasanova (1918–2005), Azerbaijani mugham opera singer
- Lala Hasanova (born 1978), Azerbaijani-Russian science fiction writer and lawyer of Jewish ancestry
- Olena Hasanova (born 1995), Ukrainian-born Azerbaijani volleyball player
- Shamama Hasanova (1923–2008), Azerbaijani cotton grower and politician
- Südaba Hasanova (born 1947), Azerbaijani magistrate
- Zamina Hasanova (1918–2006), Azerbaijani metallurgist

== See also ==
- Hassan (surname)
- Hassan
- Həsənli (disambiguation)
- Hasanova, Karayazı
