= Haji Majid Bath =

Old baths in Corat district, Sumgayit, Azerbaijan

- HacI Məcid hamamI
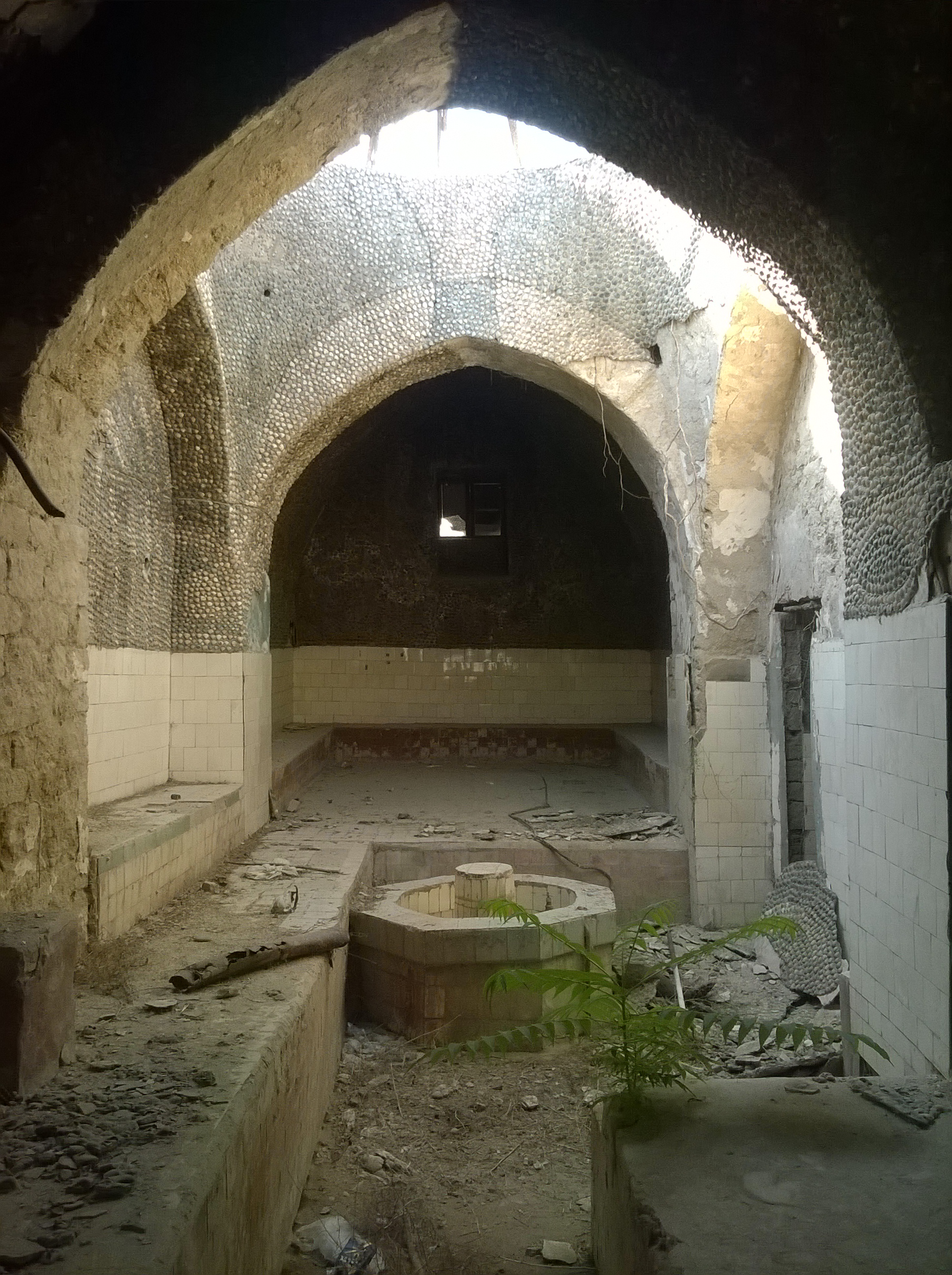
- Current state of the building
- Interactive map of Haji Majid Bath
- Location: Sumgayit
- Coordinates: 40°34′28.8″N 49°42′40.1″E
- Opening date: 16th century

Hammam Haji Mejid (Azerbaijani: Hacı Məcid hamamı) is a hammam (bathhouse) built in the 16th century in the Sumgait region of Jorat, Azerbaijan. Despite its historical value, the building is not protected by the state; it is abandoned and gradually disintegrating.

== History ==
The Haji Mejid baths were built in the 16th century on the sulfur springs in Jorat under the guidance of a local resident named Alimkhan. In the 17th century, under the leadership of Haji Amrulla Bey, a new bathhouse was built in Jorat.

=== Description ===
The baths are located in the Sumgayit Jorat region near the coast of the Caspian Sea. The building of the hammam is stone; the floor is located below ground level. At a depth of about one and a half meters underground, from the bathhouse to the sea, clay pipes were laid to discharge wastewater. Sulfurous water was supplied to the bath from a nearby source.

==== Current state ====
In June 2016, the news publication Heberle stated that the Haji Mejid hammam was designated as being under protection. In an interview dated April 22, 2019, the press secretary of the State Service for the Protection, Development and Restoration of Cultural Heritage under the Ministry of Culture of the Republic of Azerbaijan, Fariz Huseynov, said that the building was not registered as a monument.

At the same time, he noted that the Azerbaijani Ministry of Culture has plans to put the Haji Majid hammam under protection as a monument of the cultural heritage of Azerbaijan and restore the building to attract tourists. By this time, the baths had been abandoned for about 70 years and were not protected by the state in any way, which led to their gradual destruction.
