= Zamina Hasanova =

First female metallurgist in Azerbaijan

- Born: 10 May 1918; Corat, Sumqayit, Azerbaijan SSR
- Died: 2006 (aged 87–88); Sumqayit, Azerbaijan
- Awards: Hero of Socialist Labour
- Scientific career
- Fields: Metallurgy

Zamina Hasan qizi Hasanova (Azerbaijani: Zəminə Həsən qızı Həsənova; 10 May 1918 in Corat, Sumqayit, Azerbaijan SSR – 2006 in Sumqayit, Azerbaijan) was a Hero of Socialist Labour, Honorary Citizen of Sumgayit, and the first female metallurgist in Azerbaijan.

== Biography ==
Zamina Hasanova was born on May 10, 1918, in Sumgayit, present-day Jorat settlement.

== Career ==
Hasanova started her first job at the Sumgayit Power Station. During the Soviet era, she worked as the chairman of the Energy Union and was engaged in laying the foundations of residential buildings. She worked in the civil defense system of Baku during the Second World War. After the war, she continued her career at the Boruprokat factory. Later, she served as a brigadier. Hasanova was the chief brigadier in 1970 and led four brigades at that factory.

== Public career ==
Hasanova was one of the organizers of the Horizont 8 club for schoolchildren. She was the member of Sumgait City Council and the Supreme Council of the USSR.

== Honors ==
Zamina Hasanova was awarded

- Order of Lenin (1960)
- Hero of Socialist Labour (1960)
- Honorary Citizen of Sumgayit (1969)

On October 2, 2002, by the order of the President of Azerbaijan, Zamina Hasanova was awarded with a personal scholarship from the President of Azerbaijan for her activities in science, education, culture, and economy.

== Memorial ==
Zamina Hasanova died in Sumgayit in 2006. The song titled "Zamina" composed by Alakbar Taghiyev was dedicated to Hasanova.

== See also ==
- Hero of Socialist Labour
