= Gasanov =

Gasanov, feminine: Gasanova is a Central Asian surname, a Russian-language spelling variant of Hasanov. Notable people with the surname include:

- Amir Gasanov (born 1987), Russian footballer
- Anastasia Gasanova
- Dzhamaladin Gasanov (born 1964), Russian politician
- Eldar Gasanov (born 1982), Ukrainian chess player
- Elina Gasanova
- Elmar Gasanov (born 1983), Ukrainian classical pianist
- Nasiba Gasanova
- Shamil Gasanov (born 1993), Russian footballer
