= Trolleybuses in Sumgait =

Former Azerbaijani public transport system

Sumqayit trolleybus system

Operation
- Locale: Sumqayit, Azerbaijan
- Open: 28 April 1961
- Close: 31 December 2005
- Status: Closed
- Lines: 8 (max)

Infrastructure
- Stock: 13 (recent)

Statistics
- Route length: 48.9 km (30.4 mi) (max)

The Sumqayit trolleybus system was a system of trolleybuses forming part of the public transport service in Sumqayit (alternatively transliterated as Sumgait), the third most populous city in Azerbaijan, for most of the second half of the 20th century.

== History ==
The system was opened on 28 April 1961. At its height, it consisted of eight lines. The only remaining line was closed on 31 December 2005 (i.e., with effect from 1 January 2006).

== Services ==
The line operating immediately before closure of the system was:

6. Торговый центр (Shopping Centre) - Микрорайоны (Neighbourhoods)

== Fleet ==
The Sumqayit trolleybus fleet in the period leading up to the system's closure was made up of 13 vehicles of type ZiU-9.

Previously, the system had used trolleybus vehicles of the following types:

- MTB-82
- Škoda 9Tr
- ZiU-5

== See also ==
- History of Sumqayit
- List of trolleybus systems
- Trolleybuses in former Soviet Union countries
