= Building of Sumgait City Executive Power =

- Azerbaijani: Sumqayıt Şəhər İcra Hakimiyyətinin binası
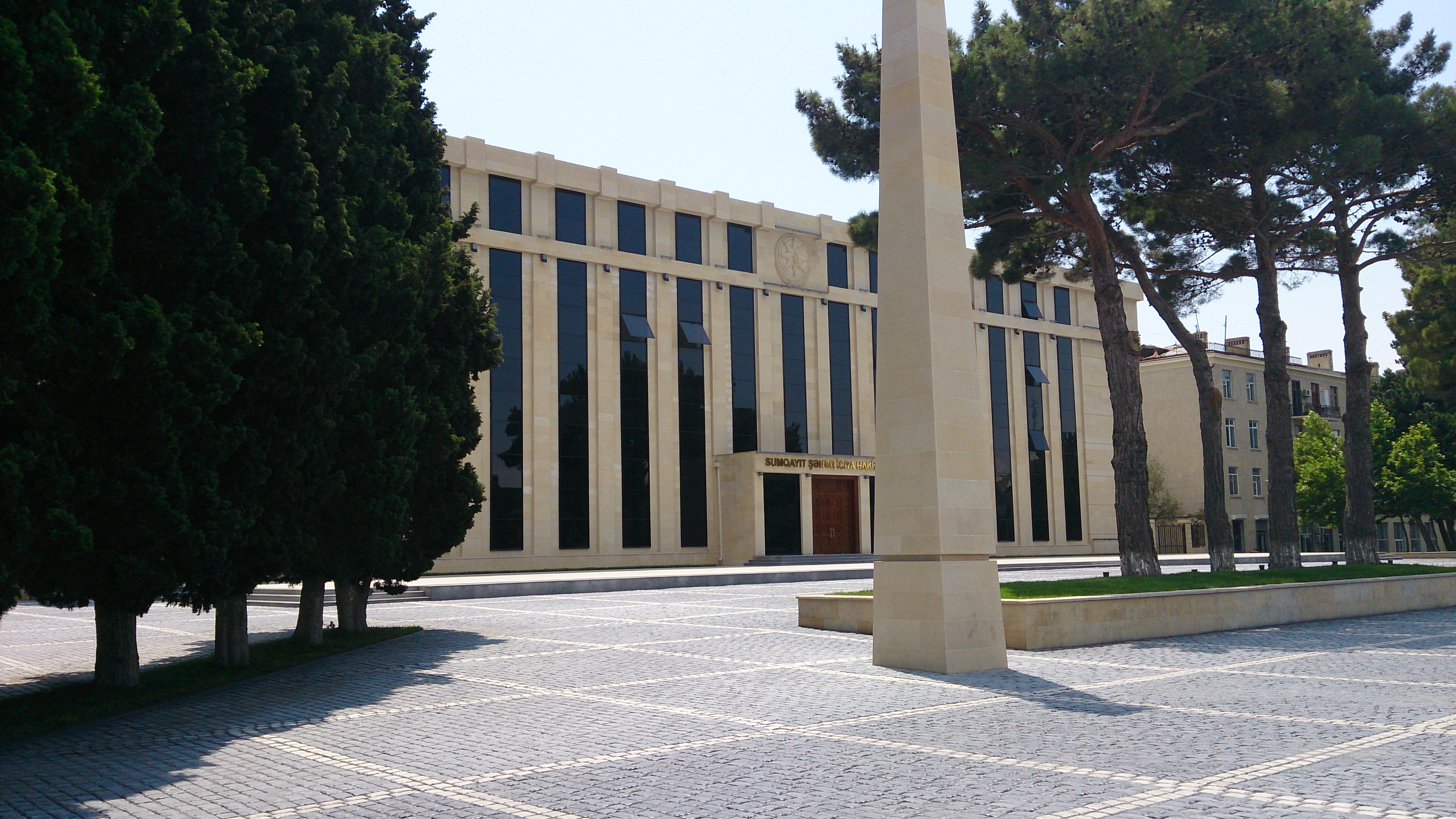
- The building after the green roof was removed, 2013

- Location within Azerbaijan

General information
- Type: Government building
- Architectural style: Neoclassical architecture
- Location: Azerbaijan Avenue, 9, Sumgait, Azerbaijan
- Coordinates: 40.595749°N 49.668406°E
- Completed: 1958
- Client: Sumgait City Party Committee

Technical details
- Floor count: 2

The Building of Sumgait City Executive Power, also known as the Green Building (lit. Yaşıl bina), is an administrative building in Sumgait, located at Azerbaijan Avenue, 9.

== History ==
The building of the Sumgait City Executive Power was constructed and put into operation in 1958. Initially, it housed the Sumgait City Party Committee and the executive committee of the City Council of People's Deputies. In the late 1950s and early 1960s, the first floor of the building experienced persistent dampness, which was attributed to the influence of the salty north wind from the Caspian Sea.

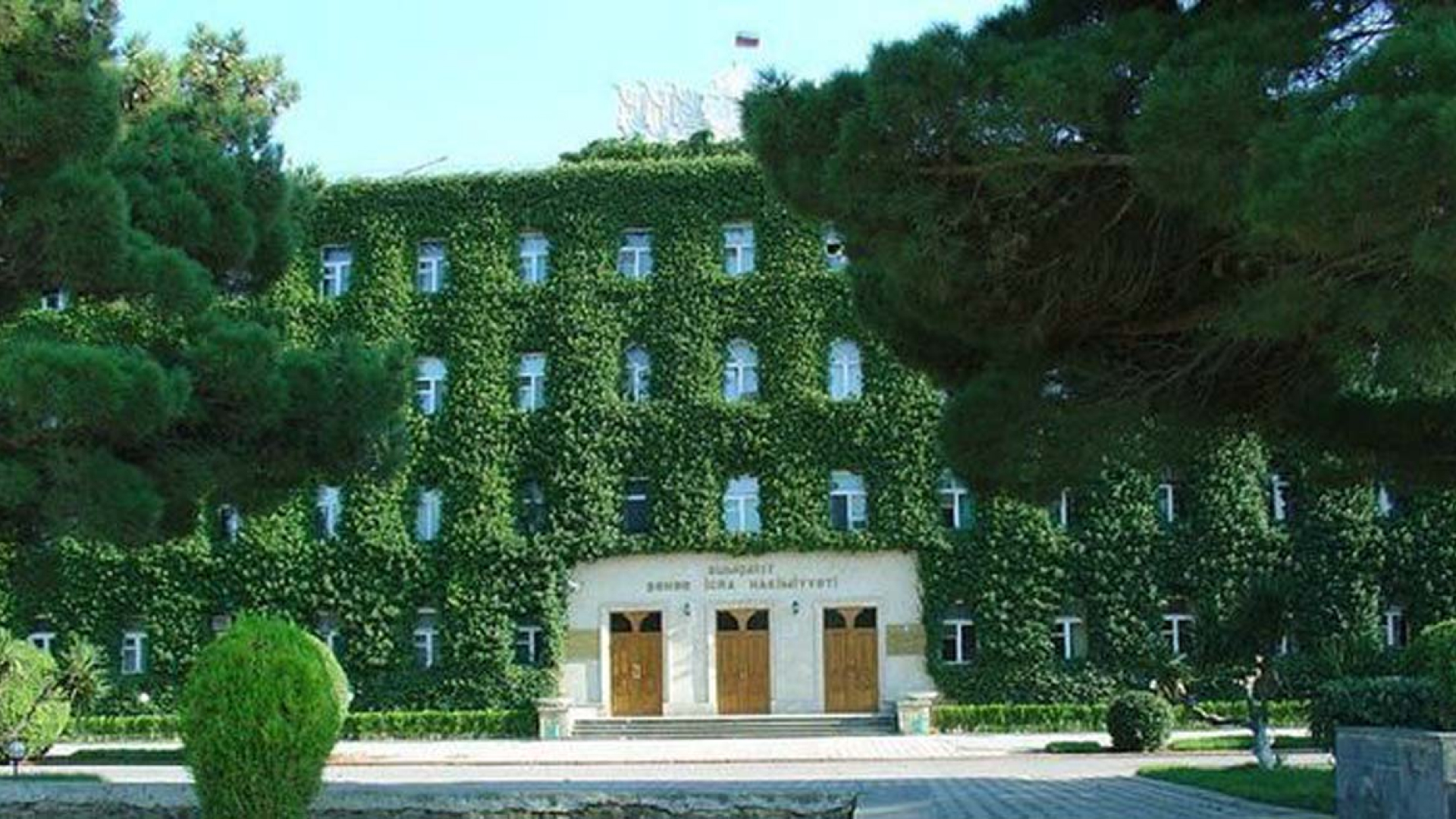
Ivy-covered Sumgait City Executive Power building

To address this issue, during the tenure of Kamal Akhundov as chairman of the Sumgait City Executive Committee, a landscaping project was implemented. Special ivy plants were brought from Kazan, Tatarstan, and planted along the building's perimeter. Over time, the ivy covered the entire facade, giving the structure a distinctive green appearance.

The building became a recognized architectural feature of Sumgait and was noted beyond the city. A stamp depicting the building was issued in Ludwigshafen, Germany, a sister city of Sumgait.

=== The end of the green cover ===
In 2010, during the tenure of then-mayor Vagif Aliyev, the ivy covering the "Green Building" began to wither and was subsequently removed. This event sparked public discussion, particularly in the media and on social networks, and was met with criticism. At the time, the Sumgait City Executive Power stated that the ivy had dried out due to reaching the end of its vegetative cycle.

During the building's renovation in 2012, an informational plaque indicated that the greenery would be restored. However, this did not occur, and the building remained in a gray-colored appearance.

== Restoration ==
In 2016, the head of the executive branch, Zakir Farajov, gave a special order regarding the building, and after that, ivy bushes were planted on the opposite side of the building.
