= Məşədivəlilər =

- Location within Azerbaijan
- Coordinates: 40°40′N 45°33′E
- Country: Azerbaijan
- Rayon: Tovuz
- Municipality: Həsənli
- Time zone: UTC+4 (AZT)
  - Summer (DST): UTC+5 (AZT)

Məşədivəlilər (also, Məşədivəllər, Meshadivelilar, and Meshedi-Veliler) is a village in the Tovuz Rayon of Azerbaijan. The village forms part of the municipality of Həsənli.
