= Sumgait Canyon =

Landform in Sumgait, Azerbaijan

Sumgait canyon
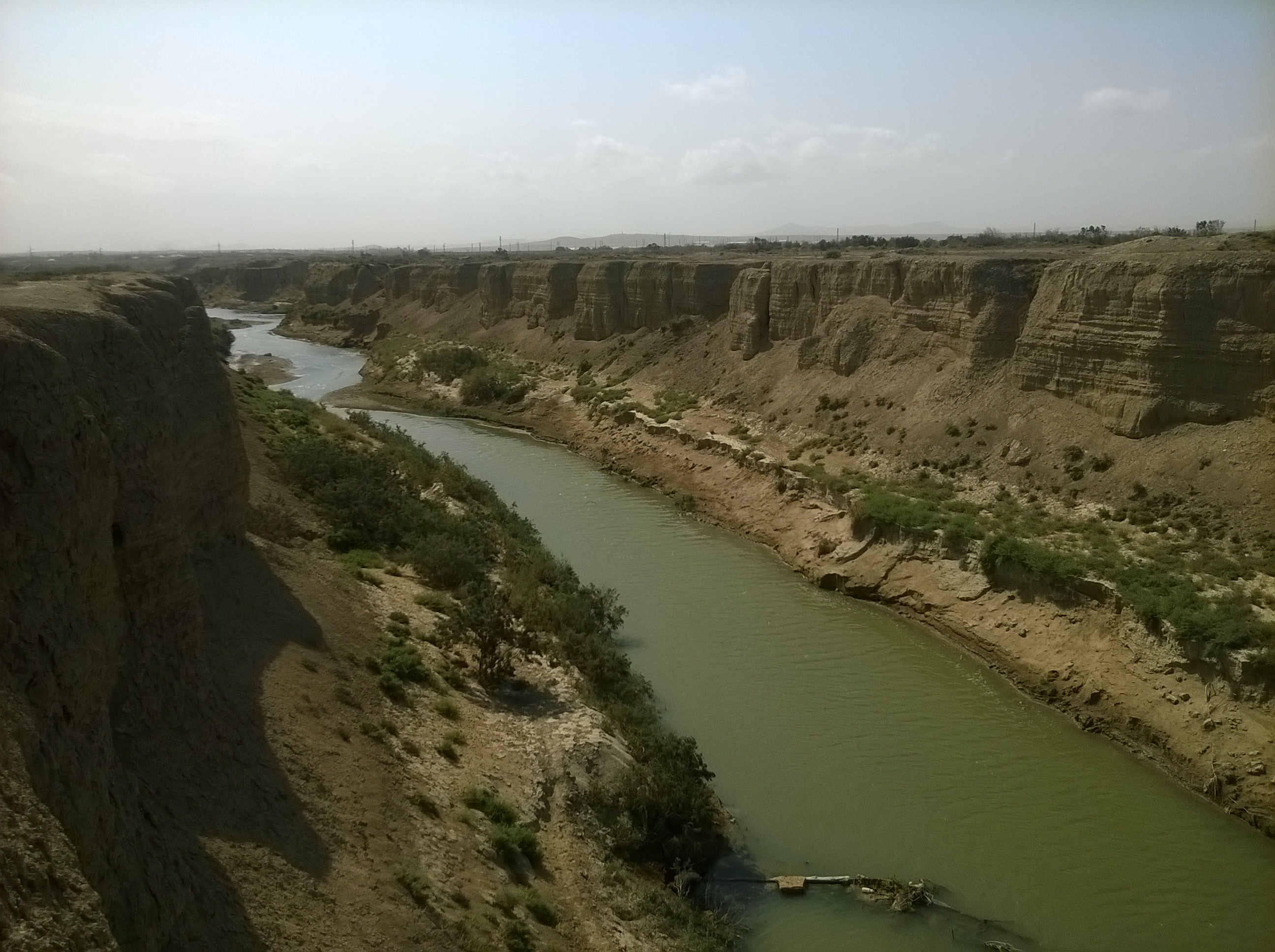

Geography
- Location: Sumgait, Azerbaijan
- Rivers: Sumgaitchai river

Sumgait Canyon (Azerbaijani: Sumqayıt kanyonu) or Sumgayitchai Canyon is a natural monument located in a part of the Sumgaitchai river flow. The canyon is located on the back of the Sumgait municipal waste landfill. This canyon is considered a potential destination for tourism in Sumgait.

Sumgaitchai downstream flows through the Sumgait canyon into the Caspian Sea. In this part, the river bed is rather fragile. The earth is composed of clay and sand, which increases the destructive power of the river. This allows the river to easily deepen its course. The canyon erosion activity is quite high. Due to the atmospheric precipitation, the solar radiation and the wind activity, the canyon takes on a mysterious look. As the process continues, the scale of weathering is constantly increasing.

The height and width of the canyon varies depending on where it flows. The average height is 10 to 15 meters (33 to 49 ft) and the width ranges from 30 to 50 meters.

== Gallery ==
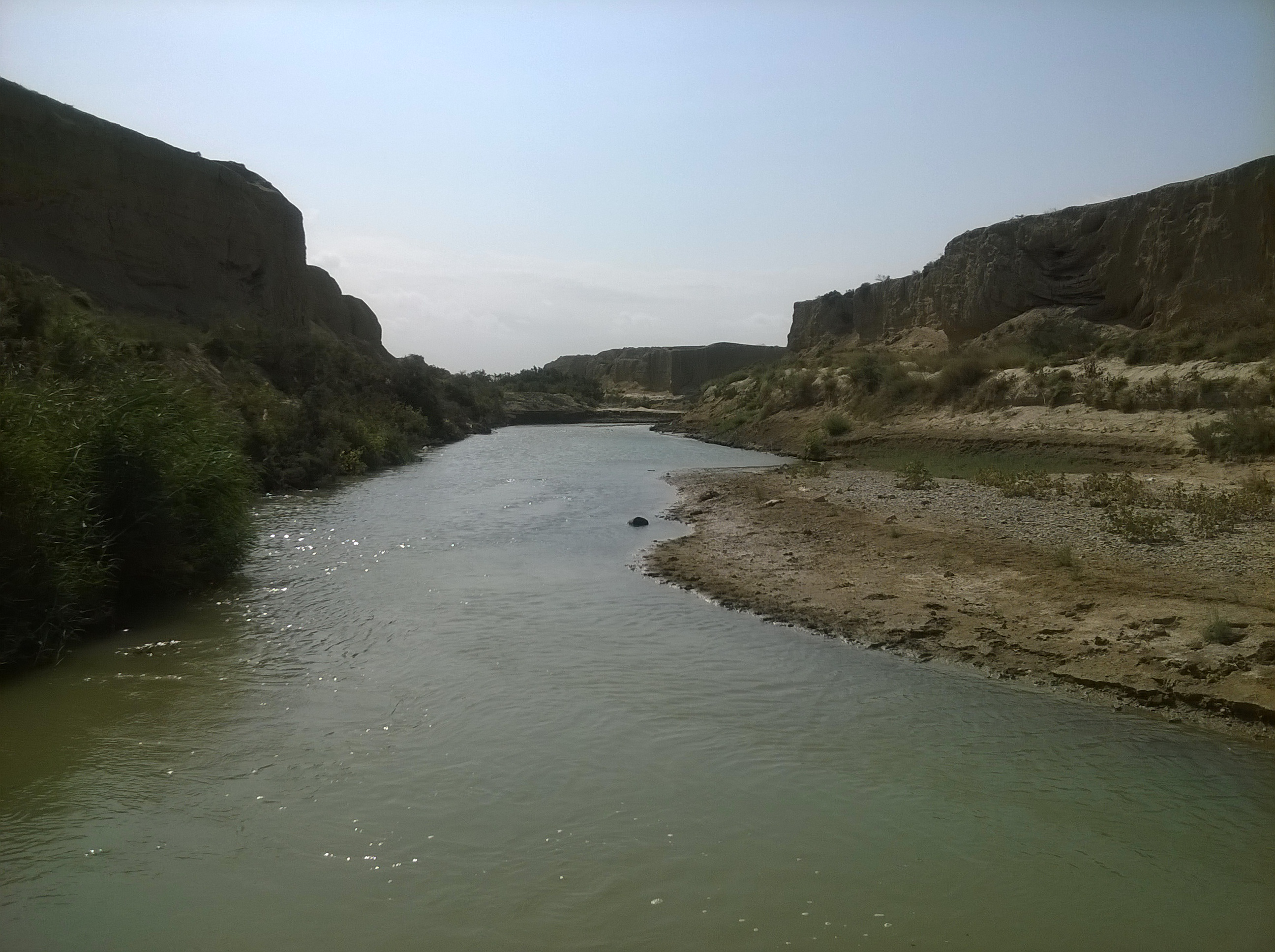
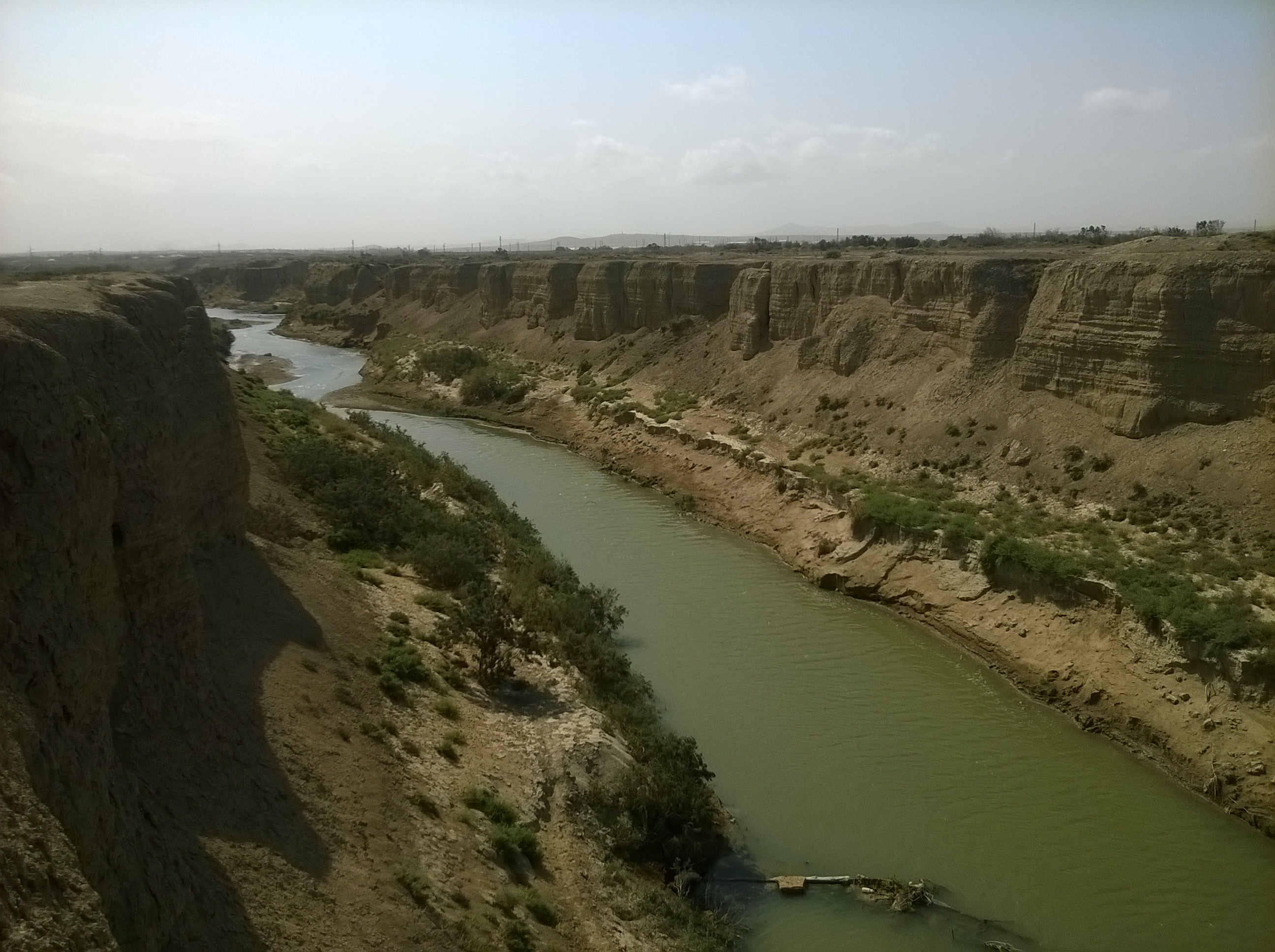

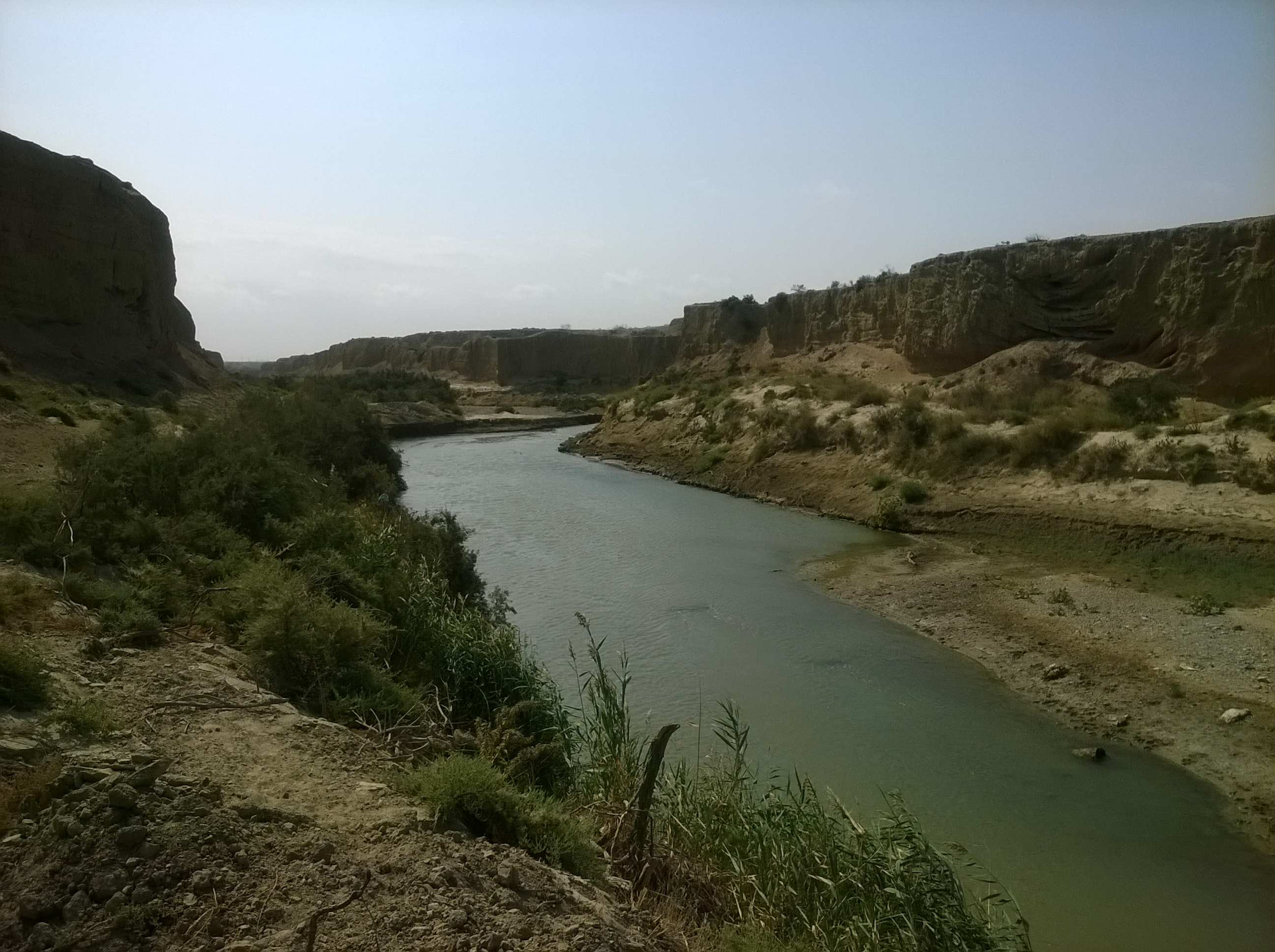

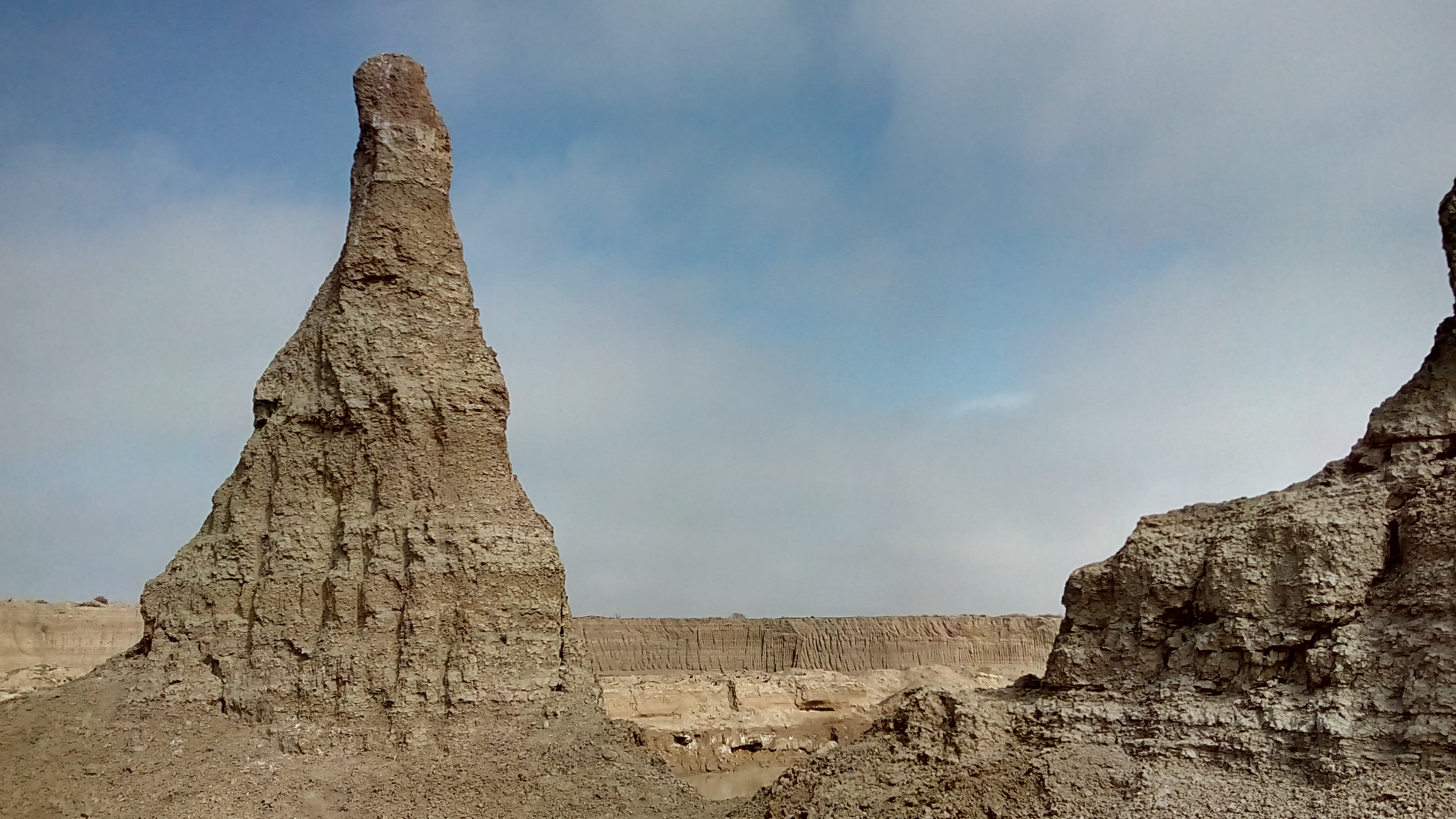

== See also ==
- Sumgait
