= Sumgayitchay (river) =

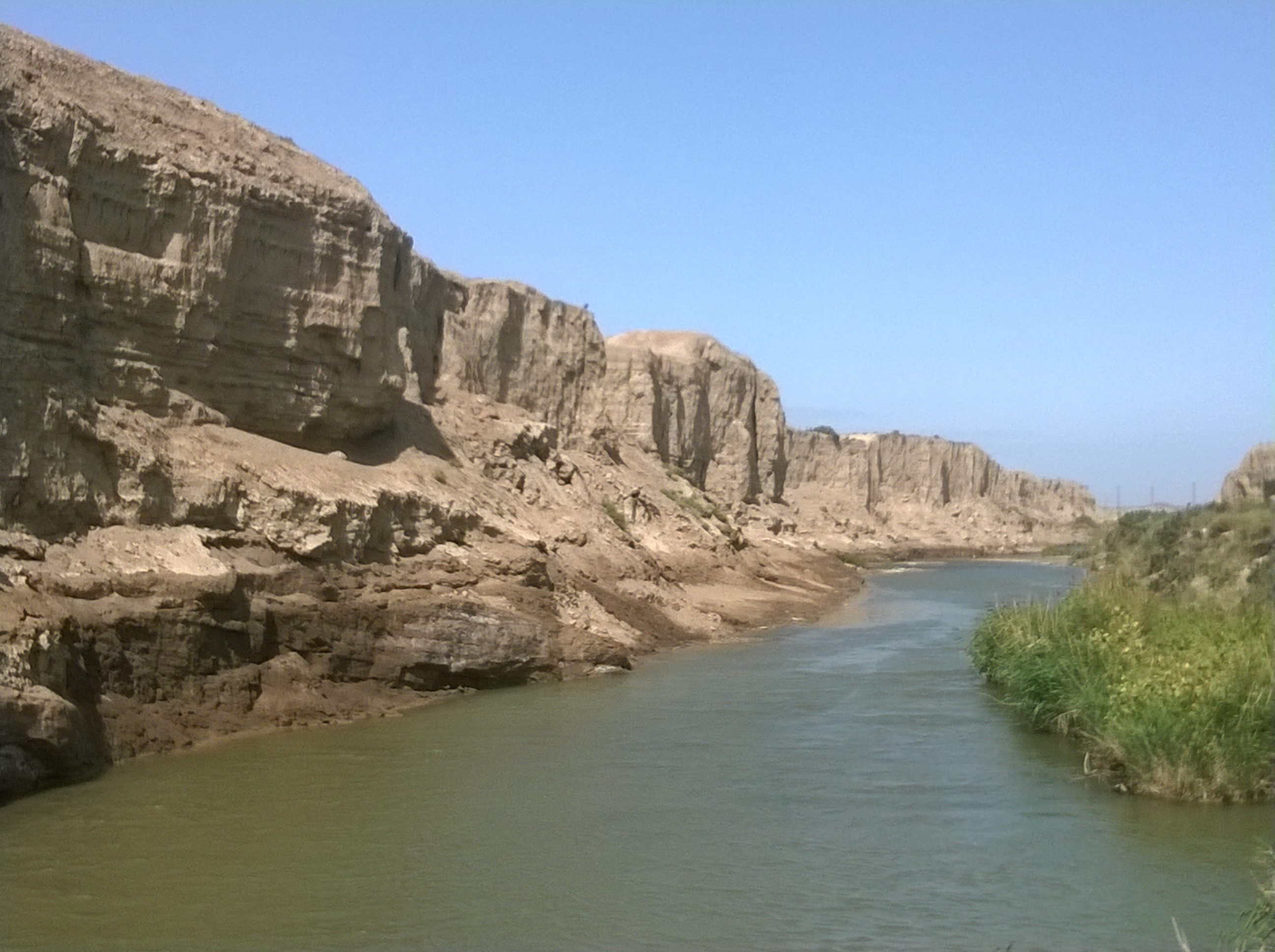
- Native name: Sumqayıtçay (Azerbaijani)

Location
- Country: Azerbaijan

Physical characteristics
- Source: Greater Caucasus
- Mouth: Caspian Sea
  - coordinates: 40°37′02″N 49°36′48″E
- Length: 88 km (55 mi)

Sumgayitchay (Azerbaijani: Sumqayıtçay) is a river situated in the east part of Azerbaijan. Its length is 198 km, and its drainage basin area is 1800 km². The average discharge for 46 km from the mouth is 1.1 m³/s.

It originates on the slopes of the Greater Caucasus. Has a mixed food. The waters of the river are used for irrigation. The city of Sumgayit is located at the mouth.

== Gallery ==
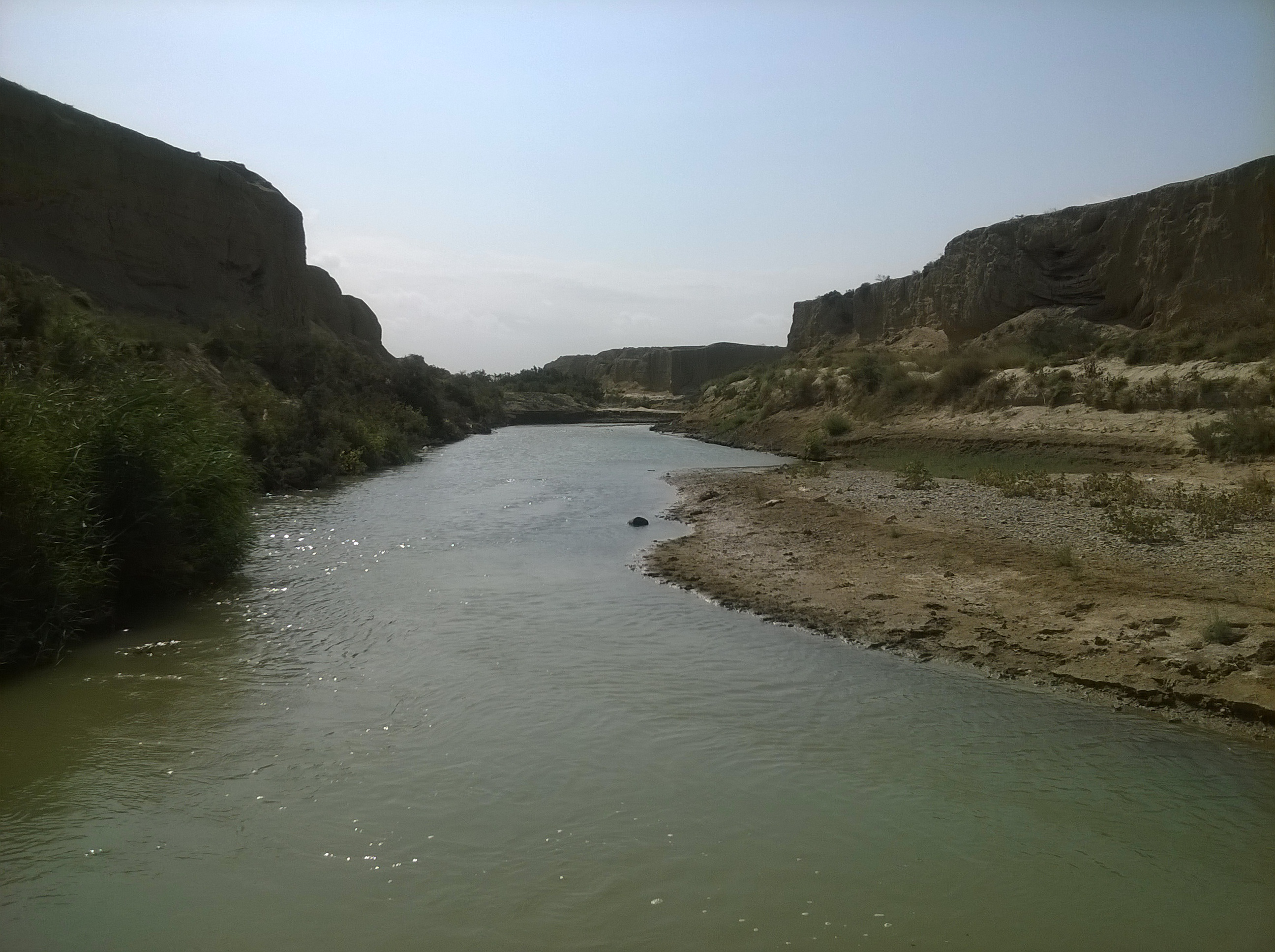

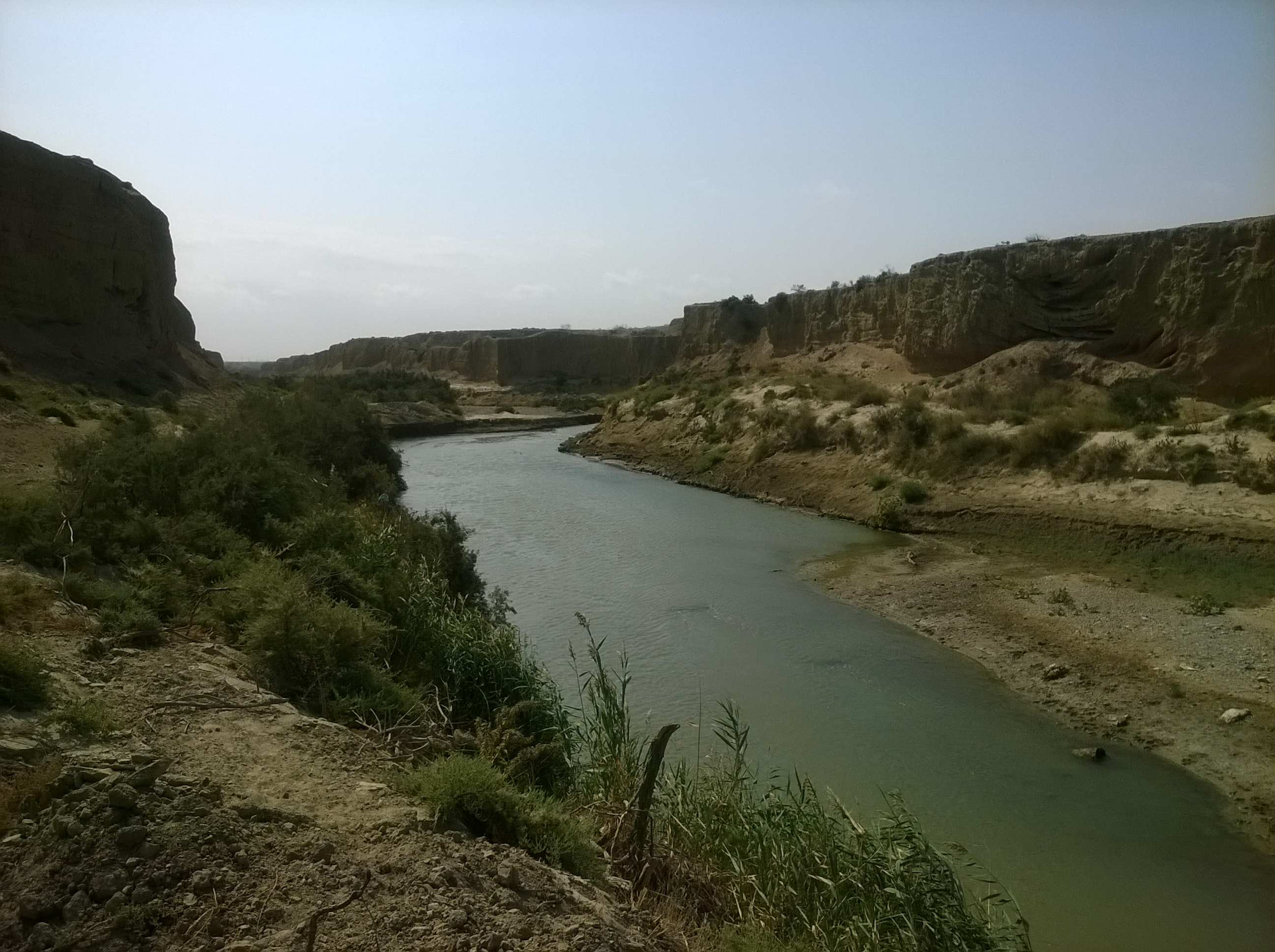

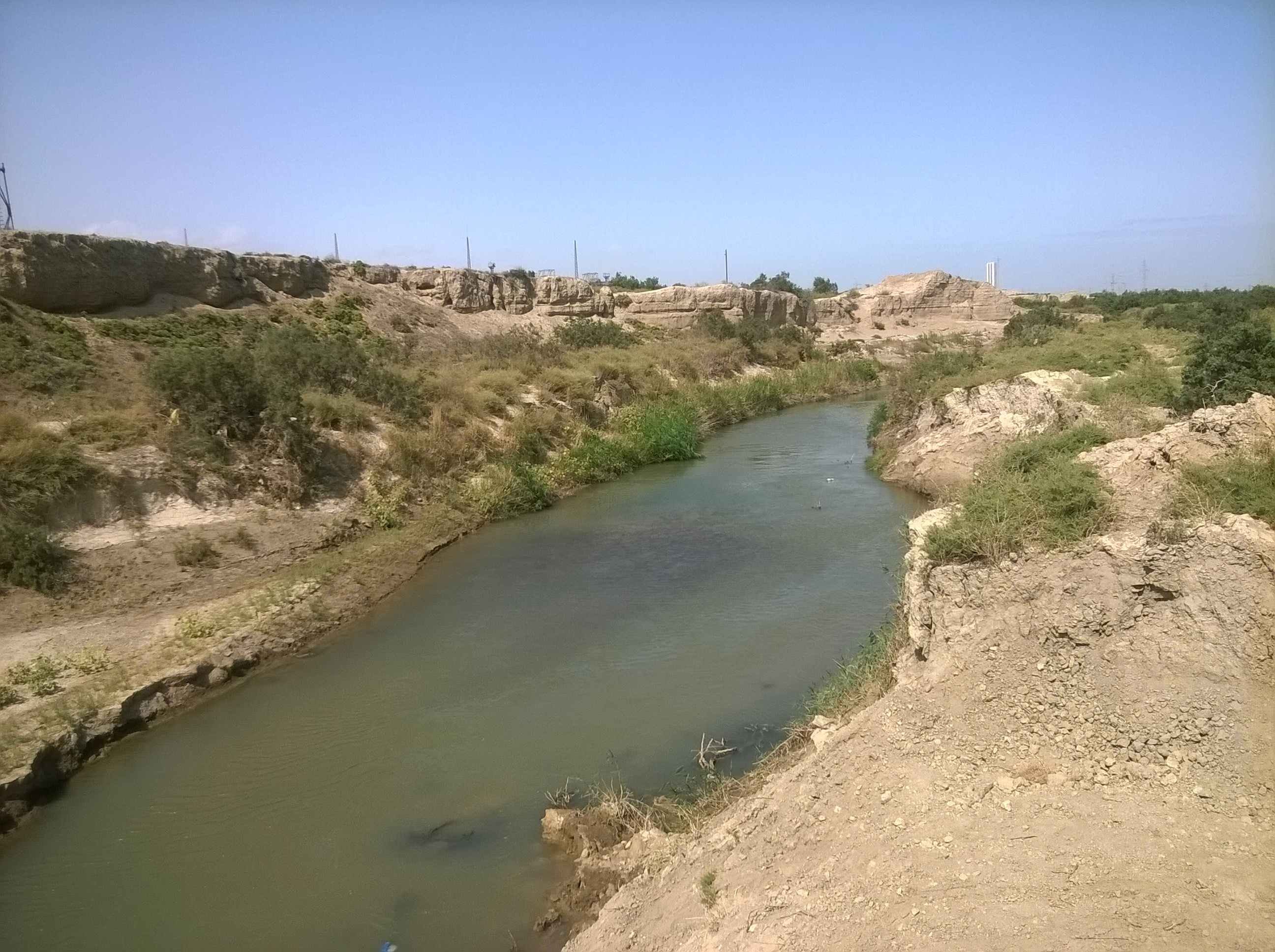

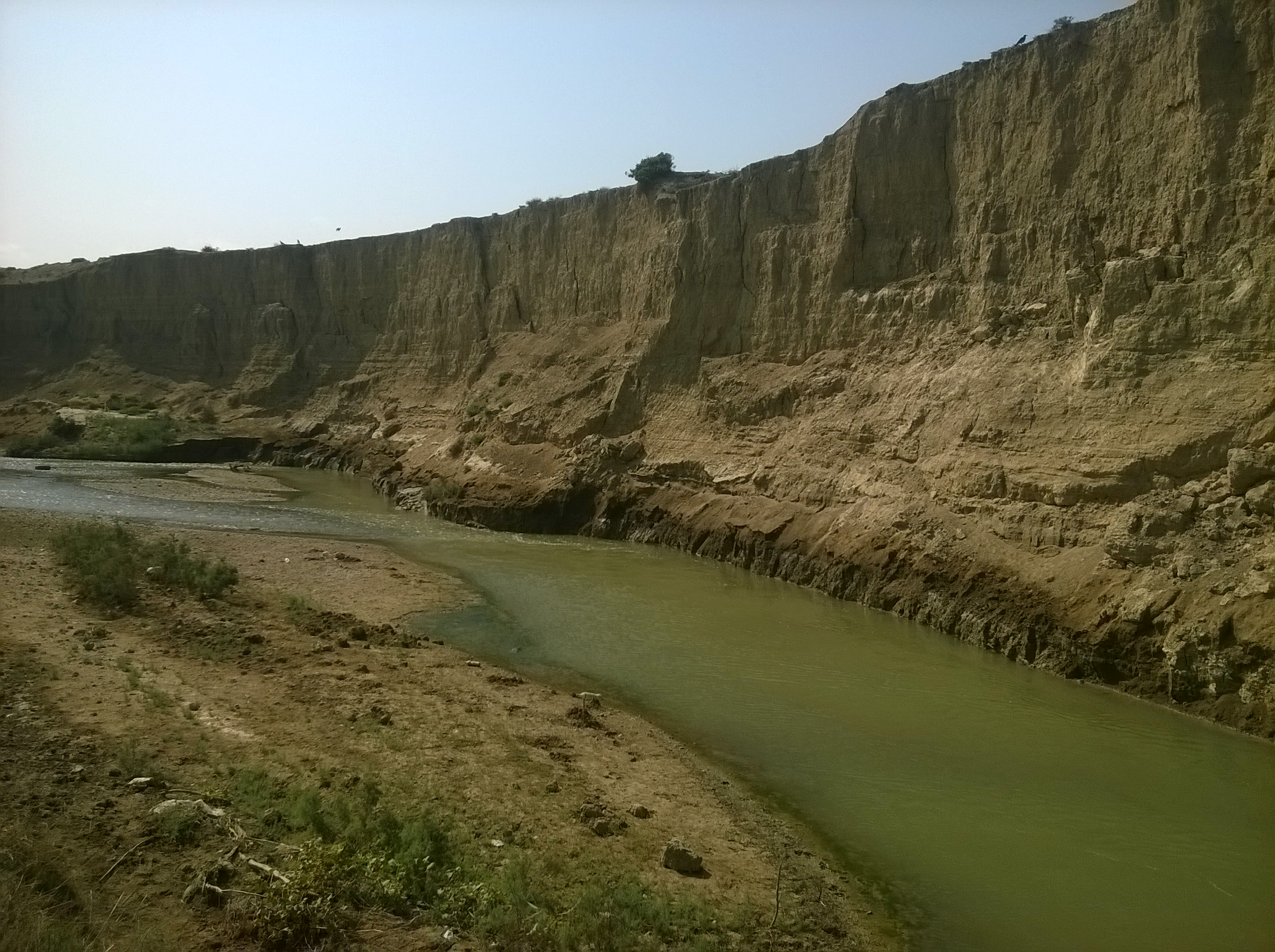

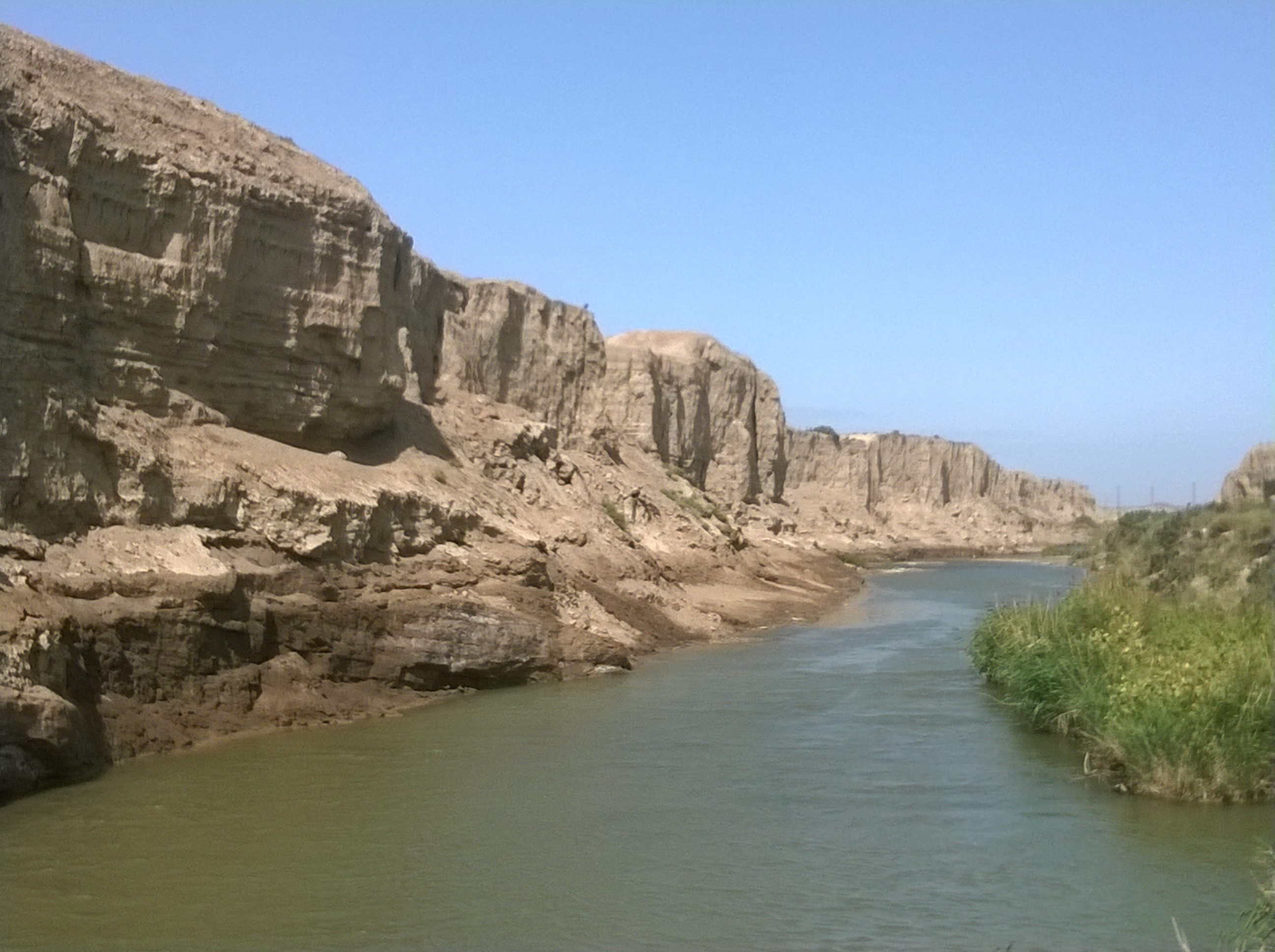

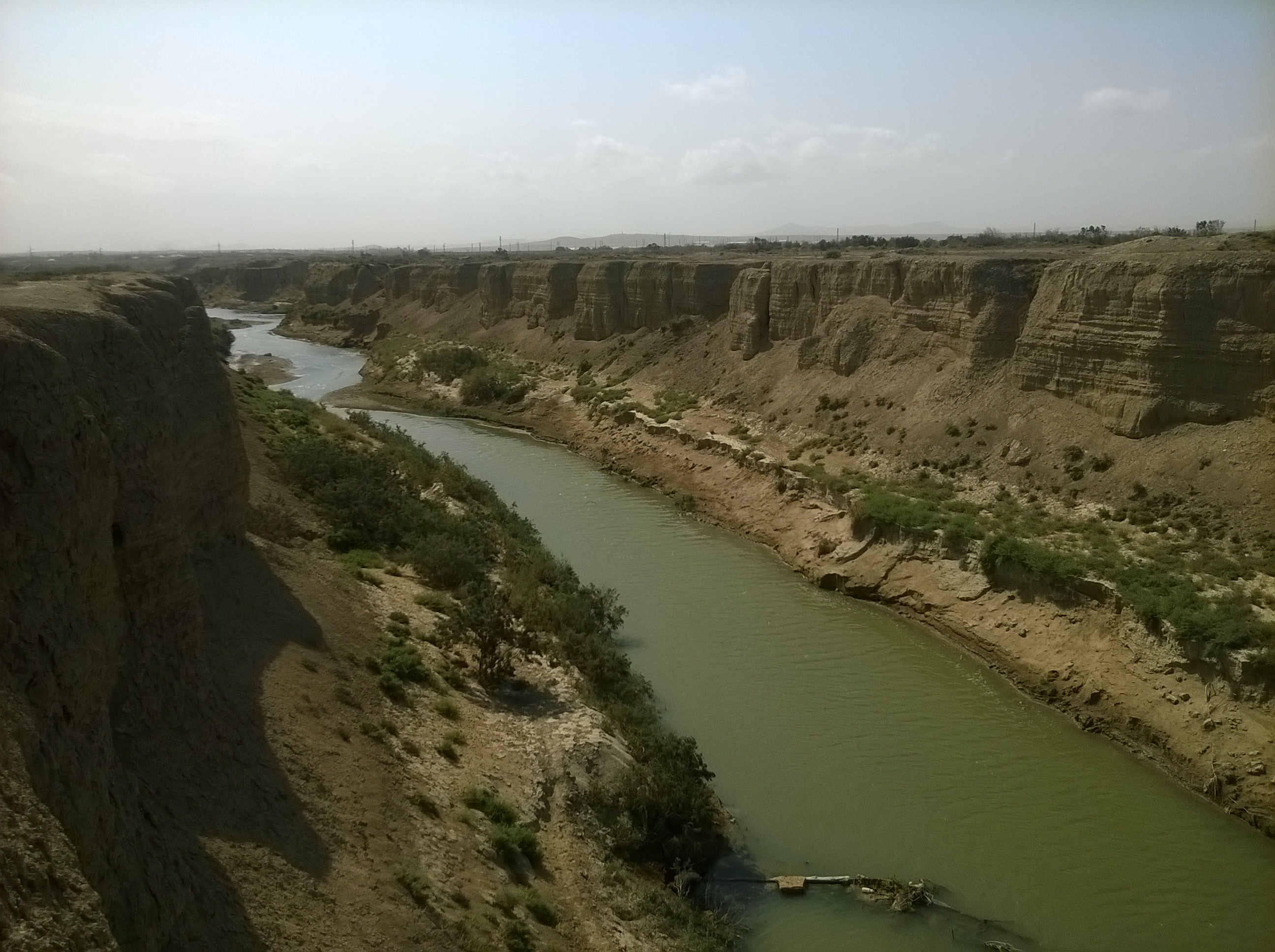
