= Khasanov =

Khasanov or Khassanov, feminine: Khasanova (Kazakh: Хасанов, Russian: Хасанов, Tajik: Хасанов, Tatar: Хәсәнов, Uzbek: Xasanov) is a surname from Eastern Europe and Middle Asia, a variant of Hasanov. Notable people with the surname include:

== People ==
- Abdusalom Khasanov, amateur boxer from Tajikistan
- Adlan Khasanov
- Aida Khasanova (1983–2023), Uzbekistani fencer and international fencing referee
- Akmal Khasanov
- Elvira Khasanova (born 2000), Russian racewalking athlete of Tatar descent
- Fliura Khasanova (born 1964), Kazakhstani chess player and grandmaster
- Ibragim Khasanov (1937–2010), Soviet sprint canoer
- Khurshed Khasanov
- Mukhriddin Khasanov
- Murat Khasanov (born 1970), Russian sambist and judoka
- Numon Khasanov (born 1971), Uzbekistani football player and manager
- Roman Khassanov (born 1996), Kazakhstani tennis player
- Rushan Khasanov (born 1956), Soviet footballer
- Sirojiddin Khasanov
- Sadriddin Khasanov
