= Amir Gasanov =

Russian footballer

Personal information
- Full name: Amir Ubaydalavovich Gasanov
- Date of birth: 12 April 1987 (age 39)
- Place of birth: Makhachkala, Russian SFSR
- Height: 1.94 m (6 ft 4 1/2 in)
- Position: Defender

Senior career*
Years	Team	Apps	(Gls)
2003–2005	FC Dynamo Makhachkala	6	(0)
2006	FC Anzhi-2 Makhachkala (amateur)		
2007	FC Dagdizel Kaspiysk (amateur)		
2008–2012	FC Dagdizel Kaspiysk	61	(0)
- * Club domestic league appearances and goals

Amir Ubaydalavovich Gasanov (Russian: Амир Убайдалавович Гасанов; born 12 April 1987) is a former Russian professional football player.

== Club career ==
He made his Russian Football National League debut for FC Dynamo Makhachkala on 28 August 2004 in a game against FC Oryol. That was his only season in the FNL.
