= Hasanlı, Jabrayil =

Hasanlı
- Location within Azerbaijan
- Coordinates: 39°12′15″N 47°02′47″E
- Country: Azerbaijan
- District: Jabrayil
- Time zone: UTC+4 (AZT)
  - Summer (DST): UTC+5 (AZT)

Hasanlı (Azerbaijani: Həsənli) is a village in Soltanly administrative-territorial unit of Jabrayil district, Azerbaijan, located on Araz plain, 20 km south to the city of Jabrayil.

== Toponym ==
According to a local legend, the village was founded by a man named Hasan, the son of Jabrayil, who lived in the 16th century. The village bears the name of its founder. The local population also called the village Hasanly.

== History ==
During the years of the Russian Empire, the village of Hasanly was part of Jabrayil district of Elizavetpol province.

After Soviet occupation, Hasanly was part of the village council of the same name in Jabrayil district of Azerbaijan SSR.

As an aftermath of the Karabakh War in August 1993, It was occupied by the Armenian forces in 1993.

On 19 October 2020, was announced the liberation by Azerbaijani Army of the village of Hasanly.

== Population ==
According to the “Code of statistical data of the Transcaucasian region population, extracted from the family lists of 1886,” in the village of Hasanly, Kovshutli rural district, Jabrayil district, there were 24 dym and lived 98 Azerbaijanis (listed as “Tatars”), who were Shiites by religion and peasants.

According to the “Caucasian Calendar” for 1912, 236 people lived in the village of Hasanly, Karyagin district, most were Azerbaijanis, listed as “Tatars”.

According to the publication “Administrative Division of the ASSR”, prepared in 1933 by the Department of National Economic Accounting of the Azerbaijan SSR (AzNEA), as of 1 January 1933, in the village of Hasanly, which was part of the Soltanly village council of the Jabrayil district of Azerbaijan SSR, there were 34 households and 197 residents. 94.9% of the population of village council were Azerbaijanis (in the source listed as “Turks”).
