= Namig Hasanov =

Azerbaijani footballer (born 1979)

Namiq Həsənov
Personal information
- Date of birth: 20 October 1979 (age 47)
- Height: 1.73 m (5 ft 8 in)
- Position: Midfielder

International career
Years	Team	Apps	(Gls)
2001–2003	Azerbaijan	3	(0)

Namig Hasanov (Azerbaijani: Namiq Həsənov) (born 20 October 1979) is an Azerbaijani football player. He has played for Azerbaijan national team.

== National team statistics ==
Azerbaijan national team
Year	Apps	Goals
2001	2	0
2002	0	0
2003	1	0
Total	3	0
