= Mohammed Hasanov =

National Hero of Azerbaijan

- Born: August 9, 1959; Qarasüleymanlı, Goranboy District, Azerbaijan SSR
- Died: November 18, 2020; Ganja
- Military career
- Allegiance: Republic of Azerbaijan
- Rank: Lieutenant colonel
- Conflicts: First Nagorno-Karabakh War
- Awards: National Hero of Azerbaijan; 1992

Mohammed Alasgar oglu Hasanov (Azerbaijani: Məhəmməd Həsənov) (9 August 1959, Qarasuleymanli village, Goranboy District, Azerbaijan SSR - 18.11.2020, Ganja) is the National Hero of Azerbaijan and warrior during the Nagorno-Karabakh conflict.

== Early life and education ==
Hasanov was born on August 9, 1959, in Qarasuleymanli village of Goranboy District of Azerbaijan SSR. In 1966, he completed his secondary education at Qarasuleymanli village secondary school No. 3. From 1977 through 1979, Hasanov served in the Soviet Armed Forces. After completing his military service, he moved to Kiev. In 1980, he entered Kyiv technical school of radioelectronics. After the graduation, he started working for "Communist" factory. In 1987, he returned to Azerbaijan and started to work as a teacher at Qarasuleymanli village secondary school No. 3.

=== Personal life ===
Hasanov was married and had four children.

== First Nagorno-Karabakh War ==
When the First Nagorno-Karabakh War started, Hasanov was assigned a commander of the battalion consisted of volunteers from different parts of Azerbaijan. He participated in battles around the villages of Manashid, Erkech, Karachinar and Talış.

After the abolishment of his battalion, he continued his military service in one of the military units. In 1993, Hasanov graduated from Baku Higher Command School. Since 2002, he has been working in Veyisli village secondary school in Goranboy District and currently is the director of the school where he studied.

== Honors ==
Mohammed Alasgar oglu Hasanov was awarded the title of the "National Hero of Azerbaijan" by Presidential Decree No. 6 dated 23 June 1992.

== See also ==
- First Nagorno-Karabakh War
- List of National Heroes of Azerbaijan

== Sources ==
- Vugar Asgarov. Azərbaycanın Milli Qəhrəmanları (Yenidən işlənmiş II nəşr). Bakı: "Dərələyəz-M", 2010, səh. 112–113.
