= Həsənli, Tovuz =

Hasanli
- Municipality
- Azerbaijani: Həsənli
- Location within Azerbaijan
- Coordinates: 40°40′08″N 45°33′09″E
- Country: Azerbaijan
- District: Tovuz

Population
  - Total: 988
- Time zone: UTC+4 (AZT)
  - Summer (DST): UTC+5 (AZT)

Həsənli (also, Hasanli) is a village and municipality in the Tovuz District of Azerbaijan. It has a population of 988. The municipality consists of the villages of Həsənli and Məşədivəlilər.
