= Həsənli, Barda =

Hasanli
- Municipality
- Azerbaijani: Həsənli
- Location within Azerbaijan
- Coordinates: 40°22′N 47°11′E
- Country: Azerbaijan
- District: Barda

Population
  - Total: 273
- Time zone: UTC+4 (AZT)
  - Summer (DST): UTC+5 (AZT)

Həsənli (also, Hasanli) is a village and municipality in the Barda District of Azerbaijan. It has a population of 273.
