= Həsənli, Jalilabad =

Hasanli
- Municipality
- Azerbaijani: Həsənli
- Location within Azerbaijan
- Coordinates: 39°10′N 48°23′E
- Country: Azerbaijan
- District: Jalilabad

Population
  - Total: 256
- Time zone: UTC+4 (AZT)
  - Summer (DST): UTC+5 (AZT)

Həsənli (also, Hasanli and Hasanly) is a village and municipality in the Jalilabad District of Azerbaijan. It has a population of 256.
