= Həsənli, Salyan =

Həsənli (also, Hasanli) is a village and municipality in the Salyan District of Azerbaijan. It has a population of 1,855.
