= Həsənli, Masally =

Hasanli
- Municipality
- Azerbaijani: Həsənli
- Location within Azerbaijan
- Coordinates: 39°06′45″N 48°42′11″E
- Country: Azerbaijan
- District: Masally

Population
  - Total: 2,539
- Time zone: UTC+4 (AZT)
  - Summer (DST): UTC+5 (AZT)

Həsənli (also, Hasanli) is a village and municipality in the Masally District of Azerbaijan. It has a population of 2,539.
