= Həsənli, Sabirabad =

Hasanli
- Municipality
- Azerbaijani: Həsənli
- Location within Azerbaijan
- Coordinates: 40°03′28″N 48°28′58″E
- Country: Azerbaijan
- District: Sabirabad

Population
  - Total: 881
- Time zone: UTC+4 (AZT)
  - Summer (DST): UTC+5 (AZT)

Həsənli (also, Hasanli) is a village and municipality in the Sabirabad District of Azerbaijan. It has a population of 881.
