= Sumgait =

Sumgait Sumqayıt
- City
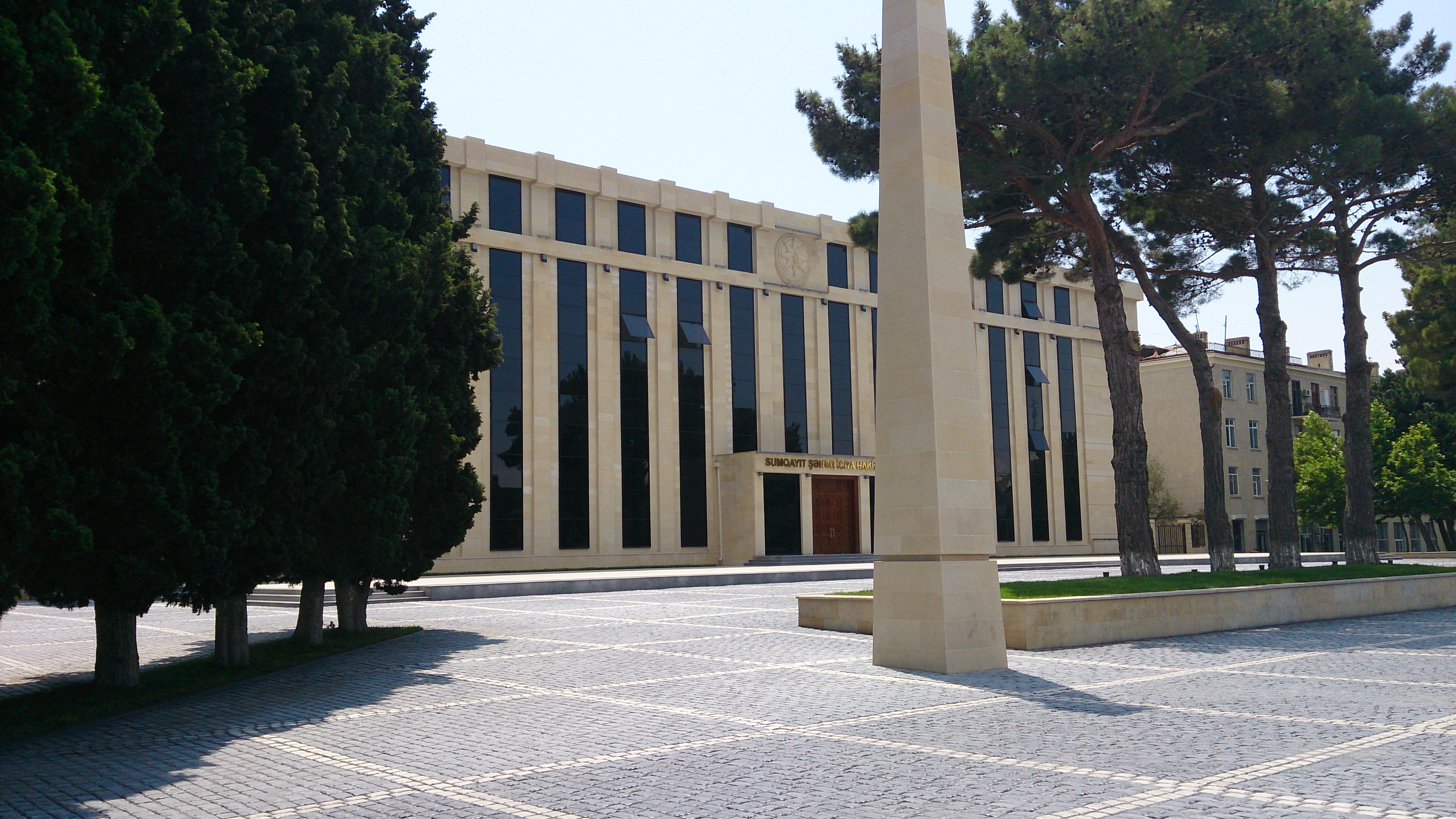
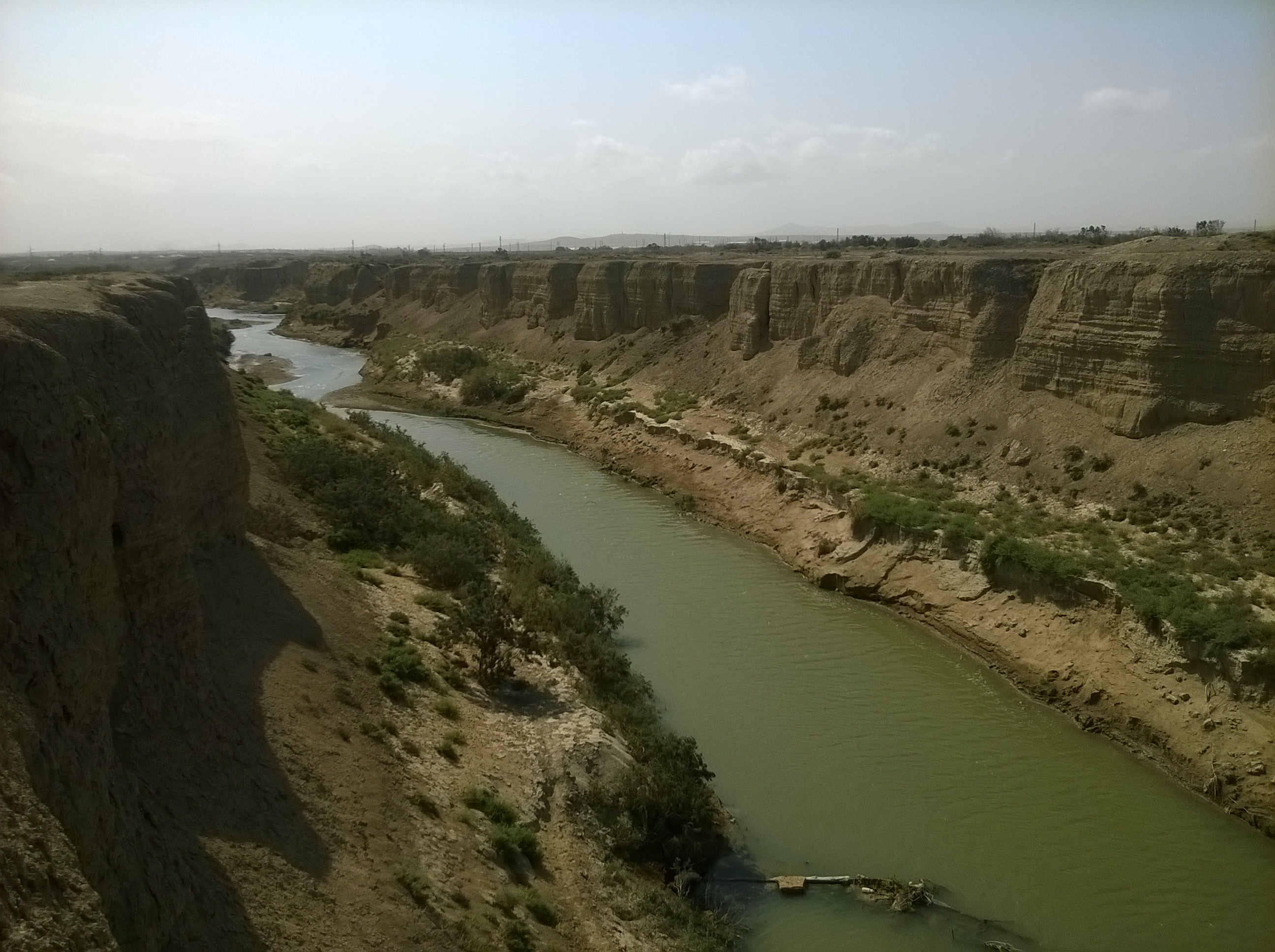
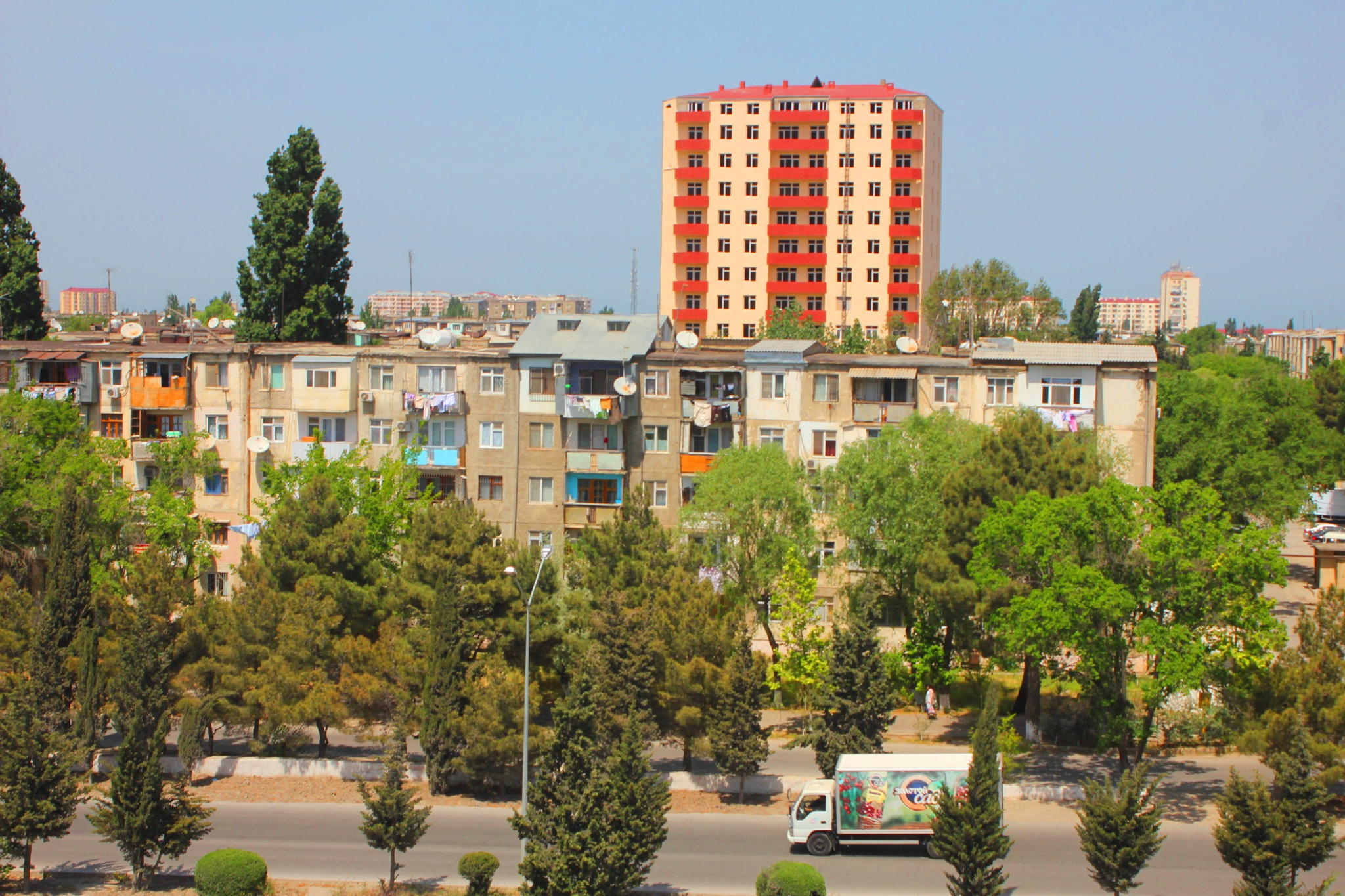
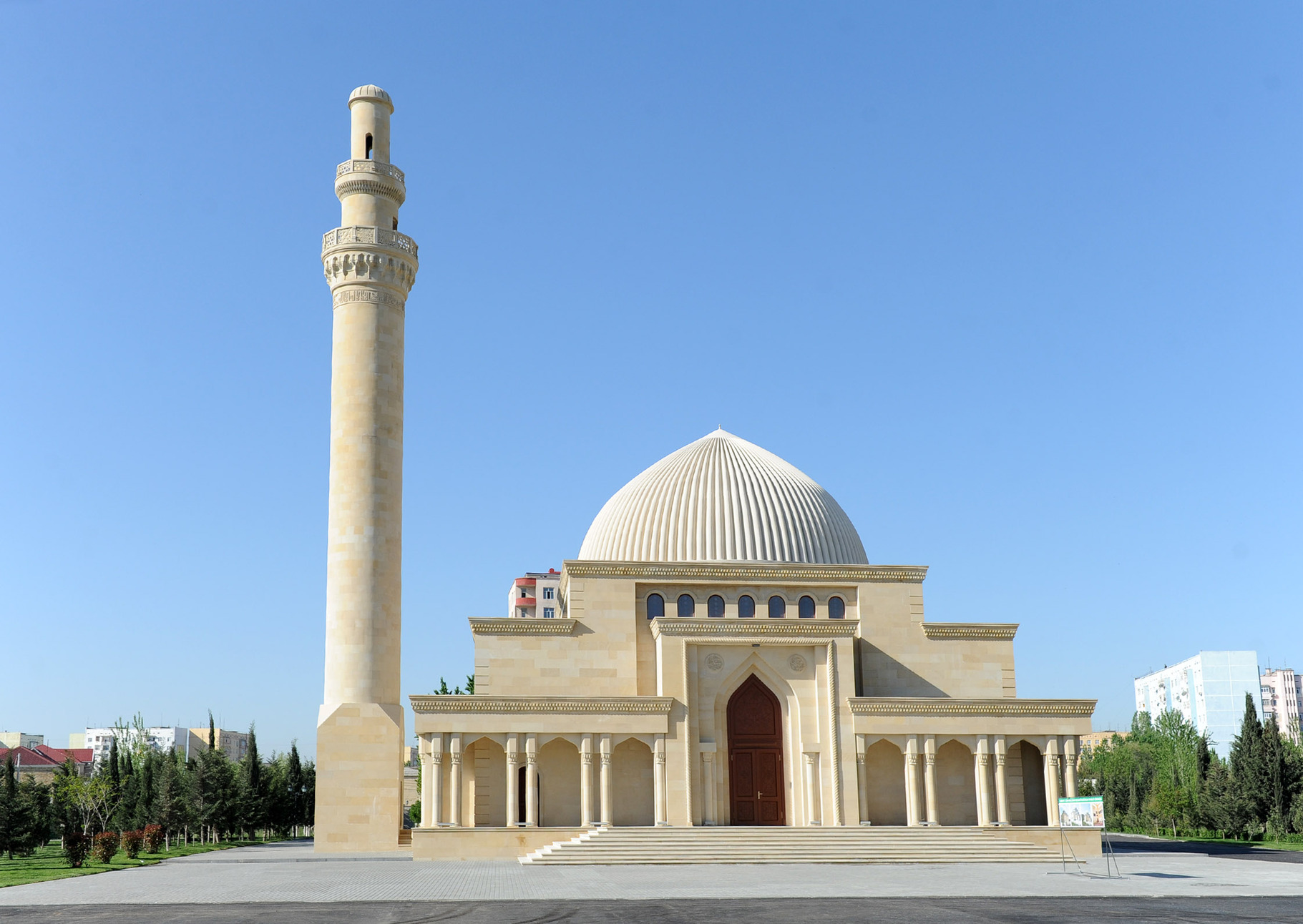
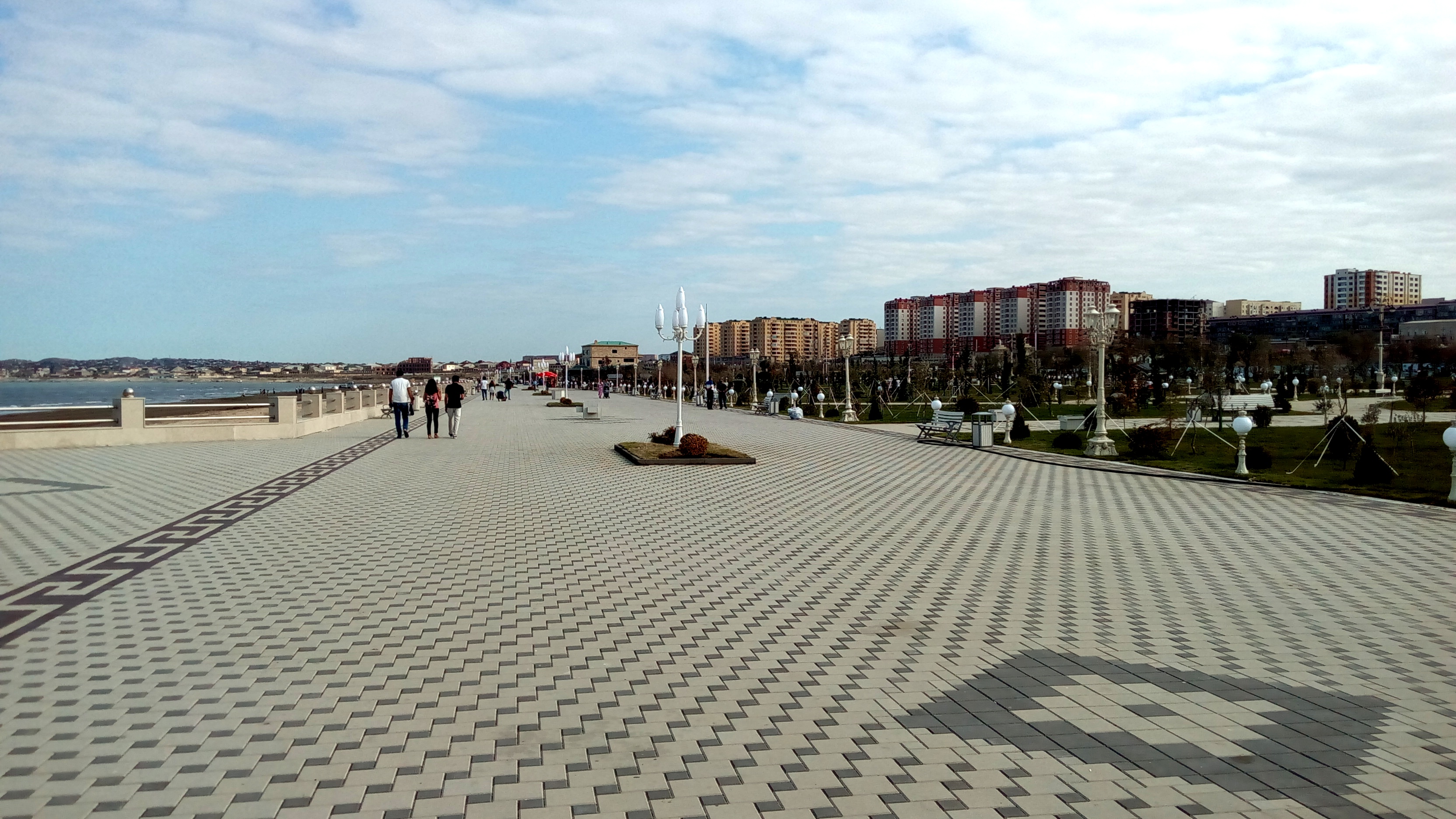
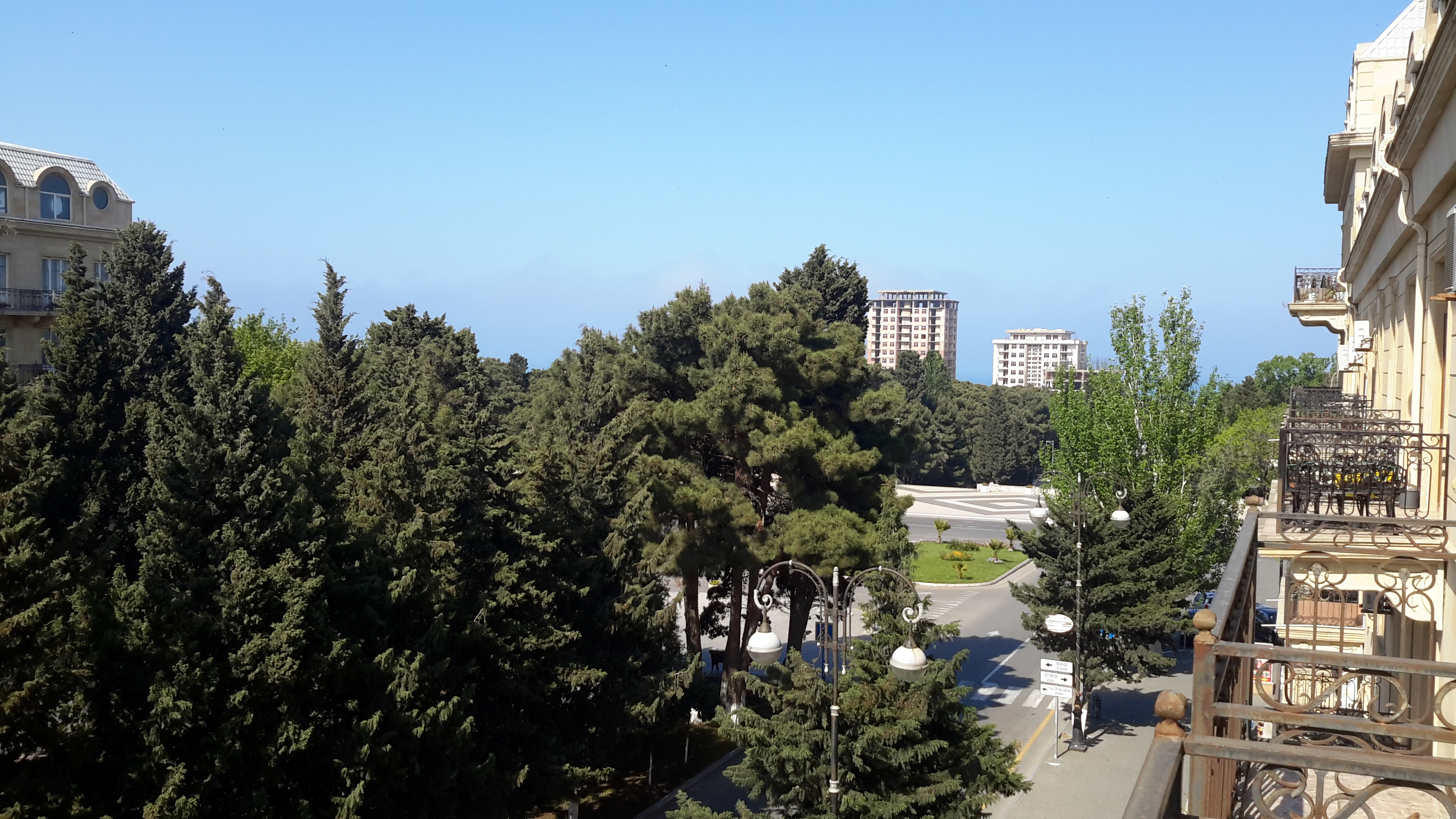
- Chemist Palace of Culture New buildings in Sumgait Sumgait City Executive Power Sumgait Canyon 8th Microdistrict Juma Mosque Sumgayit State Musical Drama Theater Mehdi Huseynzade Sumgait City Stadium Sumgait Boulevard View of Sumgait

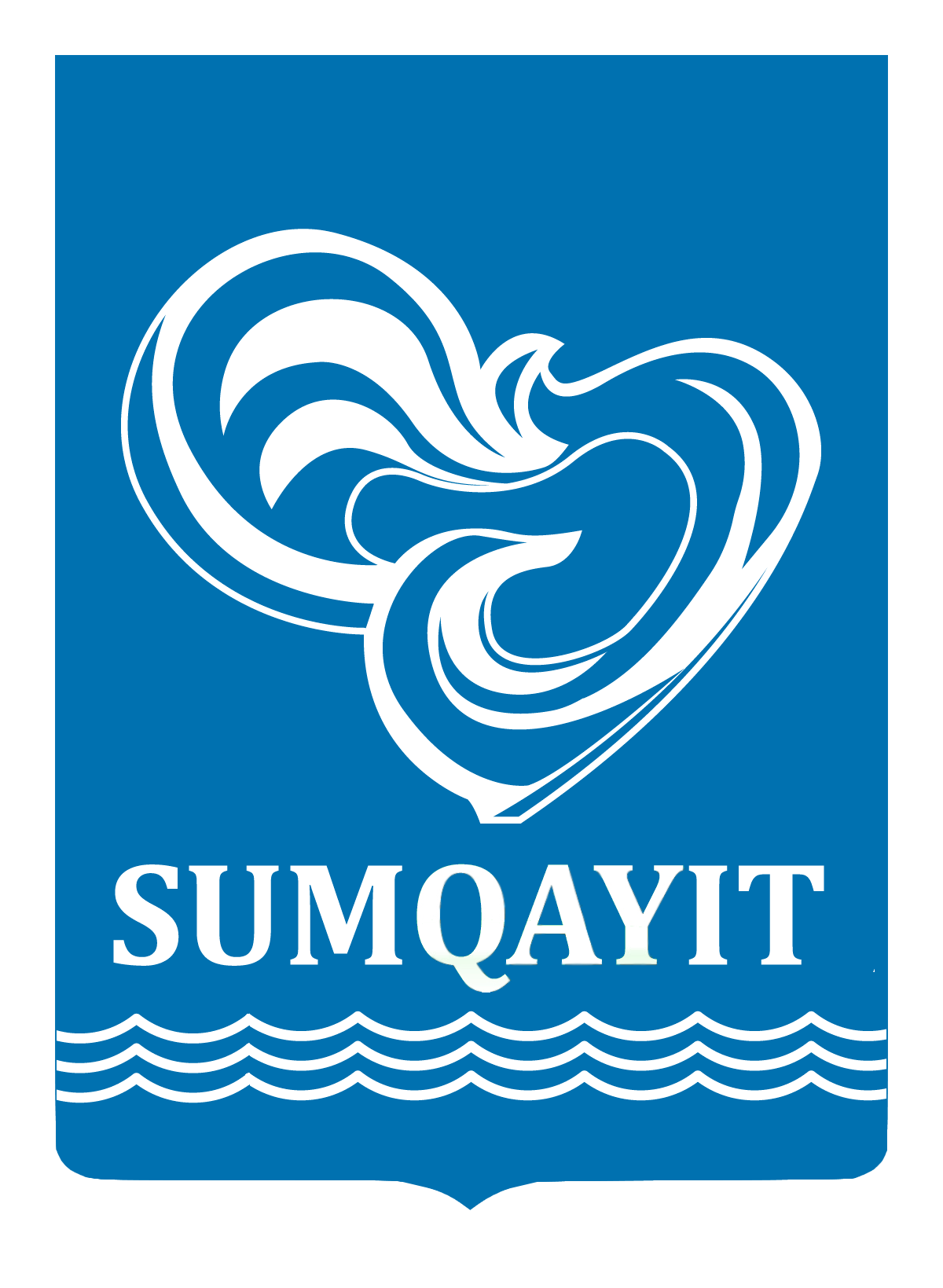
- Coat of arms
- Nickname: City of Youth (Gənclər şəhəri)

- Location within Azerbaijan
- Coordinates: 40°35′46″N 49°40′12″E
- Country: Azerbaijan
- Region: Absheron-Khizi
- Founded: 22 November 1949

Government
  - Mayor: Zakir Farajov

Area
  - Total: 90 km^{2} (35 sq mi)
- Elevation: 26 m (85 ft)

Population (2023)
  - Total: 427,000
  - Density: 4,700/km^{2} (12,000/sq mi)
  - Population Rank in Azerbaijan: 2nd
- Time zone: UTC+4 (AZT)
- Postal code: AZ5000
- Area code: +994 18
- ISO 3166 code: AZ-SM
- Vehicle registration: 50
- Website: www.sumqayit-ih.gov.az

Sumgait, also spelled Sumgayit or Sumqayit; /ˌsuːmɡɑːˈiːt/; (Azerbaijani: Sumqayıt, Azerbaijani: [sumɡɑˈjɯt]) is a city in Azerbaijan, located near the Caspian Sea, on the Absheron Peninsula, about 31 kilometres (19 miles) away from the capital Baku. The city had a population of 427,000 at the beginning of 2024, making it the second largest city in Azerbaijan after Baku.

The city has a territory of 83 square kilometres (32 sq mi). It was founded as a suburb of Baku in 1944 and received city status on 22 November 1949, growing into a major industrial center during the Soviet period. The municipality of Sumgait also includes the settlements of Jorat and Haji Zeynalabdin. It is home to Sumqayit State University.

== Etymology ==
The name of the city comes from the name of the Mongol tribe Sugaut (Sagait).

According to local folklore, the city is named after the Sumgait River. One folk legend tells the tale of a hero by the name of "Sum", who is chosen by the community to fight a monster that was blocking the Sumgait River. Sum eventually manages to kill the monster, but when the river is released, he is swept away by the waters and never seen again. After that, his beloved, Jeyran, inconsolable due to Sum's disappearance, would go to the river and cry "Sum qayıt!" (which means "Sum, come back!" in Azerbaijani). So the river became known as Sumgait, after which the city was named.

== History ==
=== Medieval era ===
According to historians, Medean tribes lived in the area in ancient times. During the construction boom, when the foundation of the executive power building was being excavated, remains of an ancient caravanserai along with personal items and kitchenware was found at the site.

The first reports of settlements at the present site of Sumgait were in 1580, when English traveler H. Barrow mentioned Sumgait in his writings, and in 1858, when Alexandre Dumas wrote about the area in his memoirs Trip to Caucasus, although nothing substantial was created on the site until the Soviet Union gained control over the area in the 1920s.

=== Soviet period ===
Following the politics of glasnost, initiated by Mikhail Gorbachev, civil unrest and ethnic strife grew in various regions of the Soviet Union, including Nagorno-Karabakh, an autonomous region of the Azerbaijani SSR.

The Sumgait pogrom against the local Armenian population on 27–29 February 1988 was one of the first violent events of the Nagorno-Karabakh conflict. It killed more than 30 people, wounded some 200, and produced thousands of refugees; most of the victims were Armenians who constituted a large minority of the population.

=== Republic era ===
After the First Nagorno-Karabakh War, the city became home to a number of Azerbaijani refugees internally displaced persons, mainly from Qubadli and Zengilan regions. In 1994, Heydar Aliyev initiated a large-scale Free Economic Area project on the territory of the city.

== Geography ==
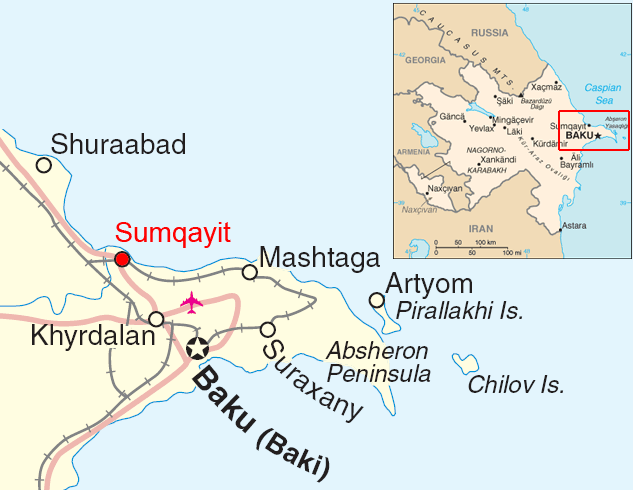
Sumgait is located about 31 km (19 mi) (approximately 20 miles) northwest of Azerbaijan's capital Baku, near the Caspian Sea.

=== Climate ===
Sumgait has a cold semi-arid climate (BSk) according to the Köppen climate classification.

Climate data for Sumgait
Month	Jan	Feb	Mar	Apr	May	Jun	Jul	Aug	Sep	Oct	Nov	Dec	Year
Mean daily maximum °C (°F)	6.7 (44.1)	6.3 (43.3)	9.8 (49.6)	17.0 (62.6)	22.5 (72.5)	27.6 (81.7)	30.7 (87.3)	32.0 (89.6)	26.0 (78.8)	19.5 (67.1)	15.9 (60.6)	9.3 (48.7)	18.6 (65.5)
Mean daily minimum °C (°F)	1.3 (34.3)	1.1 (34.0)	3.4 (38.1)	8.6 (47.5)	13.8 (56.8)	18.8 (65.8)	21.7 (71.1)	21.8 (71.2)	18.2 (64.8)	12.5 (54.5)	10.1 (50.2)	3.6 (38.5)	11.2 (52.2)
Average precipitation mm (inches)	24 (0.9)	20 (0.8)	23 (0.9)	40 (1.6)	36 (1.4)	31 (1.2)	14 (0.6)	14 (0.6)	21 (0.8)	33 (1.3)	32 (1.3)	25 (1.0)	313 (12.4)
Source: Climate-Data.org

=== Environment ===
As a result of the Soviet planning of the industrial boom era, the city became heavily polluted. Soon after Azerbaijan's independence, the industrial sectors went into decline. The Absheron Peninsula (which consists of Sumgait, Baku and the Absheron District) was considered by scientists to be the most ecologically devastated part of Azerbaijan. The city was known for its children's cemetery, known as the "Baby Cemetery" which contains many graves of infants born with deformities and intellectual disability that were further complicated by the lack of adequate medical care for the poor. Sumgait was named as the most polluted place on Earth by the U.S.-based environmental group the Blacksmith Institute in 2006 and placed on their list of The World's Most Polluted Places by Time magazine in 2007. The report noted the former Soviet industrial base was polluting the local environment with industrial chemicals like chlorine and heavy metals. The report also mentioned cancer rates in Sumgait were as much as 51% higher than the national average and that genetic mutations and birth defects were commonplace. The city administration prepared an environmental protection plan for 2003–2010 which has been steadily decreasing the levels of pollution to minimal. The program oversees 118 activities aimed at minimizing pollution at all possible levels of economic production. The program was prepared with the participation of all industrial enterprises in the city and its enforcement is being regulated by the executive power of the city. For instance, the amount of wastewater from industrial production went down from 600,000 m^{3} (21,000,000 cu ft) during the 1990s to 76,300 m^{3} (2,690,000 cu ft) in 2005. Solid waste went down from 300,000 to 3,868 tons a year. The World Bank has issued a loan to the Azerbaijani government for construction of a burial range for mercury waste.

== Administrative divisions ==
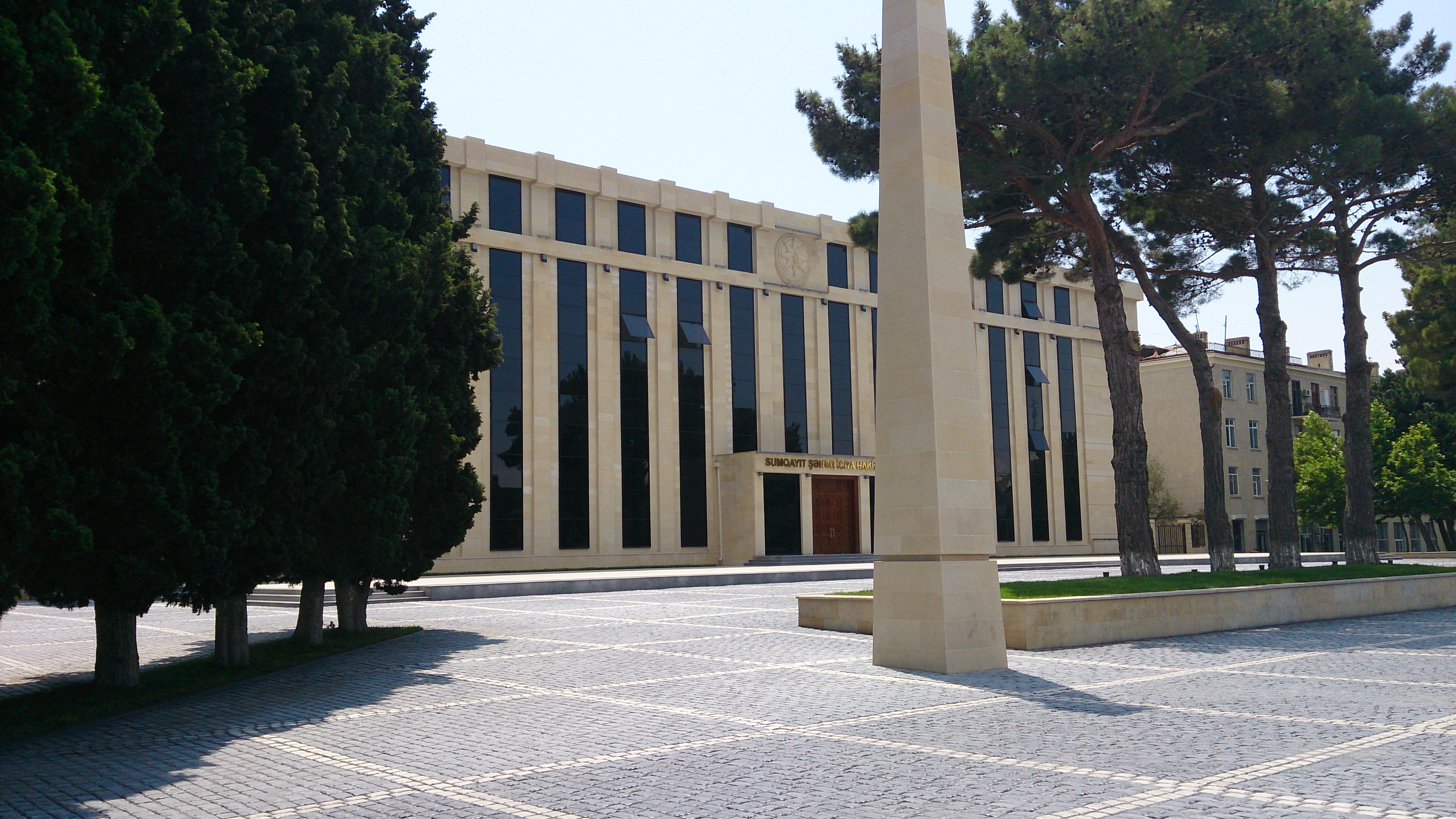
Building of Sumgait City Executive Power

The municipality of Sumgait consists of the city of Sumgait and the municipalities of Jorat and Haji Zeynalabdin. Executive power in the city is held by the mayor, presently Zakir Ferejov.

== Demographics ==
According to the State Statistics Committee, as of 2018, the population of city was 341,200 people, having increased by 84,500 (about 33 percent) from 256,700 people in 2000. The population consists of 168,300 men and 172,900 women. More than 23 percent of the population consists of young people and teenagers aged 14–29.

Population of the city (at the beginning of the year, thsd. persons)
Town	2000	2001	2002	2003	2004	2005	2006	2007	2008	2009	2010	2011	2012	2013	2014	2015	2016	2017	2018	2019	2020	2021
Sumgait town	285.4	287.5	289.4	291.0	292.3	294.5	296.7	299.6	302.7	308.4	311.7	314.8	318.7	325.2	329.3	332.9	336.2	339.0	341.2	343.1	345.3	346.4

=== Ethnic composition ===
Azerbaijanis comprise 85% of the population, Talysh 5%, Lezgins 5%, Russians 2%, Turkish 1%, and others 2%. Prior to February 1988, Sumgait was home to 20,000 Armenians, who were displaced as a result of the Sumgait pogrom.

=== Religion ===
Sumgait did not have a mosque until after the collapse of the Soviet Union. In the 2010s, the city emerged as a center for Salafism in Azerbaijan, a form of Sunni Islam that advocates a return to Islam's earliest practices. The Syrian Civil War and emergence of ISIL forced authorities to crack down on perceived religious radicals in Sumgait.

== Economy ==
In 1935, the Soviet government decided to develop heavy industry in the Absheron Peninsula, and the future location of Sumgait was chosen based on its proximity to Baku and its key position on the existing railroad lines.

Between 1938 and 1941, a thermal power station was constructed to power Baku's growing petroleum industry. This was soon followed by more heavy industries. Due to World War II the construction of the area stopped and resumed in 1944 when metallurgical and chemical plants were constructed and put into operation. The first production of Sumgait Chemical Plant led to a rapid growth and construction boom, creating a new job market, and a need for a resident population. In 1949, Sumgait gained official city status according to the resolution of the Supreme Soviet of Azerbaijan SSR. In 1952, a tube-rolling plant delivered its first produce thus developing black metallurgy production in Azerbaijan. The same year, another new Synthetic Rubber Production Plant started its operations producing ethylene obtained from oil. Operations at Sumgait Steel Processing Plant and Sumgait Aluminium Plant were commenced in 1953 and 1955, respectively. In 1957–1955, a number of scientific research facilities and cultural centres were built, leading to further development of the city infrastructure. In 1960, authorities started building the Petroleum Chemical Factory, the largest in Europe at the time. From 1961 through 1968, a brick-producing factory, a polymer construction materials industrial complex, a phosphor production plant were built. In the 1970–80s, light industry and mechanical engineering facilities were added to the industrial base of the city. By the end of the 1980s, Sumgait was already the centre of the chemical industry of the USSR.

After the dissolution of the Soviet Union, Sumgait has remained Azerbaijan's second-biggest industrial centre after Baku. Some of the most significant companies operating in the city are Azerpipe, Azeraluminium, Sumgait Aluminium, Sumgait Superphosphate, glass producer Khazar OJSC, Sumgait Knitted Goods Factory, and Sumgait Compressors, many of which have been privatized.

In 2011, the development of Sumgait Technologies Park (STP) and Sumgayit Chemical Industrial Park (SCIP) started to receive investor attention. The 167-hectare (410-acre) complex will host pharmaceutical, construction, and agricultural businesses, in addition to chemical, automotive, and electronics producers. It is meant as a self-sufficient complex, which will include residential facilities, an exhibition center, laboratories, sports center, schools, and hospitals. SCIP aims to attract domestic and foreign investors, and its management has already received proposals for 20 investment projects in the complex.

== Culture ==
Sumgait is known as the "City of Youth" due to its status as the youngest city in Azerbaijan. Sumgait was officially designated as the "Youth Capital" for 2025.The opening ceremony was held on 2 February 2025, jointly organised by the Ministry of Youth and Sports and the Sumgait City Executive Authority.

=== Architecture ===
The first studies in architecture and urban planning of the city of Sumgait were carried out by Azerbaijani and Soviet scientist, academician of the International Academy of Architecture of the Eastern Countries, honored architect of Azerbaijan SSR Kamal Mammadbeyov. The result of years of research were numerous scientific publications. His book "Sumgait: Architectural and planning development" is preserved and available in the Library of Congress of the USA. Mammadbeyov donated a large number of graphics and illustrations made by him to the archives of The City Museum. The Flag Museum in Sumgait was opened on 15 December 2017, with the participation of Ilham Aliyev.

New buildings in Sumgayit

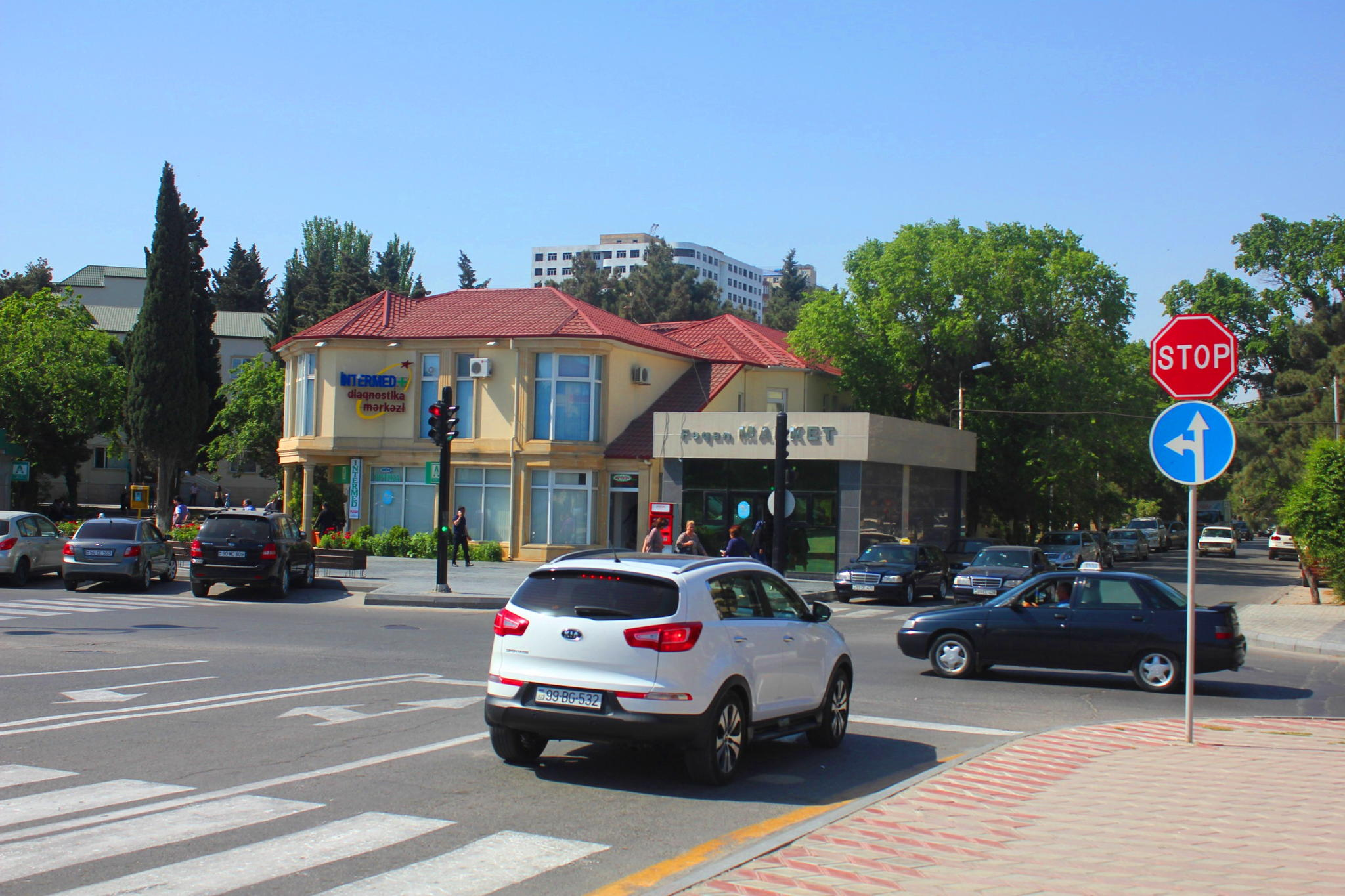
Haydar Aliyev Avenue in Sumgayit

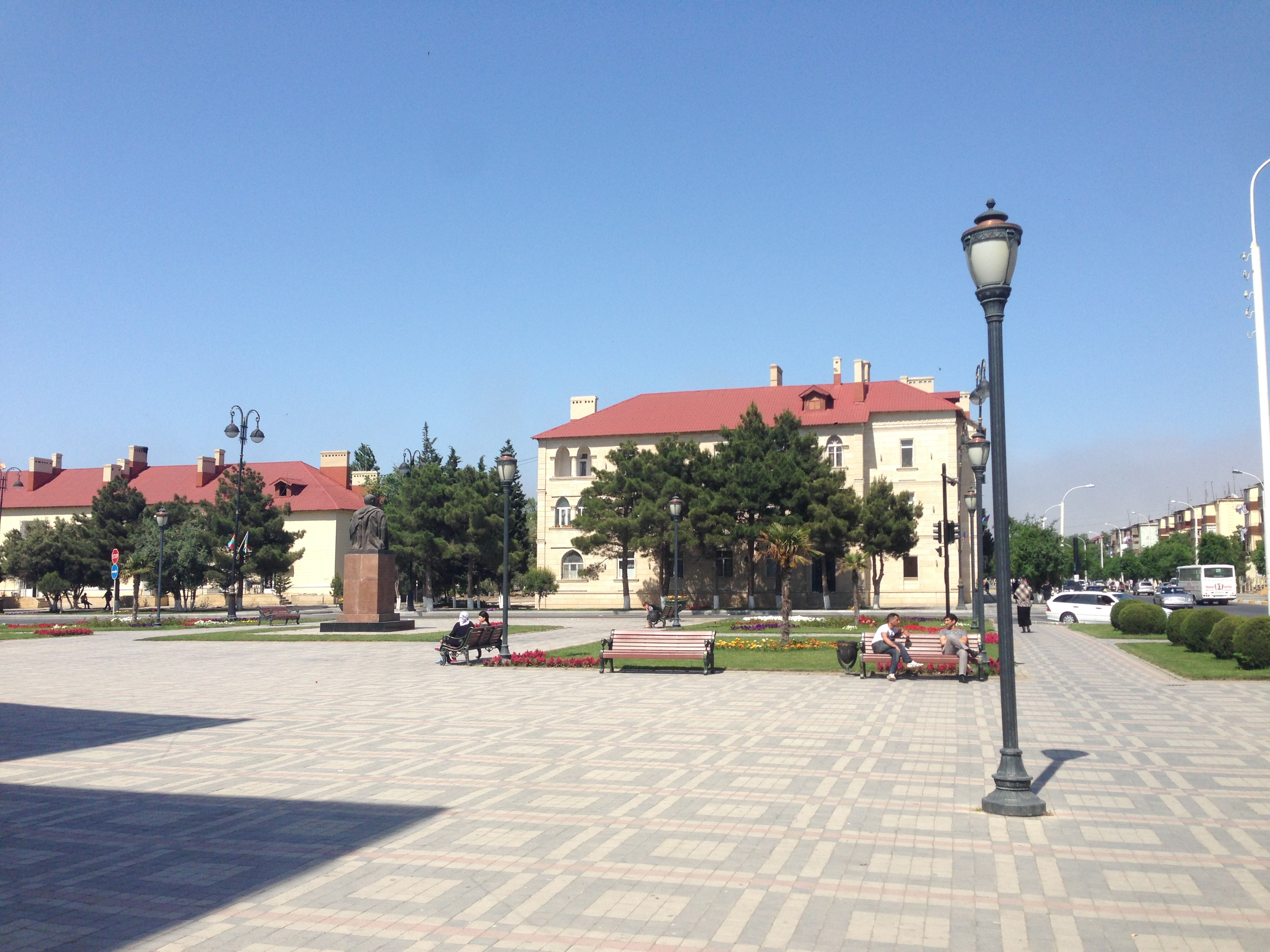
Residential buildings

=== Music and media ===
Sumgait was credited as the main regional driving force behind rock bands of the 1990s including Yuxu, Miraj, Mozalan, and Sirr.

The regional channel Dünya TV and newspaper 365 Gün are headquartered in the city.

In 2020, the Azerbaijan Jewish Media Center was established in Sumgayit.

=== Parks and gardens ===
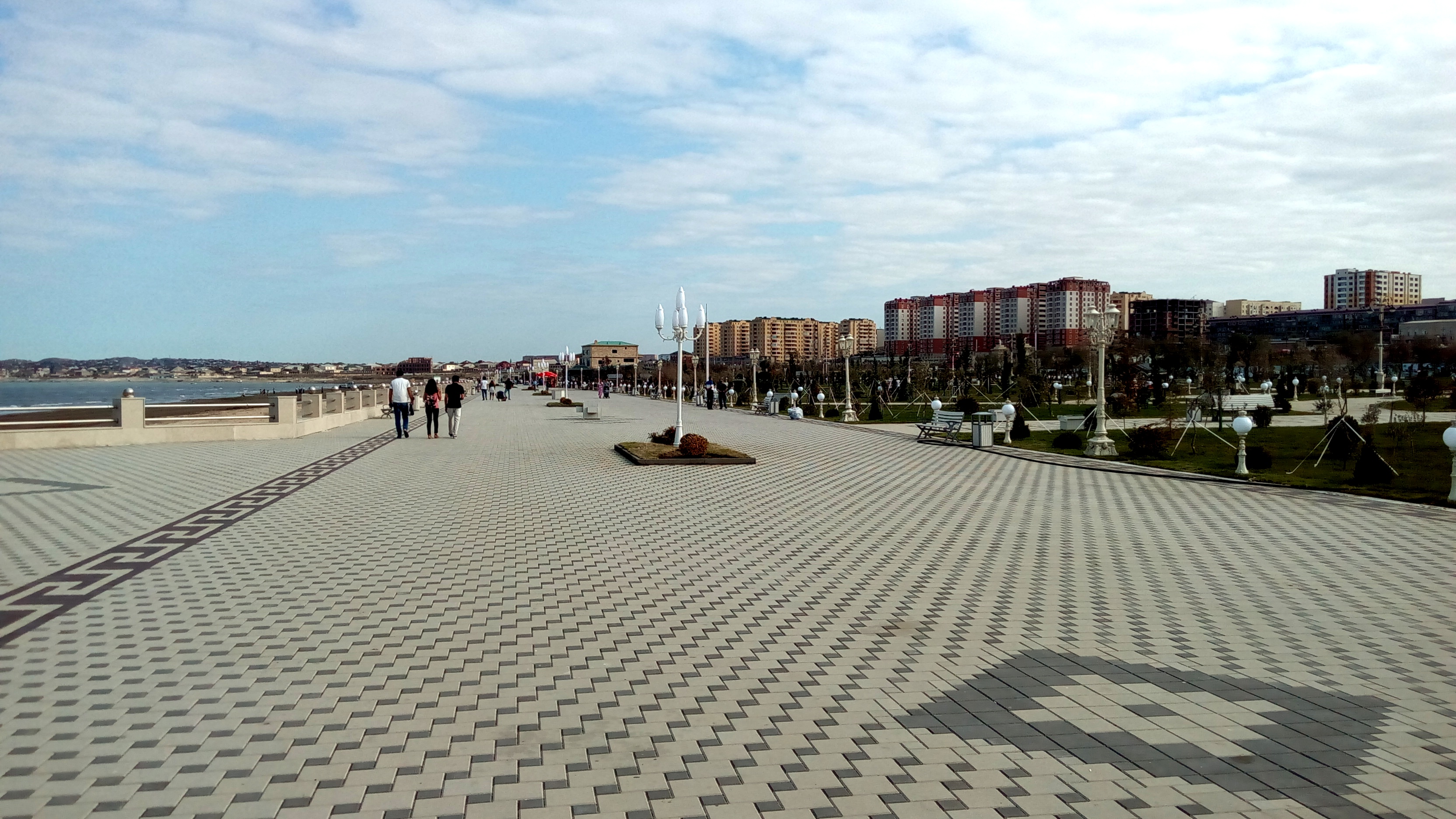
Sumgayit Boulevard

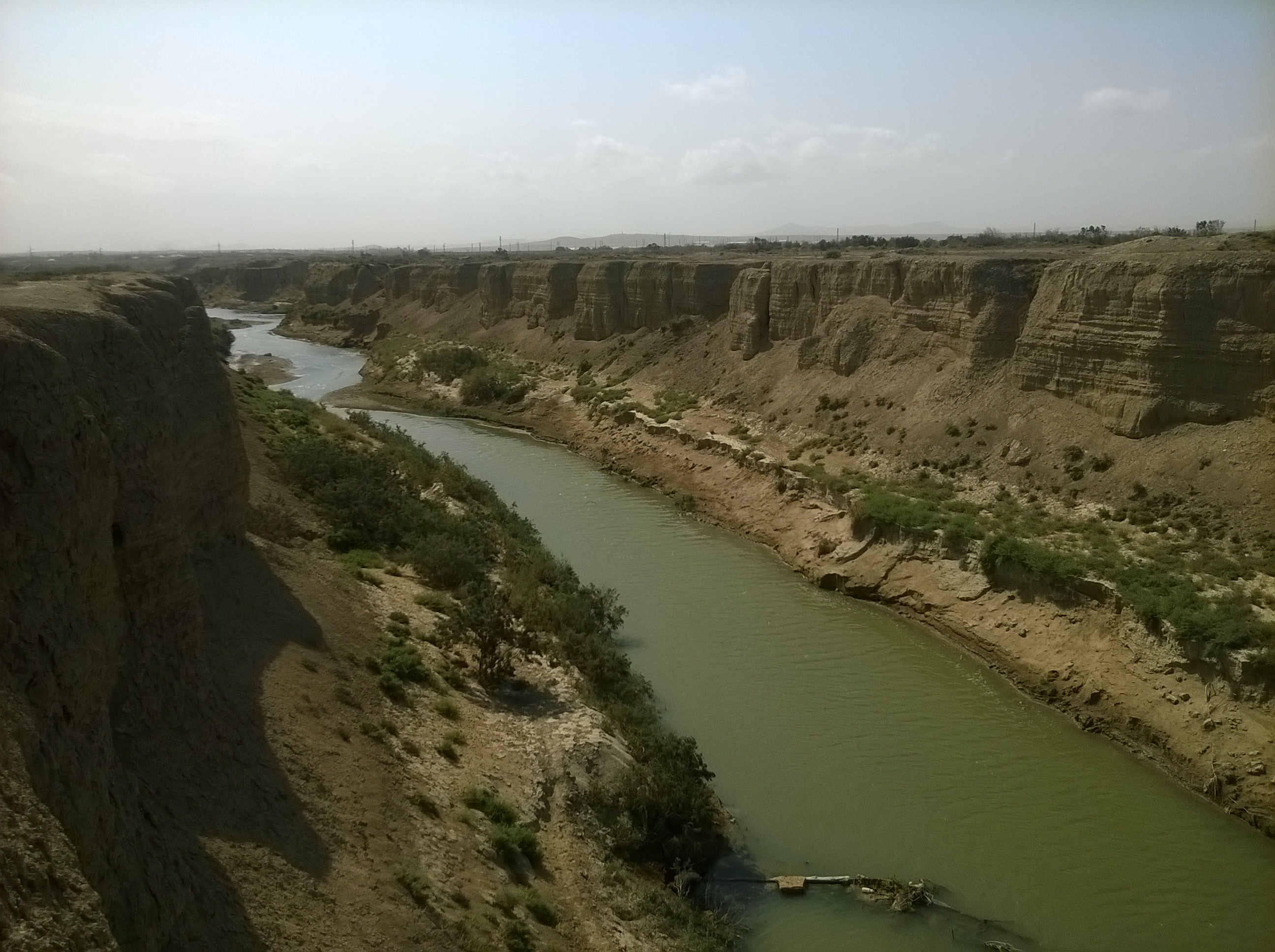
Sumgait Canyon

During the Soviet rule of Azerbaijan, Sumgait was believed to have the longest boulevard in the republic. The Culture and Leisure Park was laid on 23 hectares (57 acres) of Sumgait coastline in 1967. On 17 August 1978, the park was given the name of a distinguished Azerbaijani poet Imadaddin Nasimi. The same year, the city administration raised the Peace Dove sculpture and monument in the middle of the park assigning the city a symbol of peace.

The flora of the park includes 39 types of trees. Events of the 1990s, such as the Black January tragedy and First Nagorno-Karabakh War, led to the establishment of Stars (Ulduzlar) and 20 January Monument monuments in the park. In the eastern section of the park, Shehidler Khiyabani, similar to Martyrs' Lane in Baku, was established as a burial ground for thousands of soldiers from Sumgait who died during the war. According to Decree No. 132 of the Cabinet of Ministers of Azerbaijan dated 2 August 2001, the park was given the status of national historical importance. Its current size is 80 hectares (200 acres).

In addition to Nasimi Culture and Leisure Park, the city administration built Ludwigshafen Park in 1997 in celebration of the 20th anniversary of twin-city relations between Ludwigshafen and Sumgait. In 1999, Heydar Aliyev Park and Luna Park were built in the rapidly growing city.

=== Sports ===
Mehdi Huseynzade Sumqayit City Stadium

The city has one professional football team competing in the top-flight of Azerbaijani football – Sumgayit, currently playing in the Azerbaijan Premier League.

== Transportation ==
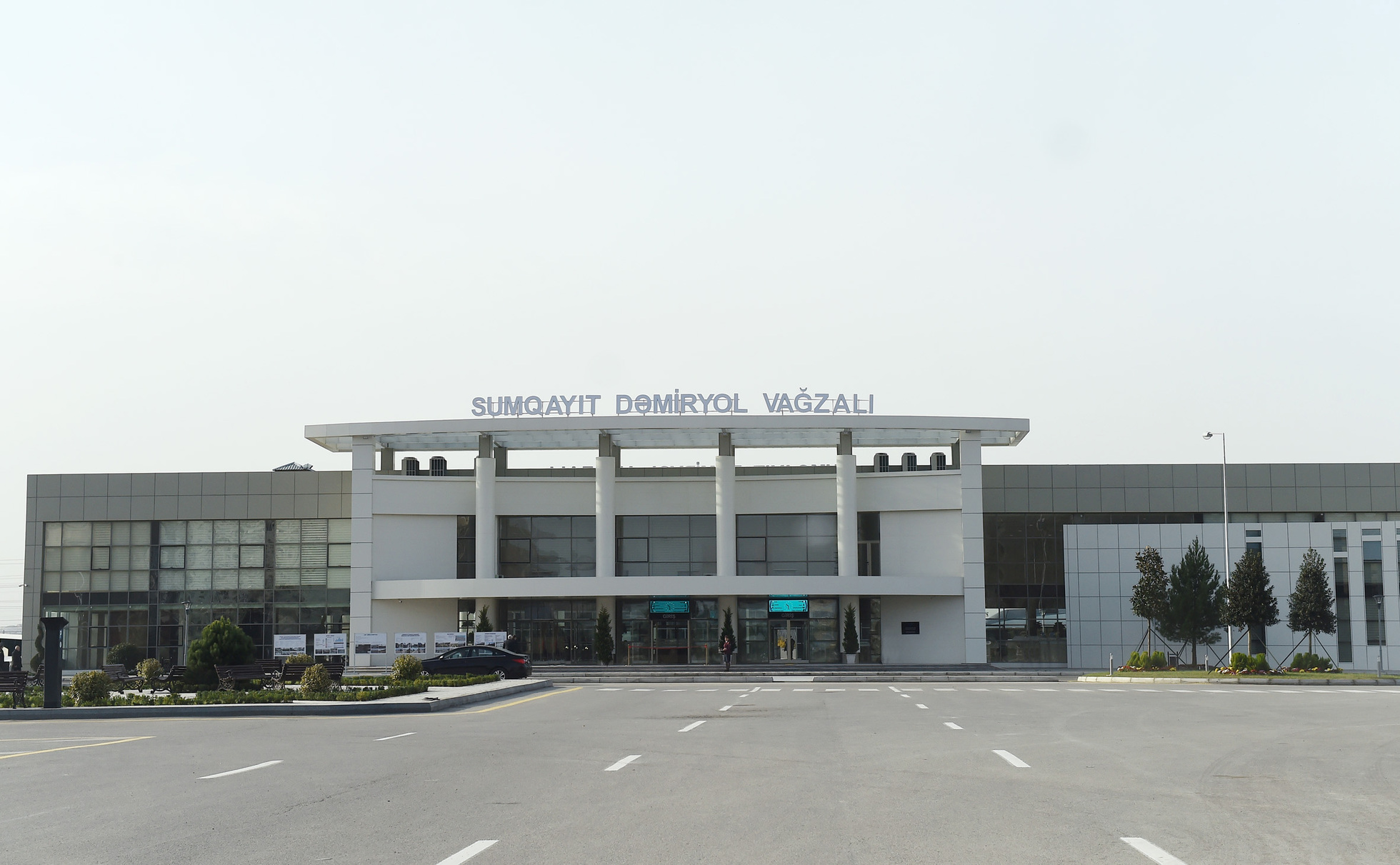
Sumgayit railway station

The city had a tram system that functioned from 1959 to 2003. Sumgait's trolleybus system at its height consisted of eight lines and existed until 2006. On 3 June 2015, in Baku, President of Azerbaijan Ilham Aliyev opened the reconstructed Baku-Sumgait Railway with trains of Baku suburban railway taking 40 minutes from Baku to Sumgait.

== Education ==
As of 2011, Sumgait boasted 49 schools, 13 vocational and music schools, Sumgait Private Turkish High School and a teachers' institute.

The only university in the city is Sumqayit State University. The university has seven departments and approximately 4000 students.

== Notable natives ==
The city's notable residents include the following people.

- Chess players
  - Shakhriyar Mamedyarov
  - Turkan Mamedyarova
  - Zeinab Mamedyarova
- Balaban player
  - Alihan Samedov
- Footballers
  - Kamal Guliyev
  - Ruslan Safarov
  - Mahir Shukurov
  - Nazim Suleymanov
- Judo
  - Ilham Zakiyev
- Karateka
  - Rafael Aghayev
- Mixed martial arts (MMA) fighters
  - Tural Rahimov
- Politics
  - Emin Huseynov
- Religion
  - Archbishop Pargev Martirosyan

== Twin towns and sister cities ==
Sumgait is twinned with the following cities:

- (Georgia (country)) Rustavi, Georgia, (since 1952)
- Cherkasy, Ukraine, (since 1972)
- Pitești, Romania, (since 1971)
- Ludwigshafen, Germany, (since 1977)
- Bari, Italy, (since 2004)
- Aktau, Kazakhstan, (since 2009)
- Mogilev, Belarus, (since 2009)
- Nevinnomyssk, Russia, (since 2011)
- Genoa, Italy, (since 2013)
- Zhuzhou, China
- Ceyhan, Turkey
