= Corat =

- Municipality
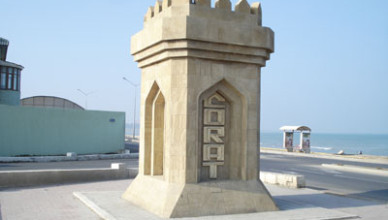

- Location within Azerbaijan
- Coordinates: 40°34′21″N 49°42′23″E
- Country: Azerbaijan
- City: Sumqayit

Population (2020)
  - Total: 13,700
- Time zone: UTC+4 (AZT)
  - Summer (DST): UTC+5 (AZT)

Corat (Ҹорат, جورات; also Jorat and Dzhorat) is a town and municipality in Sumqayit, Azerbaijan. Corat is located on the shore of the Caspian Sea. The village of Corat is located 35 km northwest of Baku, on the Western shore of the Caspian Sea, on a plain.

It has a population of 13700.

== Etymology ==
The name of settlement comes from the name of the Mongol tribe Joyrat.
