= List of current operating trolleybus systems =

Around 249 cities around the world have a trolleybus system currently operating. More than one third of those cities are in Russia and Ukraine, and more than half of the revenue lines are in those countries. Trolleybuses are still common in Central and Eastern Europe and China, while in the Western world they have mostly been replaced by buses and did not experience a resurgence since the late 20th century like tram/light rail technology did. Notable exceptions in the western world are Italy and Switzerland.

Country	Location	Started operation	No. of routes	Notes
Armenia	Yerevan	15 August 1949	5	
Austria	Linz	15 May 1944	4	
Austria	Salzburg	1 October 1940	12	
Argentina	Córdoba	7 May 1989	3	
Argentina	Rosario	24 May 1959	1	
Belarus	Babruysk	30 August 1978	4	
Belarus	Brest	18 April 1981	12	
Belarus	Gomel	20 May 1962	34	
Belarus	Grodno	5 November 1974	23	
Belarus	Minsk	19 September 1952	65	
Belarus	Mogilev	19 January 1970	10	
Belarus	Vitebsk	1 September 1978	17	
Bosnia and Herzegovina	Sarajevo	23 November 1984	5	
Brazil	São Paulo	22 April 1949	17	Two independent trolleybus systems, one owned by SPTrans (7 urban lines), the other by EMTU (10 BRT lines)
Bulgaria	Burgas	25 September 1989	1	
Bulgaria	Haskovo	1990	2	
Bulgaria	Pazardzhik	1 June 1993	6	
Bulgaria	Pleven	7 October 1985	17	
Bulgaria	Ruse	9 September 1988	9	
Bulgaria	Sliven	24 May 1986	2	
Bulgaria	Sofia	1 May 1948	10	
Bulgaria	Stara Zagora	November 1987	3	
Bulgaria	Varna	1 January 1986	3	
Bulgaria	Vratsa	1988	2	
Canada	Vancouver	16 August 1948	13	
Chile	Valparaíso	31 December 1952	2	
China	Baoding	29 December 2018	3	
China	Beijing	26 February 1957	28	Includes 3 BRT routes
China	Changzi	c. 1985	2	Commuter trolleybus line serving Wuyang Coal Mine
China	Dalian	1 October 1960	1	
China	Guangzhou	30 September 1960	7	
China	Hangzhou	26 April 1961	2	
China	Jinan	1 January 1977	18	
China	Qingdao	21 October 1960	3	
China	Shanghai	15 November 1914	7	Comprises 6 regular and 1 BRT routes
China	Taiyuan	1 May 1960	2	
China	Wuhan	20 September 1958	7	
China	Zhengzhou	1 January 2021	1	BRT
Czech Republic	Brno	30 July 1949	14	
Czech Republic	České Budějovice	2 May 1991	6	
Czech Republic	Chomutov–Jirkov	1 September 1995	6	
Czech Republic	Hradec Králové	2 May 1949	8	
Czech Republic	Jihlava	19 December 1948	8	
Czech Republic	Mariánské Lázně	27 April 1952	4	
Czech Republic	Opava	24 August 1952	4	
Czech Republic	Ostrava	9 May 1952	9	
Czech Republic	Pardubice	20 January 1952	12	
Czech Republic	Plzeň	9 April 1941	9	
Czech Republic	Prague	15 October 2017	5	
Czech Republic	Teplice	1 May 1952	10	
Czech Republic	Ústí nad Labem	1 July 1988	9	
Czech Republic	Zlín–Otrokovice	27 January 1944	13	
Ecuador	Quito	18 December 1995	4	BRT
Estonia	Tallinn	6 July 1965	5	
France	Limoges	14 July 1943	5	
France	Lyon	4 September 1935	9	
France	Nancy	27 September 1982	1	
France	Saint-Étienne	1 January 1942	2	
Georgia	Sukhumi	3 January 1968	3	
Germany	Eberswalde	3 November 1940	2	
Germany	Esslingen am Neckar	1 April 1944	3	
Germany	Solingen	19 June 1952	9	
Greece	Athens	27 December 1953	19	Piraeus system, which now operates as part of the Athens system, was opened in 1948 and connected to the Athens system in 1988.
Hungary	Budapest	21 December 1949	14	
Hungary	Debrecen	2 July 1985	5	
Hungary	Szeged	1 May 1979	6	
Italy	Ancona	15 March 1949	1	
Italy	Bologna	4 January 1991	6	
Italy	Cagliari	22 February 1952	4	
Italy	Chieti	1 August 1950	1	
Italy	Genoa	1 July 1997	1	
Italy	La Spezia	27 January 1951	3	
Italy	Lecce	12 January 2012	3	
Italy	Milan	28 October 1933	4	
Italy	Modena	21 January 1950	3	
Italy	Parma	25 October 1953	4	
Italy	Pescara	11 September 2025	1	
Italy	Naples	8 May 1940	4	
Italy	Rimini	1 January 1939	2	Includes the Metromare, a BRT line opened (for trolleybuses) in October 2021.
Italy	Rome	23 March 2005	3	
Kazakhstan	Almaty	20 April 1944	9	
Kyrgyzstan	Osh	1 November 1977	2	
Latvia	Riga	6 November 1947	21	
Lithuania	Kaunas	31 December 1965	17	
Lithuania	Vilnius	27 November 1956	16	
Mexico	Mexico City	9 March 1951	13	
Moldova	Bălți	12 June 1972	5	
Moldova	Chișinău	12 October 1949	24	
Moldova	Tighina	1996	8	System includes interurban line to Tiraspol
Moldova	Tiraspol	1 November 1967	7	System includes interurban line to Bender/Tighina
Netherlands	Arnhem	5 September 1949	14	
North Korea	Chongjin	20 October 1970	3	
North Korea	Hamhung	1973	2	
North Korea	Huichon	c. 2000	1	
North Korea	Kanggye	17 April 1992	1	
North Korea	Kimchaek	17 May 1985	1	
North Korea	Manpo	December 2019	1	
North Korea	Myongdang	c. 29 March 1995	1	
North Korea	Nampo	c. 1982	1	
North Korea	Pyongsong	c. 4 August 1983	2	
North Korea	Pyongyang	30 April 1962	9	
North Korea	Sariwon	19 June 1999	1	
North Korea	Sinhung		1	
North Korea	Sinuiju	c. 1977	1	
North Korea	Wonsan	8 September 1988	1	
Norway	Bergen	24 February 1950	1	
Poland	Gdynia	18 October 1943	18	Also extends to Sopot
Poland	Lublin	21 July 1953	13	
Poland	Tychy	1 October 1982	6	
Romania	Baia Mare	16 February 1996	2	
Romania	Brașov	1 May 1959	9	
Romania	Bucharest	10 November 1949	15	
Romania	Cluj-Napoca	7 November 1959	12	
Romania	Galați	23 August 1989	2	
Romania	Mediaș	22 December 1989	3	
Romania	Ploiești	1 September 1997	4	
Romania	Târgu Jiu	20 June 1995	2	System includes interurban line to Bârsești.
Romania	Timișoara	15 November 1942	8	System includes interurban lines to Dumbrăvița and Ghiroda
Romania	Vaslui	4 August 2023	1	
Russia	Bryansk	3 December 1960	11	
Russia	Vladimir	5 November 1952	9	'Officially' opened on 7 November 1952
Russia	Kovrov	6 March 1975	6	
Russia	Voronezh	6 November 1960	4	
Russia	Ivanovo	5 November 1962	11	
Russia	Kaluga	30 March 1956	14	
Russia	Kursk	21 August 1972	8	
Russia	Khimki	24 July 1997	3	2 routes run between Khimki and Moscow city
Russia	Podolsk	1 May 2001	5	
Russia	Vidnoye	9 September 2000	3	
Russia	Oryol	29 October 1968	4	
Russia	Ryazan	13 November 1949	15	
Russia	Smolensk	8 April 1991	4	
Russia	Tula	5 November 1962	7	
Russia	Rybinsk	14 December 1976	4	
Russia	Yaroslavl	7 November 1949	7	
Russia	Khabarovsk	17 January 1975	4	
Russia	Vladivostok	29 January 1965	4	
Russia	Vologda	22 August 1979	6	
Russia	Kaliningrad	5 November 1975	4	
Russia	Petrozavodsk	5 September 1961	8	
Russia	Murmansk	11 February 1962	5	World's northernmost trolleybus system.
Russia	Veliky Novgorod	3 December 1995	5	
Russia	Saint Petersburg	21 October 1936	44	
Russia	Barnaul	19 October 1973	5	
Russia	Rubtsovsk	28 December 1973	2	
Russia	Chita	30 December 1970	5	
Russia	Irkutsk	6 November 1970	5	
Russia	Bratsk	1 February 1975	5	
Russia	Kemerovo	25 September 1970	10	
Russia	Leninsk-Kuznetsky	11 January 1984	3	
Russia	Novokuznetsk	1 January 1978	4	
Russia	Krasnoyarsk	5 November 1959	8	
Russia	Novosibirsk	6 November 1957	14	
Russia	Omsk	5 November 1955	10	
Russia	Tomsk	7 November 1967	8	
Russia	Abakan	31 December 1980	12	
Russia	Maykop	29 November 1974	12	
Russia	Volgograd	31 December 1960	15	
Russia	Nalchik	22 November 1980	4	
Russia	Cherkessk	19 December 1988	9	
Russia	Armavir	16 June 1973	5	
Russia	Krasnodar	28 July 1950	17	
Russia	Novorossiysk	1 April 1969	14	
Russia	Stavropol	24 July 1964	9	
Russia	Rostov-on-Don	18 March 1936	8	
Russia	Volgodonsk	4 October 1977	6	
Russia	Yekaterinburg	17 October 1943	19	
Russia	Chelyabinsk	22 November 1942	22	
Russia	Miass	1 February 1975	5	
Russia	Sterlitamak	24 February 1961	23	
Russia	Ufa	27 January 1962	21	
Russia	Kirov	8 November 1943	8	
Russia	Yoshkar-Ola	1 February 1971	12	
Russia	Saransk	29 January 1966	17	
Russia	Dzerzhinsk	15 April 1976	5	
Russia	Nizhny Novgorod	27 June 1947	21	
Russia	Orenburg	1 May 1953	5	
Russia	Penza	4 November 1948	6	
Russia	Novokuybyshevsk	4 January 1986	16	
Russia	Samara	7 November 1942	16	
Russia	Tolyatti	21 January 1966	21	
Russia	Balakovo	18 November 1967	10	
Russia	Engels	29 April 1964	4	
Russia	Saratov	6 November 1952	11	
Russia	Almetyevsk	13 January 1976	4	
Russia	Kazan	27 November 1948	16	
Russia	Izhevsk	6 November 1968	11	
Russia	Ulyanovsk	31 December 1973	7	
Russia	Cheboksary	7 November 1964	19	
Russia	Novocheboksarsk	2 November 1979	4	
Saudi Arabia	Riyadh	23 April 2013	1	System is located on the campus of the King Saud bin Abdulaziz University for Health Sciences.
Serbia	Belgrade	22 June 1947	7	
Slovakia	Banská Bystrica	24 August 1989	8	
Slovakia	Bratislava	31 July 1941	15	
Slovakia	Prešov	13 May 1962	13	
Slovakia	Žilina	17 November 1994	8	
Spain	Castellón de la Plana	25 June 2008	1	
Sweden	Landskrona	27 September 2003	1	
Switzerland	Bern	29 October 1940	3	
Switzerland	Biel/Bienne	19 October 1940	2	
Switzerland	Fribourg	1 February 1949	1	
Switzerland	Geneva	11 September 1942	6	
Switzerland	La Chaux-de-Fonds	23 December 1949	1	
Switzerland	Lausanne	2 October 1932	10	
Switzerland	Lucerne	7 December 1941	6	
Switzerland	Montreux/Vevey	18 April 1957	1	
Switzerland	Neuchâtel	16 February 1940	3	
Switzerland	St. Gallen	18 July 1950	4	
Switzerland	Winterthur	28 December 1938	3	
Switzerland	Zürich	27 May 1939	7	
Tajikistan	Dushanbe	2 May 1955	8	
Turkey	Malatya	10 March 2015	1	
Turkey	Sanliurfa	28 April 2023	1	
Ukraine	Cherkasy	9 November 1965	23	
Ukraine	Chernihiv	4 November 1964	7	
Ukraine	Chernivtsi	1 February 1939	9	
Ukraine	Crimea	6 November 1959	21	
Ukraine	Kerch	18 September 2004	1	
Ukraine	Dnipro	7 November 1947	21	
Ukraine	Kryvyi Rih	21 December 1957	23	
Ukraine	Donetsk	3 January 1940	10	
Ukraine	Horlivka	6 November 1974	3	
Ukraine	Khartsyzk	4 February 1982	3	
Ukraine	Makiivka	13 November 1969	3	
Ukraine	Ivano-Frankivsk	31 December 1983	8	
Ukraine	Kharkiv	5 May 1939	24	
Ukraine	Kherson	16 June 1960	5	
Ukraine	Khmelnytskyi	25 December 1970	26	
Ukraine	Kropyvnytskyi	4 November 1967	7	
Ukraine	Kyiv	5 November 1935	45	
Ukraine	Bila Tserkva	23 June 1980	7	
Ukraine	Lviv	27 November 1952	10	
Ukraine	Mykolaiv	29 October 1967	8	
Ukraine	Odesa	5 November 1945	8	
Ukraine	Kremenchuk	6 November 1966	12	
Ukraine	Poltava	14 September 1962	9	
Ukraine	Rivne	27 December 1974	12	
Ukraine	Sevastopol	6 November 1950	16	
Ukraine	Sumy	25 August 1967	19	
Ukraine	Ternopil	24 December 1975	8	
Ukraine	Vinnytsia	20 February 1964	22	
Ukraine	Lutsk	8 April 1972	12	
Ukraine	Zaporizhzhia	22 December 1949	6	
Ukraine	Zhytomyr	1 May 1962	11	
United States	Dayton	23 April 1933	5	
United States	San Francisco	6 October 1935	15	
United States	Seattle	28 April 1940	15	
United States	Philadelphia	14 October 1923	3	
Uzbekistan	Urgench	20 October 1997	1	

== See also ==
- Trolleybus
- List of trolleybus systems
- Trolleybus usage by country
