= Trolleybuses in Poland =

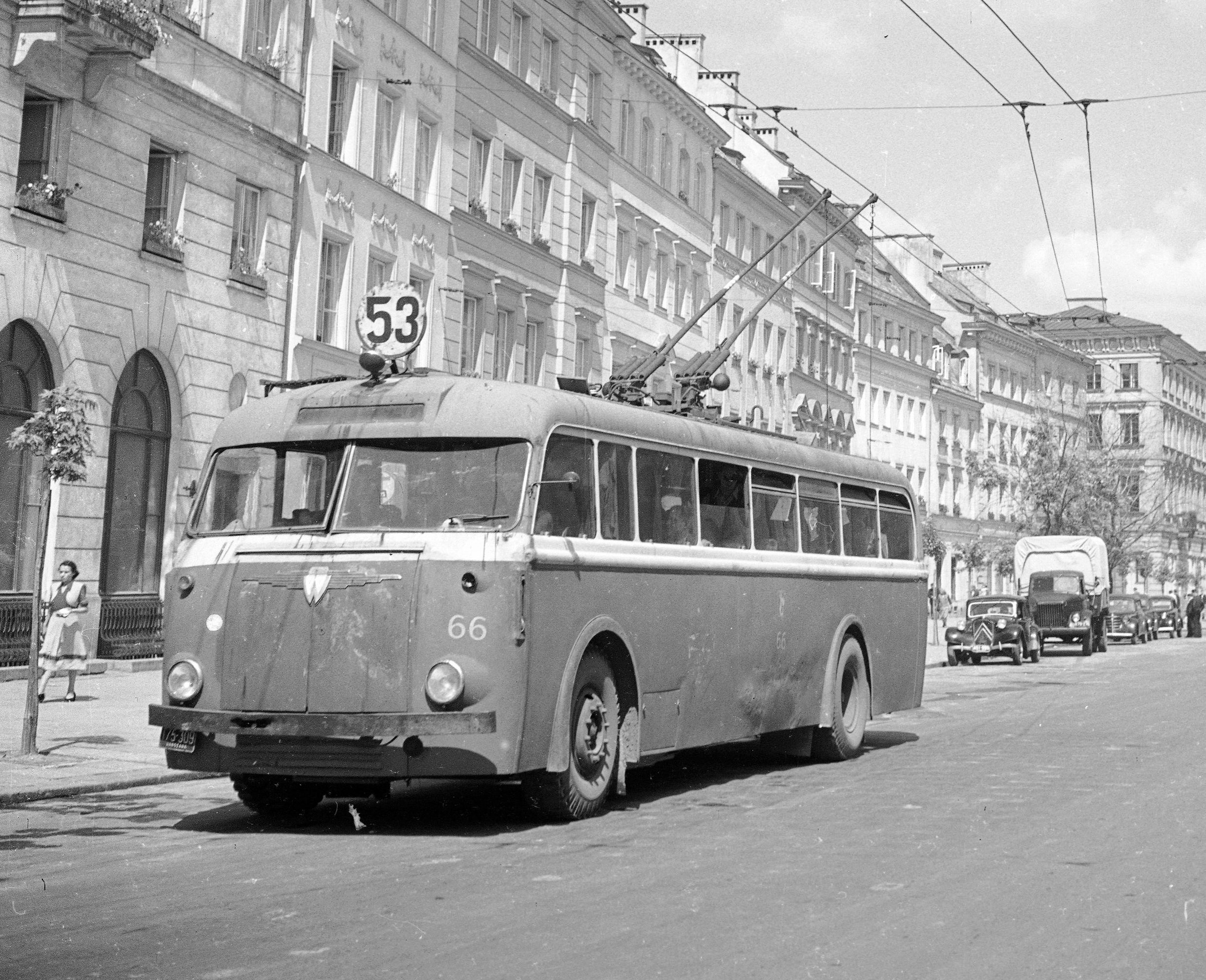
LOWA W602a trolleybus in Warsaw, mid-1950s

The first trolleybus network in Poland opened in Poznań in 1930. There were 7 municipal systems operational after World War Two, partially inherited after the Germans; the trolleybus transportation reached its climax in the early 1960s, with some 130 vehicles in Warsaw alone. Most systems were closed in the 1970s. Currently there are 3 networks in service, in Gdynia, Lublin, and Tychy. The total number of vehicles operational is about 260.

== History ==
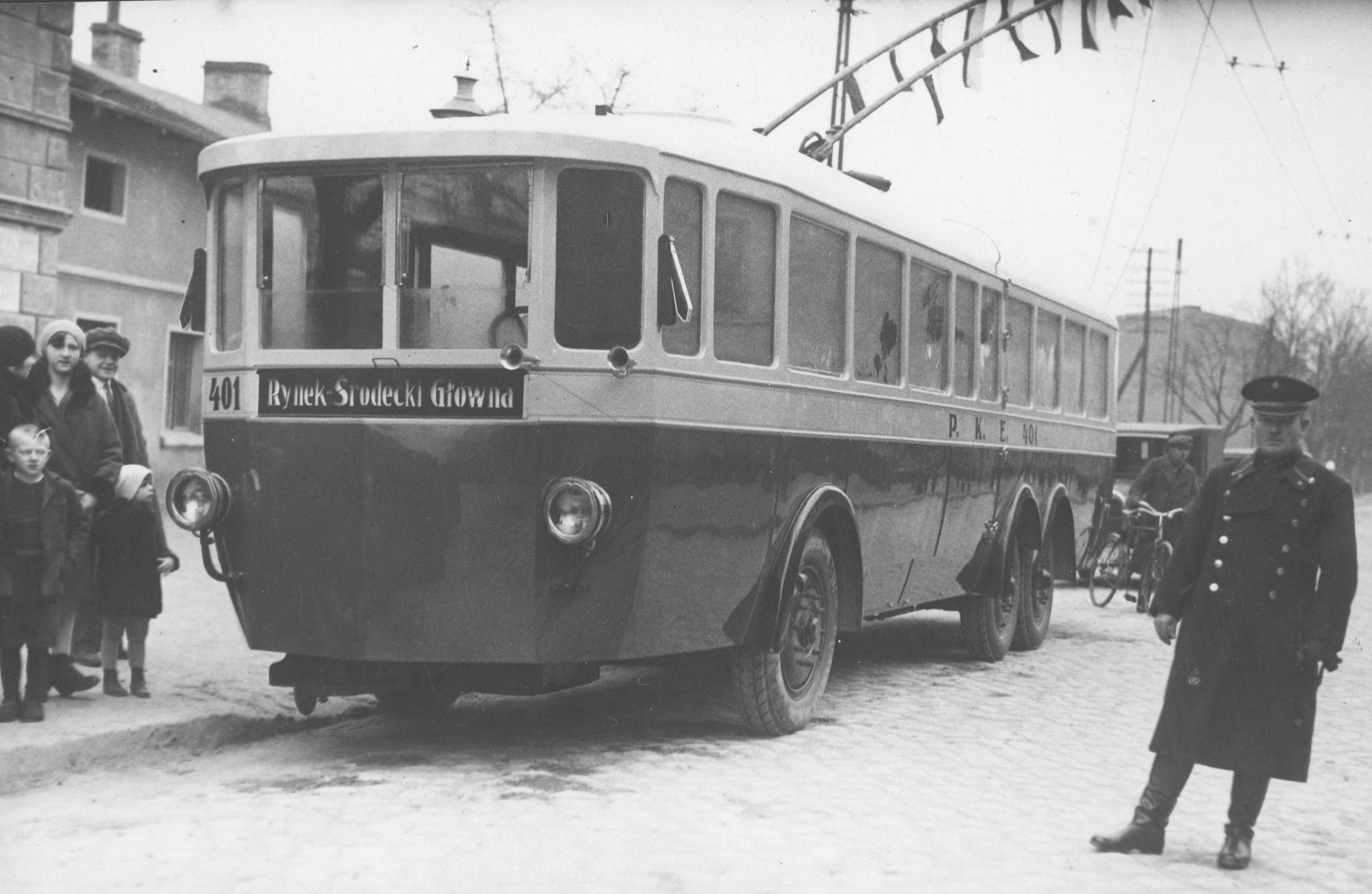
Opening of trolleybus system in Poznań, 1930

The first trolleybus line in Poland was opened in Poznań in 1930, though in what is now Poland the first line briefly operated in Breslau (now Wrocław) in 1912-1913. During World War Two new systems, mostly reduced to single lines, were opened in Allenstein (now Olsztyn), Gotenhafen (before and now Gdynia), Landsberg (now Gorzów Wielkopolski), Liegnitz (now Legnica), and Waldenburg (now Wałbrzych), with other openings planned. The network in Gorzów was discontinued, but the other ones kept operating also after 1945.

In the early post-war period there were 7 municipal trolleybus systems operational: except the ones opened earlier, new networks were launched in Warsaw (1946) and Lublin (1953). Though the Legnica network was closed in 1956, the trolleybus transportation enjoyed its heyday in the early 1960s, when the total number of vehicles exceeded 300: some 130 trolleybuses served in Warsaw, 40-60 in Gdynia, Lublin and Wałbrzych each, and around 20 in Olsztyn and Poznań each.

In the late 1960s the trolleybus transportation in Poland went into decline. The networks started to shrink; the Poznań one was closed in 1970 (after 40 years of service), the Olsztyn one in 1971 (after 32 years), the Wałbrzych one in 1973 (after 29 years) and the Warsaw one in 1973 (after 27 years). Existing systems in Gdynia and Lublin were being reduced, kept deteriorating and local municipal authorities considered scrapping them altogether.

In the 1980s trolleybus networks were opened or re-opened in Dębica, Tychy, Słupsk, and Warszawa. Most of them proved ephemeral and reduced to few lines except Tychy, where the system survived and, following the period of stagnation, started to grow. The trolleybus transportation turned the corner in the 1990s: new lines were being opened and fleets were getting renewed. Today all 3 existing networks are deemed indispensable components of municipal public transport systems. However, except Olsztyn no other city considered launch of a new trolleybus network.

== Currently operational systems ==
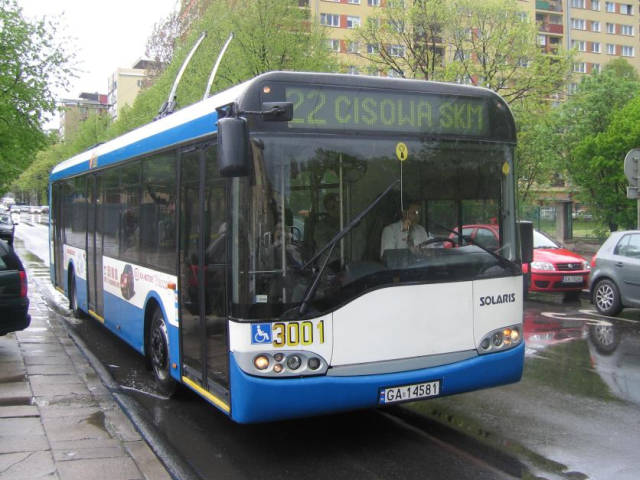
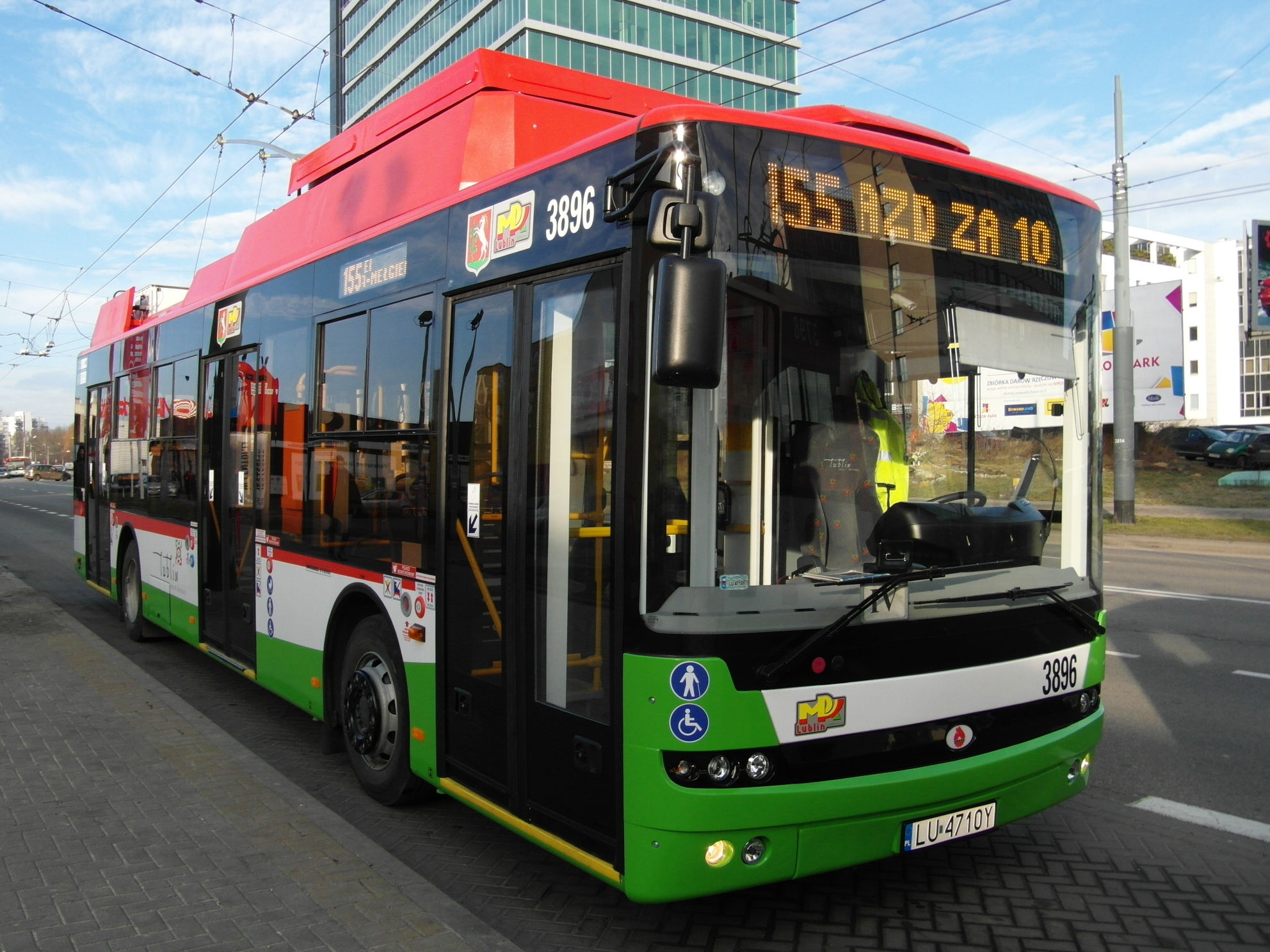

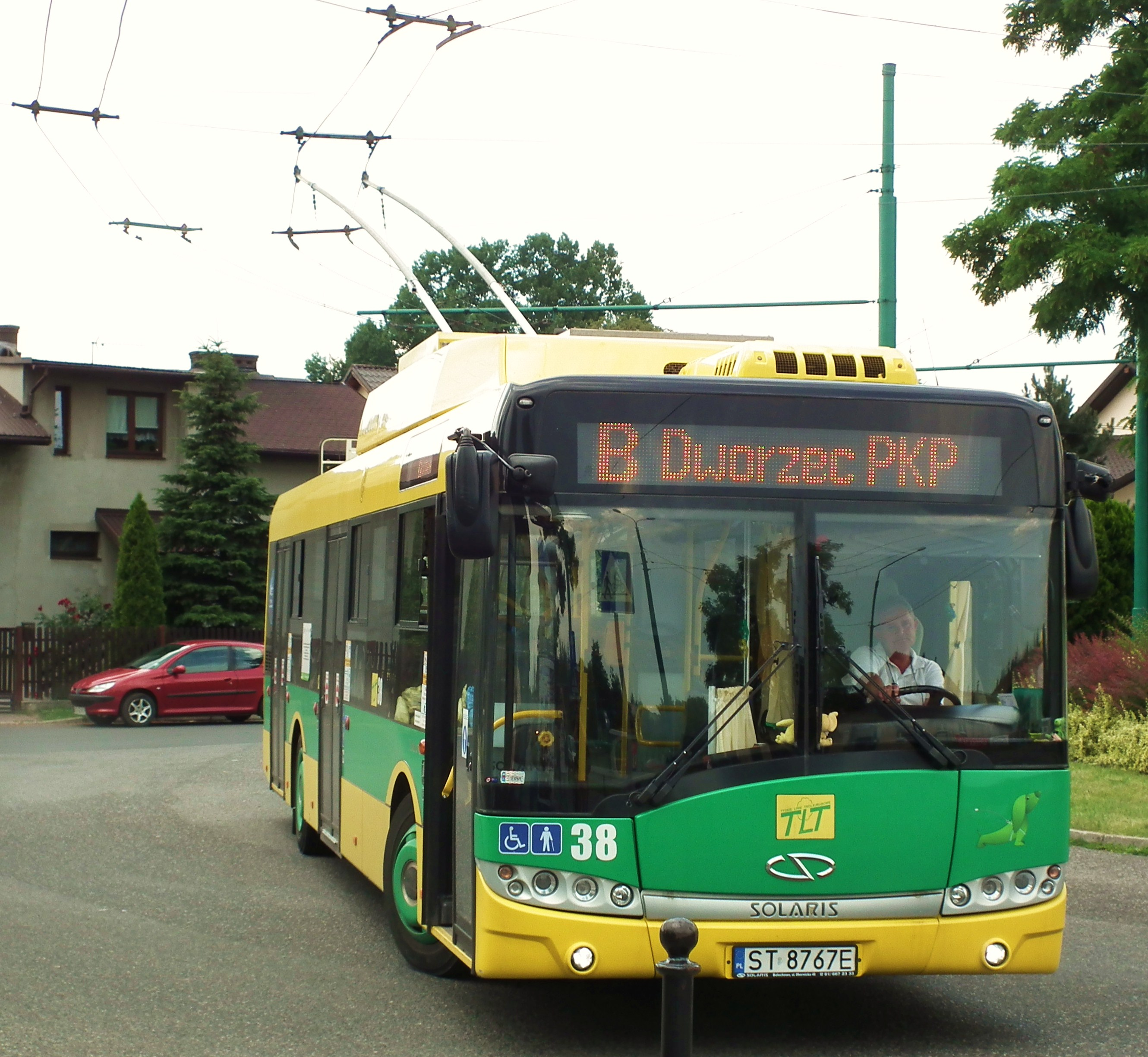
Trolleybuses in Gdynia (top), Lublin (middle), and Tychy (bottom)

As of 2020 there were 3 trolleybus networks operational in Poland: in Gdynia (with 3 lines reaching to Sopot), Lublin, and Tychy. Trolleybuses in these cities supplement other types of public transport, such as buses and trains.

| category | measure | Gdynia | Lublin | Tychy |
|---|---|---|---|---|
| date established | year | 1943 | 1953 | 1982 |
| operator | name | PKT Gdynia | MPK Lublin | TLT Tychy |
| operator focus | type | trolleybus-only | municipal transport | trolleybus-only |
| ownership | type | municipal | municipal | municipal |
| total supply | vehicle-km | 5.383.116 | 5.028.500 | 1.292.000 |
| catenary | km | 87 | 146 | 44 |
| fleet | # of vehicles | 103 | 139 | 21 |
| regular lines | # of routes | 12 | 13 | 7 |
| average vehicle annual mileage | km | 56.074 | 41.558 | 56.174 |
| density of supply | vehicle-km/inhabitants | 19,1 | 14,8 | 10,1 |
| average energy consumption | kWh/km | 1,98 | 2,24 | 1,87 |
| catenary independence | % | 8,71 | 2,25 | 2,57 |
| cost | PLN/vehicle-km | 10,58 | 10,20 | 10,45 |

== See also ==
- Trolleybuses in Gdynia
- Trolleybuses in Lublin
- Trolleybuses in Tychy
