= Burgasbus =

Public transit service in Burgas, Bulgaria

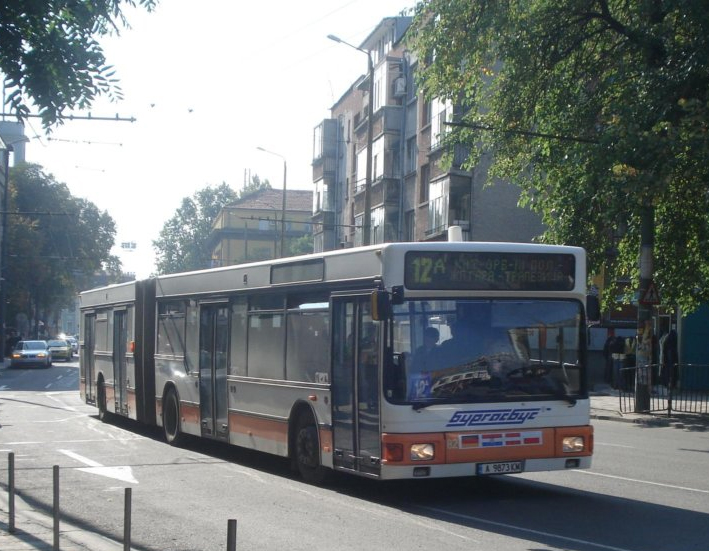
- A MAN NG 272, serving for Burgasbus

Overview
- Native name: Бургасбус
- Owner: Burgas Municipality
- Area served: Burgas Municipality
- Locale: Burgas, Bulgaria
- Transit type: Bus Trolleybus
- Number of lines: 39
- Annual ridership: 23 835 (2023)
- Website: https://burgasbus.info

Operation
- Number of vehicles: 217

Technical
- System length: 913.05 km (567.3 mi)

Burgasbus (Bulgarian: Бургасбус), sometimes stylized as BurgasBus, is the public transit service of the city of Burgas, Bulgaria. It serves the majority of the bus and all of the trolleybus routes within the Municipality of Burgas.

Burgasbus operates both diesel and electric buses, as well as the Burgas trolleybus system. As of the end of 2023, the company had 718 employees.

== History ==
The Company was founded on November 18, 1991. Initially the company was owned by the state, but in 1997 the company came under the control of the Burgas municipality.

In 2007, soon after its coming into power, the new management of Municipality of Burgas started subsidizing Burgasbus, so that the company could afford to buy new buses and trolleybuses. By now the firm possesses around 200 buses and 20 trolley buses, but still the majority of them are amortized.

An important contribution to renewing the rolling stock has the former mayor of Burgas Mr. Ioan Kostadinov. In 1996 a great purchase was made with 30 brand-new Chavdar buses, made in Bulgaria. In 2005 12 recycled buses were bought. In 2008 another substantial renewing of the rolling stock took place when over 20 recycled buses, 10 recycled trolley buses and 10 brand-new Tedom buses were bought.

== Bus stations ==
The two bus stations in the town are a property of Burgasbus as well. South bus station is situated on the Bulair Blvd. near the railway station and West bus station is situated in the north industrial district next to Billa hypermarket.

== Ticketing ==
In the vehicles of the firm, passengers are charged immediately after their boarding by a conductor. Due to the town council of Burgas, Burgasbus offers low-cost season tickets for pupils and students, currently studying, and pensioners (above 65 or 70 years old).

== Urban bus fleet ==
MAN SG, MAN NG, MAN NL, Mercedes-Benz O405G, Mercedes-Benz O345 Conecto, Mercedes-Benz O405N, NEOPLAN N4015, Setra SG219, TEDOM C 12G, Solaris Urbino 12, Solaris Urbino 18, Irizar ie bus 12, 18. Chavdar 120 buses have become the badge of Burgas transport. The only ones 20 manufactured pieces are owned by Burgasbus.

== Decommissioned ==
Chavdar 141, Chavdar 120, Chavdar 11Г5, Chavdar 11М4, Chavdar В13-20, Chavdar B14-20, Ikarus 280.03, Ikarus 280.02, Ikarus 260, Ikarus 280.04, DAF SB201 / Hainje, NEOPLAN N4021NF, Neoplan N116 Cityliner, MAN SG262, NEOPLAN N4016, Setra SG221ÜL.

== See also ==
- Burgas Central railway station
- Trolleybuses in Burgas
