= Burgas Central railway station =

Railway station in Burgas, Bulgaria

Burgas Central Централна гара Бургас
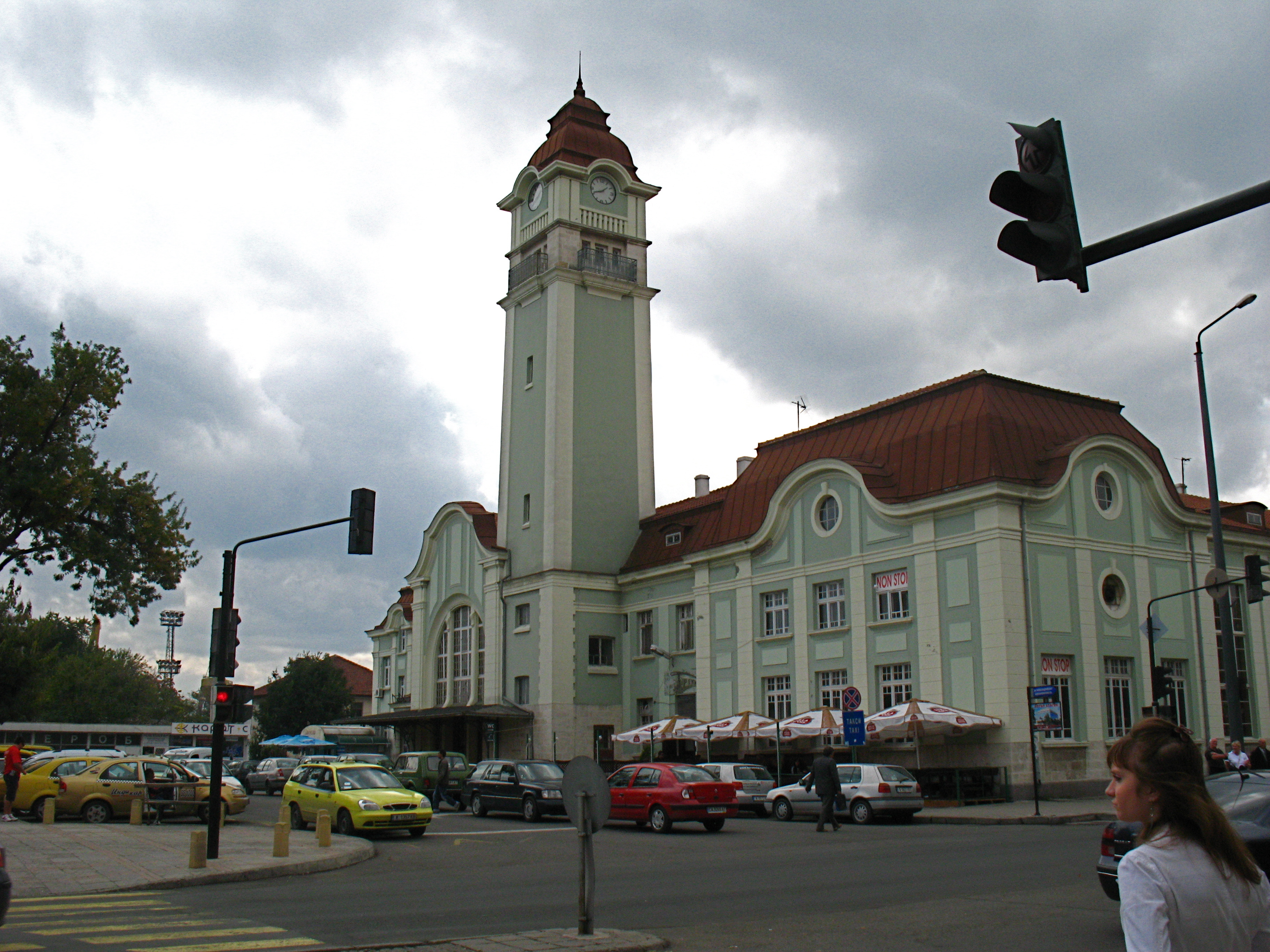
- The station building in 2008.

General information
- Location: Bulgaria
- Coordinates: 42°29′27″N 27°28′21″E
- Line(s): Railway line 8

History
- Opened: 1903
Location

Burgas Central railway station (Bulgarian: Централна железопътна гара Бургас, romanized: Tsentralna zhelezopatna gara Burgas) is the main station serving the Black Sea city and municipality of Burgas, the fourth most populous city, and the largest and most important port, in Bulgaria.

Opened in 1903, the station is the terminus of the line from Karnobat, which links Burgas with the rest of Bulgaria's rail network.

== See also ==
- Burgasbus
- Trolleybuses in Burgas
