= Trolleybuses in Burgas =

Bulgarian public transit system

Burgas trolleybus system
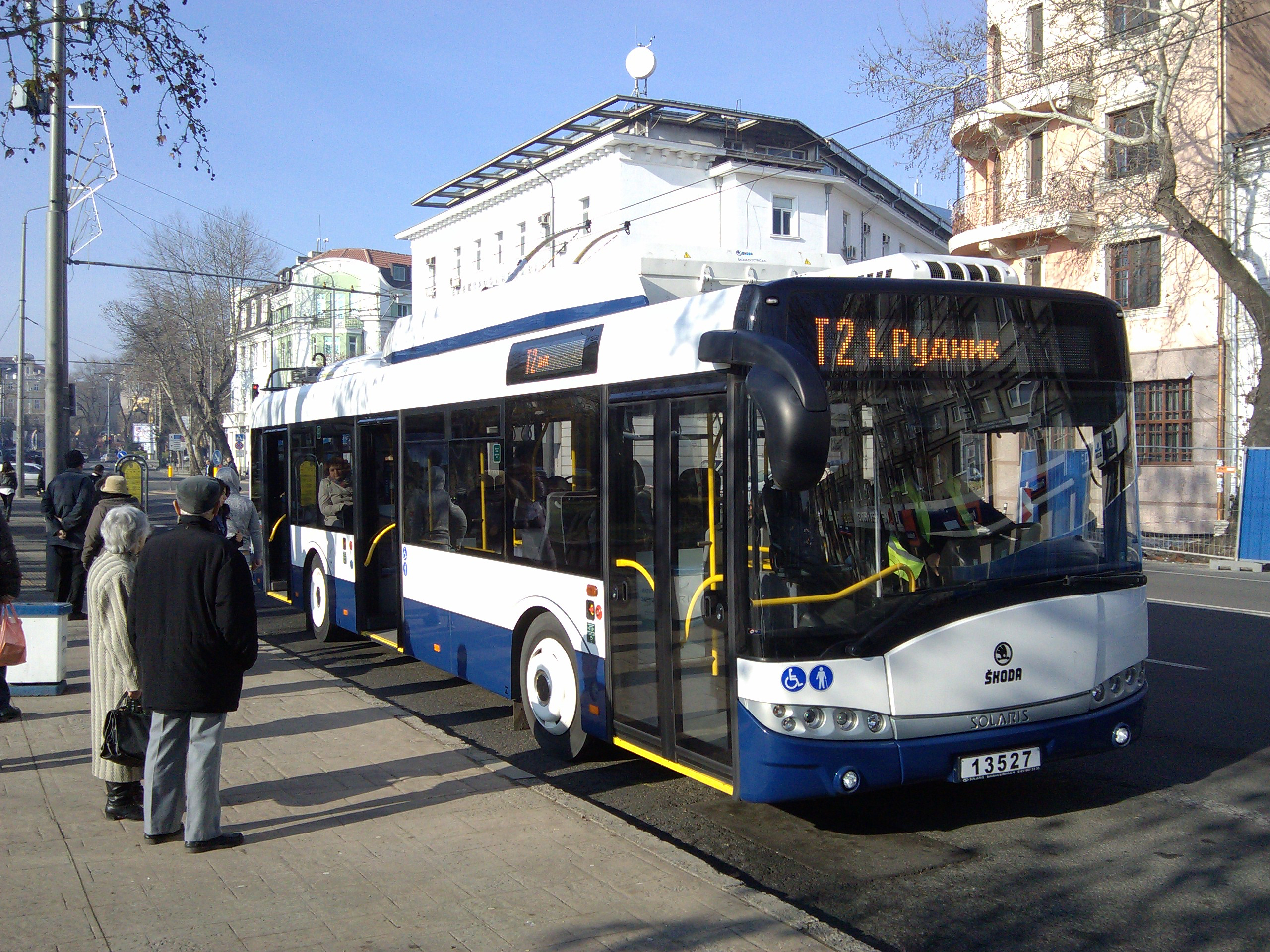
- A Škoda 26Tr Solaris on Line T2 in Burgas.

Operation
- Locale: Burgas, Bulgaria
- Open: 1989
- Status: Open
- Routes: 2
- Operator: Burgasbus

Infrastructure
- Depot: 1
- Stock: 22 trolleybuses

Statistics
- Website: http://burgasbus.info/ Burgasbus (in Bulgarian)

The Burgas trolleybus system (Bulgarian: Бургаски тролейбусен транспорт) forms part of the public transport network of the Black Sea city and municipality of Burgas, the fourth most populous city, and the largest and most important port, in Bulgaria.

The system presently comprises two routes, one of which is temporarily suspended.

== History ==
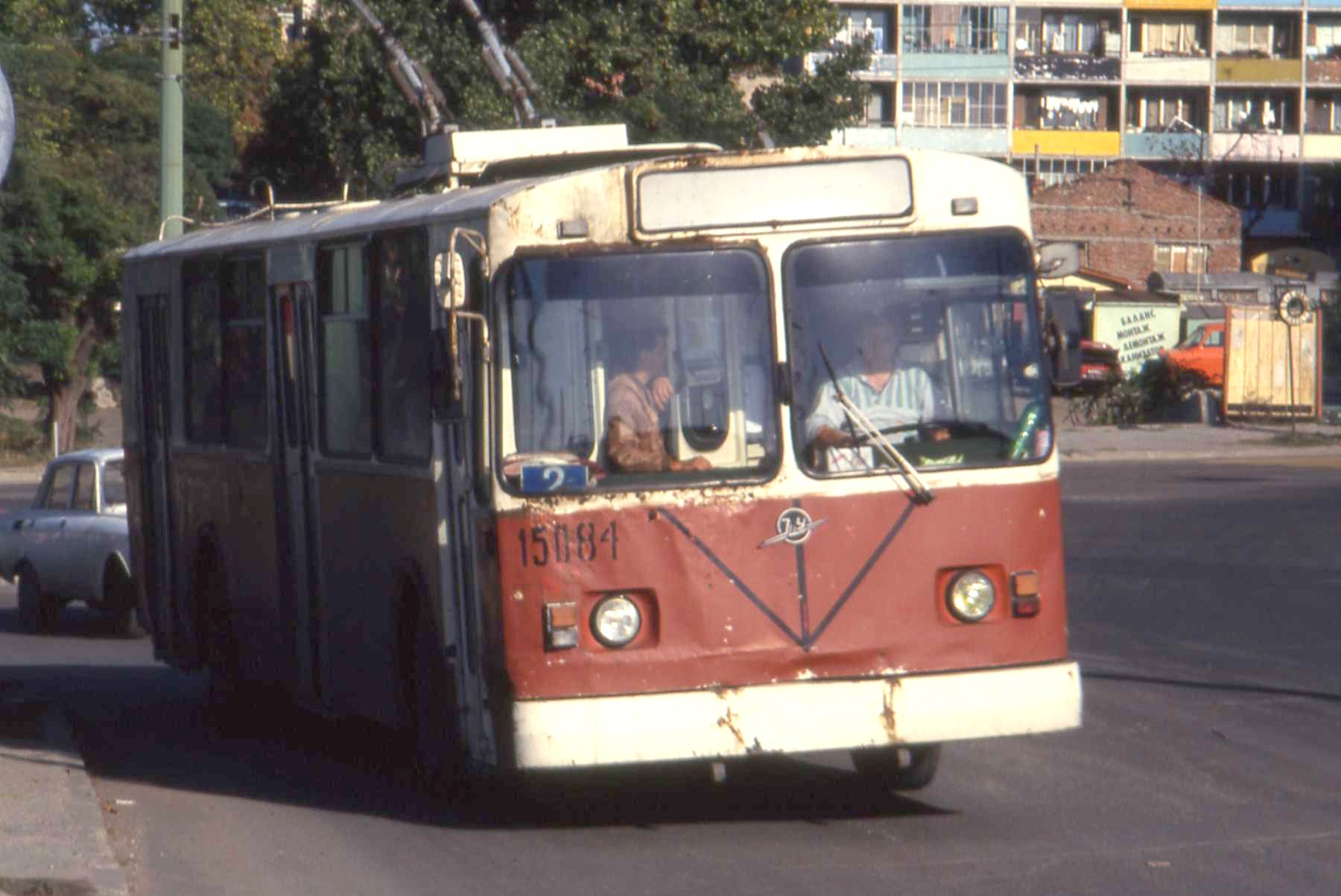
ZiU-9 trolleybus

Opened on 25 September 1989, the Burgas trolleybus system was originally operated by ZiU-9 trolleybuses. Those vehicles have since been replaced by Berna and Volvo trolleybuses acquired second hand from other systems, which in turn were replaced by brand new Škoda 26Tr Solaris trolleybuses in 2014.

Some parts of the original system have been closed down and the overhead wires removed. In the late 2000s only one line was still operating.

However, in 2010 the operator of the system Burgasbus commissioned a second line, T2, which opened in mid-2011. The T2 line created a better connection between the western suburb of Meden Rudnik (Bulgarian: Меден Рудник) and the city centre.

In 2013 Burgas along with Pleven, Stara Zagora and Varna placed a joint order for 100 brand new Škoda 26Tr Solaris trolleybuses financed by a European Union program. Burgas received 22 of them in 2014 and completely replaced the outdated fleet, while keeping 2 of the old fleet - 1 Berna and 1 Volvo - as future museum vehicles.

On 26 January 2022, Line T2 was temporarily suspended.

On 29 August 2022, Line T1 and the trolleybuses as a whole were suspended, due to the repairing of "Industrialna" street. However, on 3 January 2023, Line T1 was reestablished, but would temporarily be operated by diesel buses, during the weekdays.

In December 2024, the emergency truck of Burgasbus was spotted repairing the trolleybus network in Meden Rudnik. There, an employee of the company confirmed that trolleybuses would be back in service in the beginning of 2025.

During December 2024 and January 2025, multiple trolleybus units were put on test drive around the trolleybus networks.

On January 30, 2025, Burgasbus announced on their website, that after more than 2 years, trolleybuses will come back to service on Line T1 On 3 February 2025, with a new timetable.

In mid-February 2025, the emergency truck was spotted repairing the network in bul. Stefan Stambolov, where Line T2 passes. The workers in the truck stated that Line T2 would be brought back in the summer of 2025, however this did not happen.

In October 2026, the 2 museum vehicles - the Berna and Volvo trolleybuses, 12 years after their preservation, were withdrawn and scrapped in Yambol.

== Services ==
As of December 2024, the Burgas trolleybus lines are:

- T1 Meden Rudnik (through Vastanicheska strt.) - Burgas Central railway station - Hristo Botev blvd. – Maria Luiza blvd. - Meden Rudnik;
- T2 Meden Rudnik (through Apostol Voivoda strt.) – Burgas Central railway station – Demokratsia blvd. - Hristo Botev blvd. - Meden Rudnik. (temporarily suspended as of 2022)

== Trolleybus fleet ==
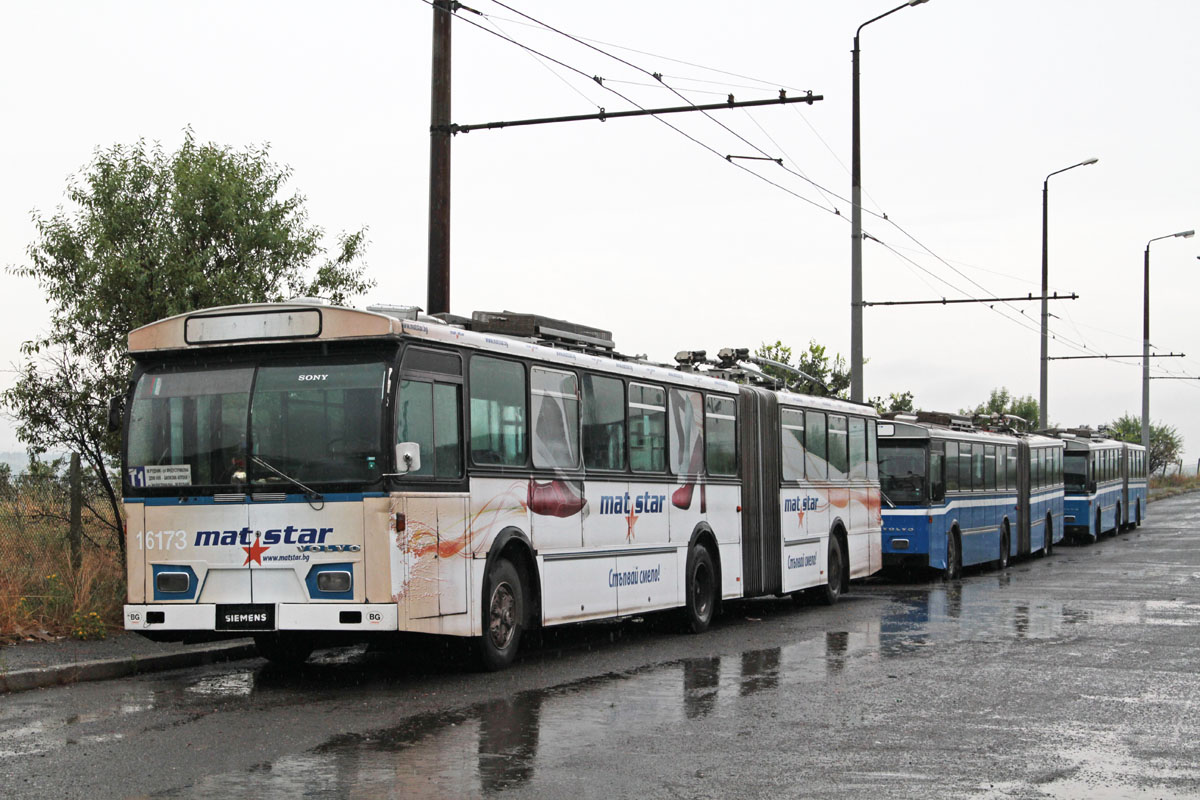
Former Volvo B58/Hess trolleybuses

=== Current fleet ===
As of 2014, the Burgas trolleybus fleet consisted of 22 trolleybuses.

- Škoda 26Tr Solaris - 22 units - Currently only 6 are in operation, with 7 being used for parts and the rest out of service.

=== Past fleet ===
- ZiU-9 - 20 units (1989-2010);
- Berna 4GTP - 5 units acquired from Winterthur (1999-2014 (1 unit kept as a museum exhibitor until 2026);
- Volvo B58/Hess - 11 units acquired from Lucerne (2008-2014) (1 unit kept as a museum exhibitor until 2026);

== See also ==
- Burgas Central railway station
- List of trolleybus systems
