= Trolleybuses in Minsk =

Transit system in Minsk, Belarus

Minsk trolleybus system
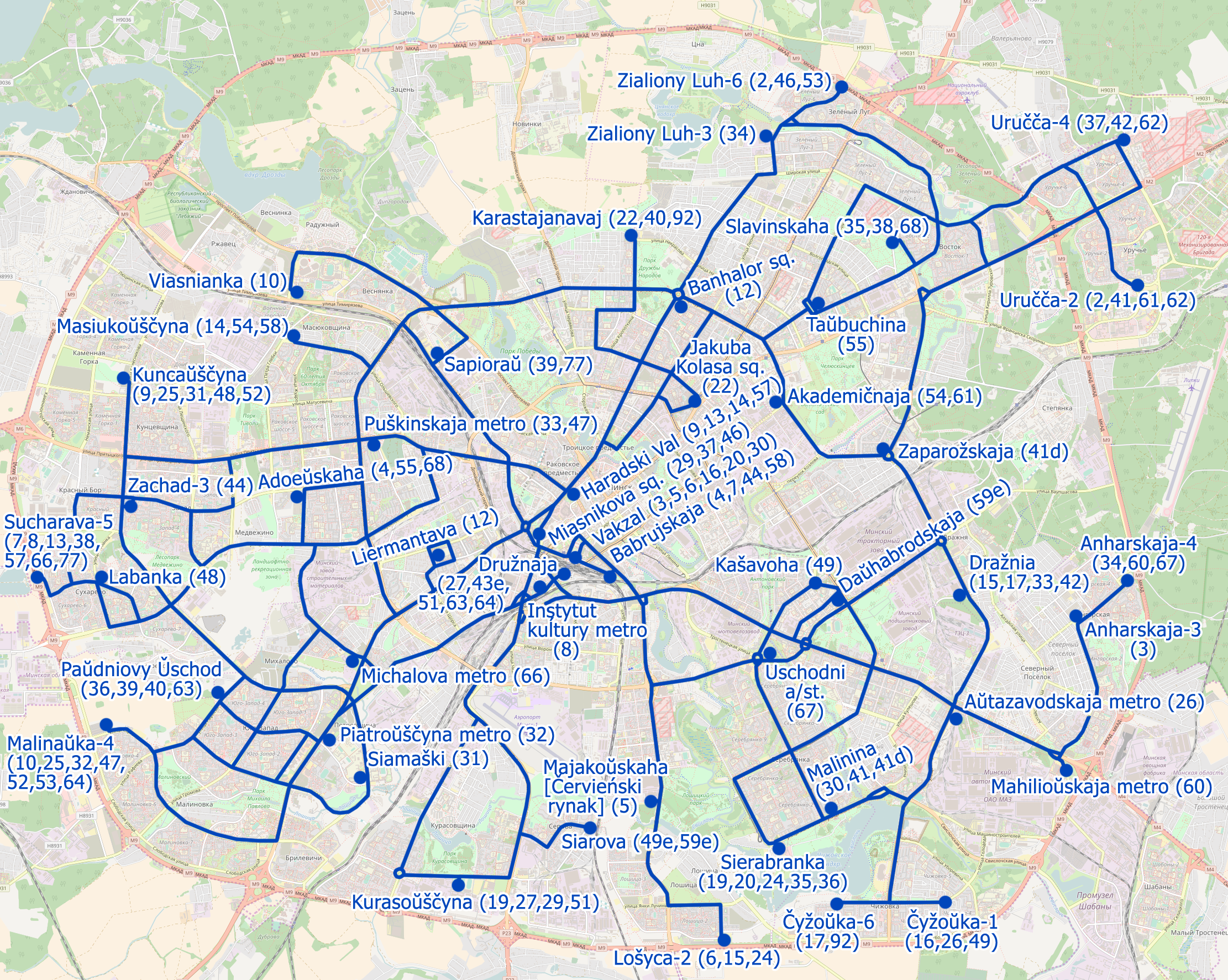
- Map of the system, December 2018

Operation
- Locale: Minsk, Belarus
- Open: 1952
- Status: Open
- Routes: 61
- Operator: Minsktrans

Infrastructure
- Depot: 4
- Stock: 720 (2025)

Statistics
- Track length (total): 312 km
- 173.1 million (2015)
- Website: www.minsktrans.by

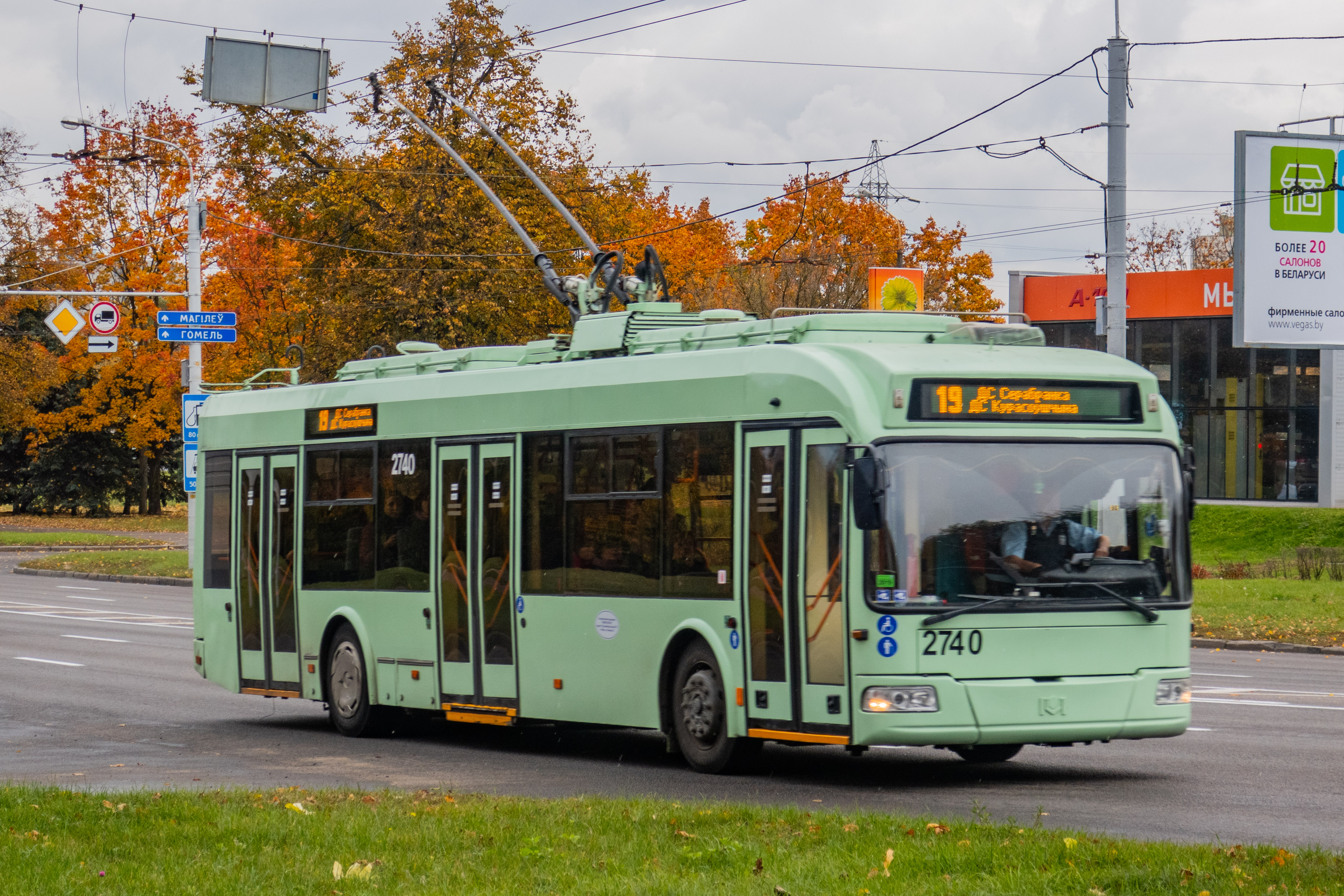
Belkommunmash BKM-321

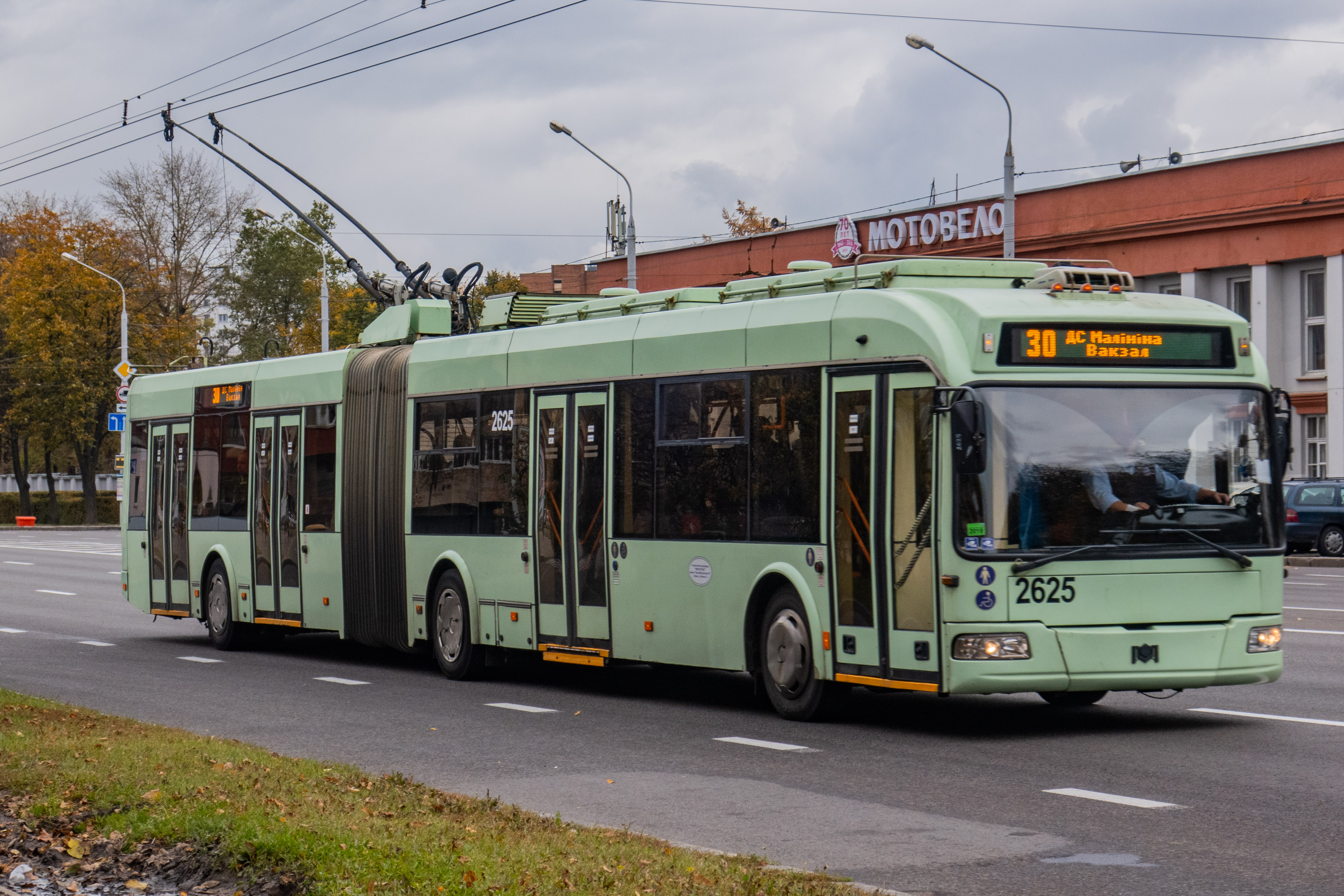
Belkommunmash BKM-333

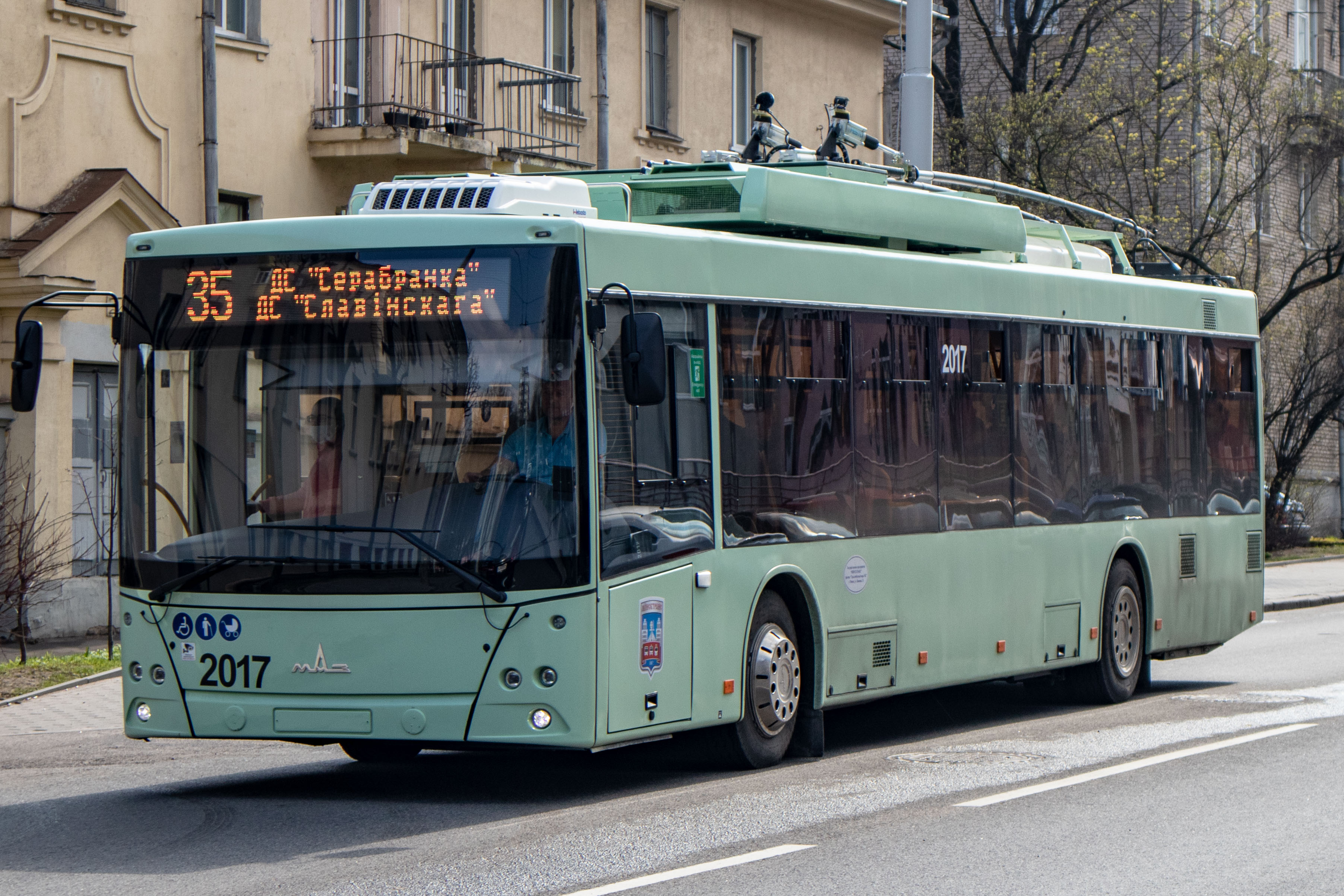
MAZ-203T70

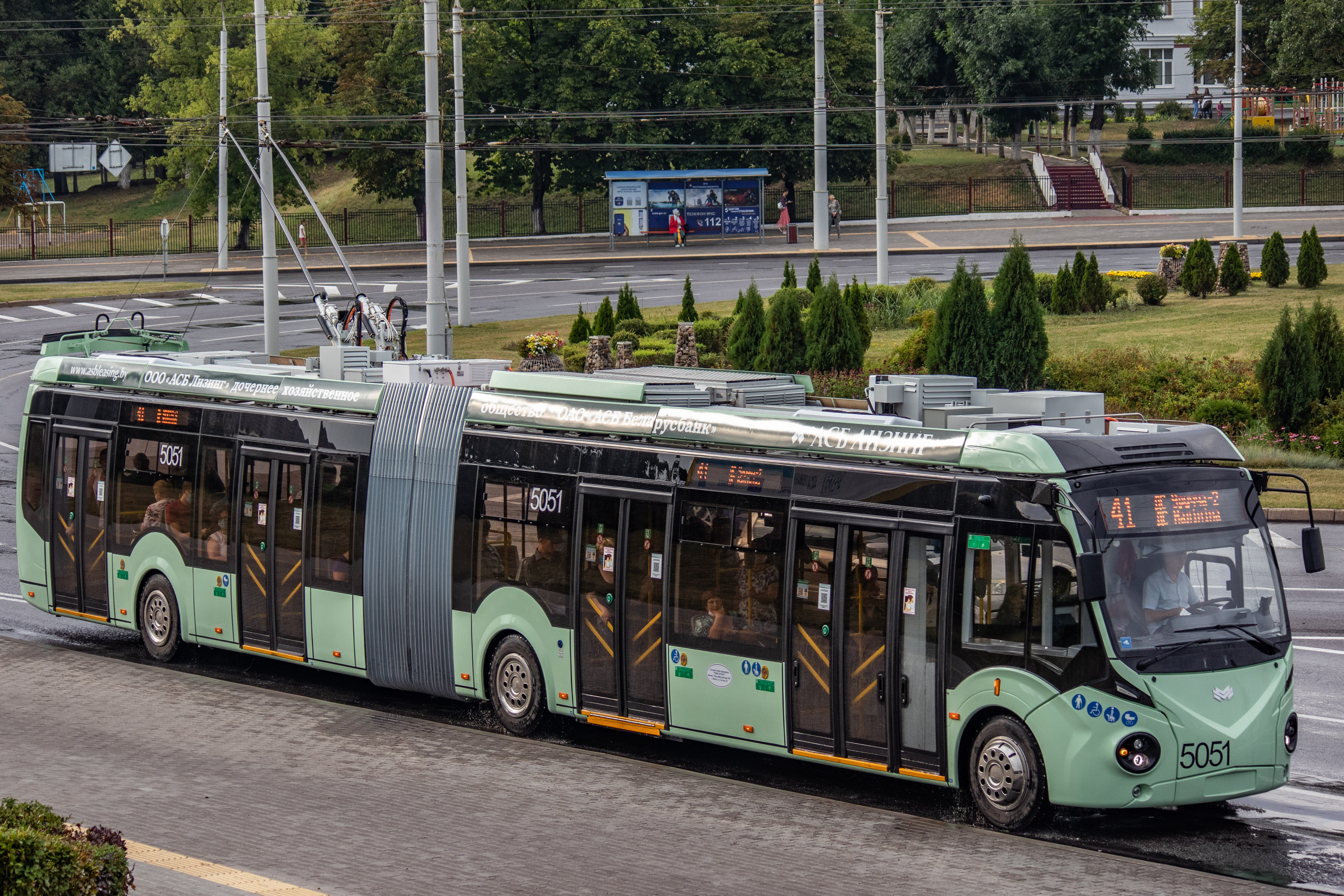
Belkommunmash BKM-43300D

The Minsk trolleybus system (Belarusian: Мінскі тралейбус; Russian: Минский троллейбус) serves the city of Minsk, the capital of Belarus. The system was opened on September 19, 1952. Nowadays it has more than 60 lines. The system is operated by the "Minsktrans" state enterprise. According to the Transportation Research Board, currently trolleybus system of Minsk is the largest in the world (277 km of overhead contact net and 35 km of wireless ways).

== History ==
Construction of the Minsk trolleybus system started after a decree of the Council of Ministers of the BSSR (November 1949). The first line, opened on 19 September 1952, connected Train Passenger Station and the Round Square (now — Victory Square, total 6 km). 5 trolleybuses served the system on the opening day. The system was developing fast — in 1956, 39 trolleybuses were serving 16 km of lines.

In 1971 was open new Trolleybus depot # 2 at Vaneeva street. Since 2022 this depot has become common for buses and trolleybuses. Minsk developed very much. New trolleybus depot # 3 was built in 1979 for serving new South-Western districts of Minsk. In 1985 was open depot # 4. The greatest depot # 5 was open in 1988. But in 2006 the oldest depot # 1 was closed because of decision to build new residential quarter at Masherova avenue.

Number of passengers per year, millions

== Fare payment ==
During Soviet times, a trolleybus ticket price was 4 kopecks. Currently, the ticket costs 95 copecks ($0.32) in ticket office and 1 rubel copecks ($0.33) if you buy from driver. It is possible to pay also via SMS.

== Routes ==
As of October 2025 the system operates 61 trolleybus routes. 12 of them use only wireless trolleybuses (IMC electric buses). About 30% of trolleybus routes are served by articulated vehicles.
Wireless routes
There 12 routes permanently served by wireless trolleybuses (IMC):
- Nr. 1 "Zelyonyi Lug-7 - Moscovskaya metro station;
- Nr. 18 "Sukharevo-5 - Lutsinskaya";
- Nr. 21 "Sukharevo-5 - Lutsinskaya";
- Nr. 22 "Carastojanovoy - Loshitsa-2";
- Nr. 23 "Chervenskyi rynok - Lermontova";
- Nr. 26 "Chizhovka-1 - Angarskaya-4";
- Nr. 45 "Sukharevo-5 - Petrovshchina metro station";
- Nr. 50 "Loshitsa-2 - Autozavodskaya metro station";
- Nr. 52 "Malinovka-4 - Lutsinskaya";
- Nr. 56 "Serebryanka - Drazhnya";
- Nr. 82 "Serebryanka - Korzhnevkogo";
- Nr. 90 "Bus terminal Yugo-Zapadnaya - ulitsa Semenyako".
Routes 22, 52, 82 and 90 partially are served by articulated IMC trolleybuses.

== Fleet ==
As of October 2025, current rolling stock of Minsktrans consists of 720 trolleybuses. 129 of them are articulated. About 40% (315 vehicles) are wireless (IMC electric buses such like BKM-32100D, MAZ-203T70, MAZ-303T20, articulated BKM-43300D).
In 2025 Minsktrans should receive 84 new IMC buses MAZ-303T20 and 6 IMC buses of previous generation MAZ-203T70 equipped with dual set of vehicle control for training and practice of new drivers. Some of these trolleybuses are already delivered to depots and successfully operates at city trolley routes.

Number of trolleybuses in Minsk

Currently all trolleybuses are Belarusian-produced (by Belkommunmash and MAZ). BKM-321 and MAZ-203T70 are the most common models.

== Depots ==
There are 4 trolleybus depots are currently in operation:

Transport depot No.2 (Vaneeva 31)
Common depot for diesel buses, traditional trolleybuses and IMC trolleybuses. Electric rolling stock - 126 vehicles.

Trolleybus depot No.3 (Gurskogo, 17)
Capacity - 220 trolleybuses (including articulated).

Transport depot No.4 (Kharkovskya, 16)
Transport depot Nr. 4 is the only one not operating articulated vehicles. It operates traditional trolleybuses, IMC electric buses and OC electric buses.

Depot No.5 (Soltysa, 26)
It is the largest depot in Minsk. The capacity of this depot is about 250 single and articulated vehicles. About a half of them are IMC electric buses (single BKM-32100D, MAZ-203T70, MAZ-303T20 and articulated BKM-43300D). The new depot should be built in Uručča district (northeastern part of Minsk) as trolleybus depot. It was open in 2021. But it still serves only diesel buses and electric buses OC type.
