= Trolleybuses in Mariánské Lázně =

Transit system in the Czech Republic

Mariánské Lázně trolleybus system
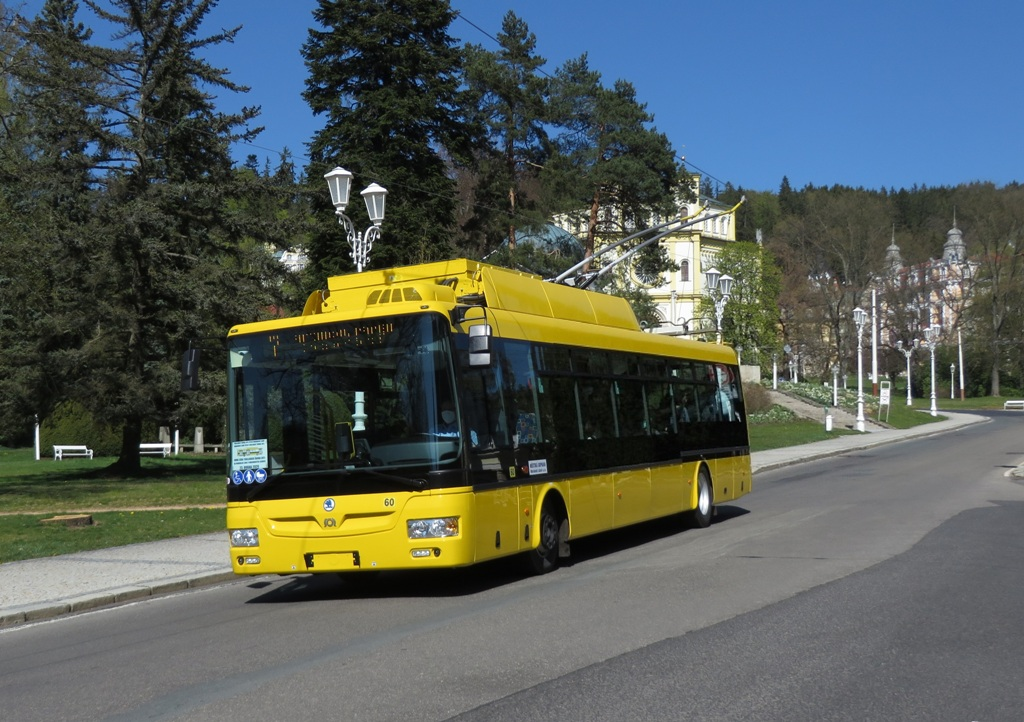

Overview
- Owner: 60% town, 40% private company BENT HOLDING, a.s.
- Locale: Mariánské Lázně, Czech Republic
- Transit type: Trolleybus system
- Number of lines: 4
- Number of stations: 27
- Website: http://www.mdml.cz/

Operation
- Began operation: 27 April 1952
- Operator: Městská Doprava Mariánské Lázně s. r. o.
- Number of vehicles: 8

Technical
- System length: 12 km

The Mariánské Lázně trolleybus system forms part of the public transport network in Mariánské Lázně, in the Czech Republic. The spa town located in the western part of the Czech Republic is one of the smallest towns in the world that still has an operating trolleybus system. It was established as a replacement for older no longer adequate tram system and went into operation on 27 April 1952, when Mariánské Lázně was in Czechoslovakia. The very first vehicles to operate the newly established network were Škoda 7Tr. Since 2006 the public transport in Mariánské Lázně is operated by Městská Doprava Mariánské Lázně s. r. o. company.

The new trolleybus system not only connected railway station with the city centre, which a tram line trolleybuses replaced did as well, but also extended the operation to other town areas. Over the years the reach of the network extended practically to all directions connecting all major parts of the town. At its peak size, the system served the following terminus stations: "Antoníčkův pramen", "Panská pole", "Goethovo náměstí", "City Service", "Velká Hleďsebe" and "Lesní pramen". However, the service to Lesní pramen was suspended from 1979 to 1986 and then finally ended in 1996. The remaining trolleybus wires in this section were removed in 2012.

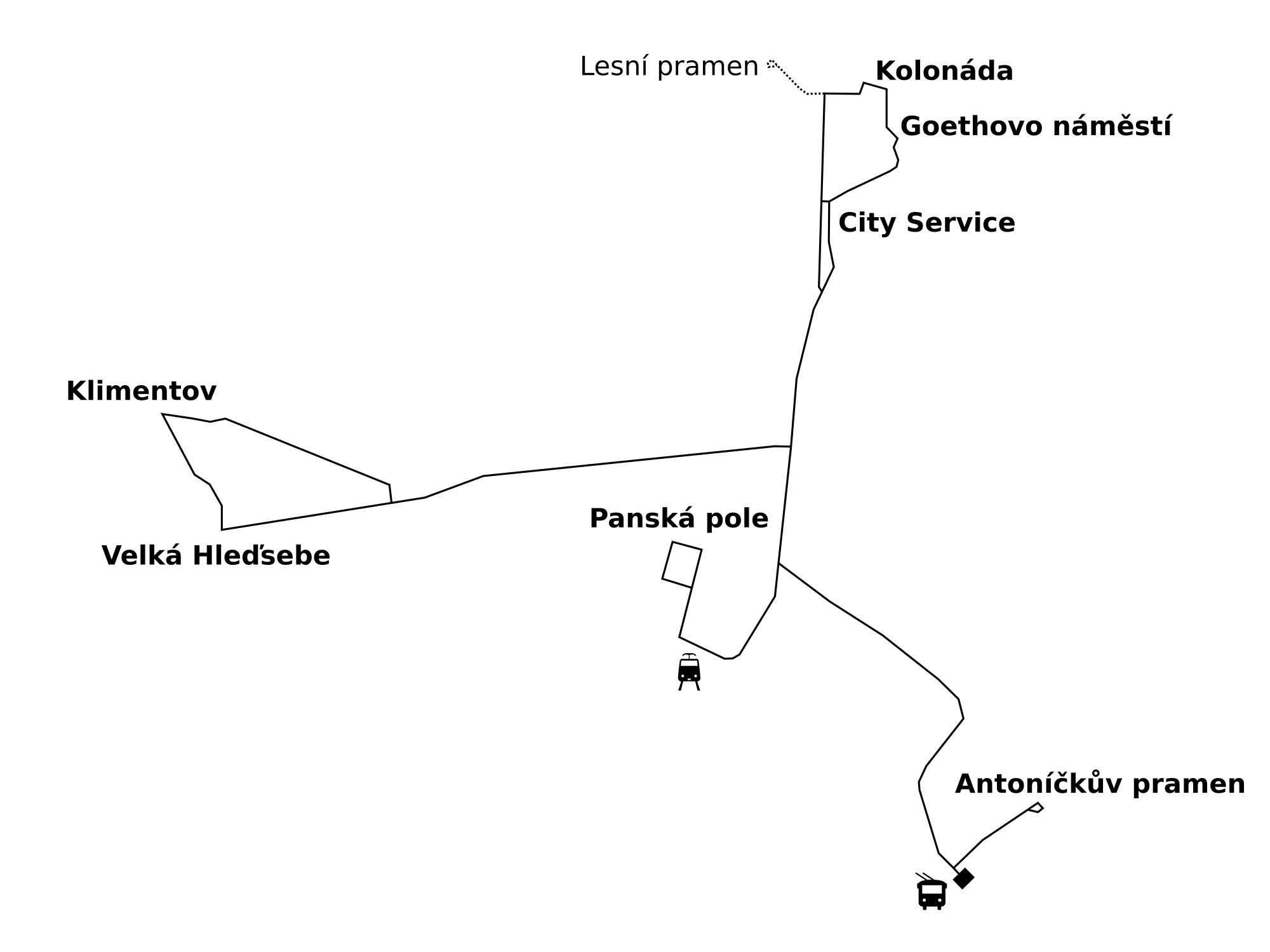
Trolleybus network map with the old decommissioned line to Lesní pramen (dotted). This map only covers the wired network, not battery operated trolleybus sections.

== Trolleybus lines in operation ==
There are currently 4 trolleybus lines in operation in Mariánské Lázně. Lines 6 and 7 require hybrid (currently diesel/electric) trolleybuses to service small parts of the network not-equipped with overhead wires.

Line number	Terminus A	Terminus B	Note
3	Antoníčkův pramen	Kolonáda	Workdays only
5	Panská Pole	Kolonáda	Weekends and public holidays only
6	City service	Klimentov	
7	Antoníčkův pramen	Kolonáda	

== Post Velvet Revolution history ==
Since the fall of the communism in 1989 the system had to deal with under-maintenance and a few attempts to close the system. Thanks to two waves of last-minute support, first in 2004-2006 and the second one since 2017 lasting up until now, the system persisted up until today.

=== Late 90s and early 2000s ===
Since the second half of 1990s the town's council tried to get rid of the trolleybus network claiming high maintenance costs. The fact the network was under-maintained and the vehicles were old did not make the situation any better. However, thanks to strong citizen reactions against the removal of such network it was finally decided to purchase new trolleybuses. In between the years 2004 and 2006 seven new Škoda 24tr vehicles were purchased, partially using EU funds.

One of the Škoda 24Tr vehicles was a prototype and started its service in 2004 after which all the other newer trolleybuses started appearing in the town. Another was initially designed for Zlín, but as it caught fire while transported to Zlín the public transport company there decided to reject this vehicle. However it was repaired by Škoda Transportation and was later in operation in Mariánské Lázně with an unusual colour combination. Three of 7 Škoda 24Tr units were equipped with a diesel generator to extend the trolleybus network reach.

=== 2012 ===
Since 2012 only 2 older Škoda 14Tr vehicles remained as a backup. However another Škoda 14TrM (a modernized version of Škoda 14Tr) was purchased from the public transport company in Plzeň in the same year.

=== 2013 – 2015 ===
Another attempt to close the system started with the council's decision made in September 2013. It was decided to slowly replace trolleybuses with buses and eventually battery powered buses. Other quicker variant of stopping the service sooner was not possible as there was an EU restriction in place on a new bus terminal near the main railway station which is also used by trolleybuses. Since EU fond helped financing the terminal they expected it to stay intact and work the way it was designed to at least till 2017.

Since a new town council was elected and the new representatives decided to open talks with public and with specialists, which claimed trolleybuses with batteries are more feasible than plain battery powered buses, it was decided the trolleybus network will stay. The following pros were stated in favour of the existing trolleybus network:

- Although maintenance cost are slightly higher than in case of battery buses, the infrastructure is already there and there is no need to build new charging stations
- There is currently very little experience with plain battery powered buses
- Battery buses would need more batteries to be able to cover the same area current trolleybus and bus network cover and therefore (as the batteries are heavy) would consume more power than trolleybuses equipped with less batteries only enough to extend the wired network
- Trolleybus network is more reliable as the power input is ensured over the static wires, while with batteries only there is a higher chance something may go wrong – e.g. in Berlin the electro-bus reliability is about 40% and that is not feasible for a small town like Mariánské Lázně where such vehicles would take over the whole transportation system and where even a small issue would be felt
- Trolleybuses with batteries can charge while in operation so there is less or even no need for the vehicles to keep still and wait until they charge
- Trolleybus network may attract some tourists, especially an unusual network such as the one in Mariánské Lázně

=== 2018 - 2020 ===
In 2018 the two remaining Škoda 14Tr trolleybuses that were in operation in Mariásnké Lázně since the beginning were sold to Lviv. Then in July 2019 the last remaining Škoda 14TrM was sold as well.

In August 2019 the public transport company in Mariánské Lázně signed up a contract with Škoda Electric purchasing 8 new Škoda 30Tr trolleybuses equipped with batteries to allow autonomous operation for sections outside wires. These new vehicles were then delivered in April and May 2020. All the Škoda 24Tr trolleybuses were removed starting from March 2020 up until August 2020.

=== 2023 ===
In 2023, major investments were made to upgrade the outgoing substation as well as wired section in larger areas, including the city center loop or the area near the depot up to the Antoníčkův pramen loop where a new overhead track was added allowing easier manipulation and multiple trolleybus charging at the same time.

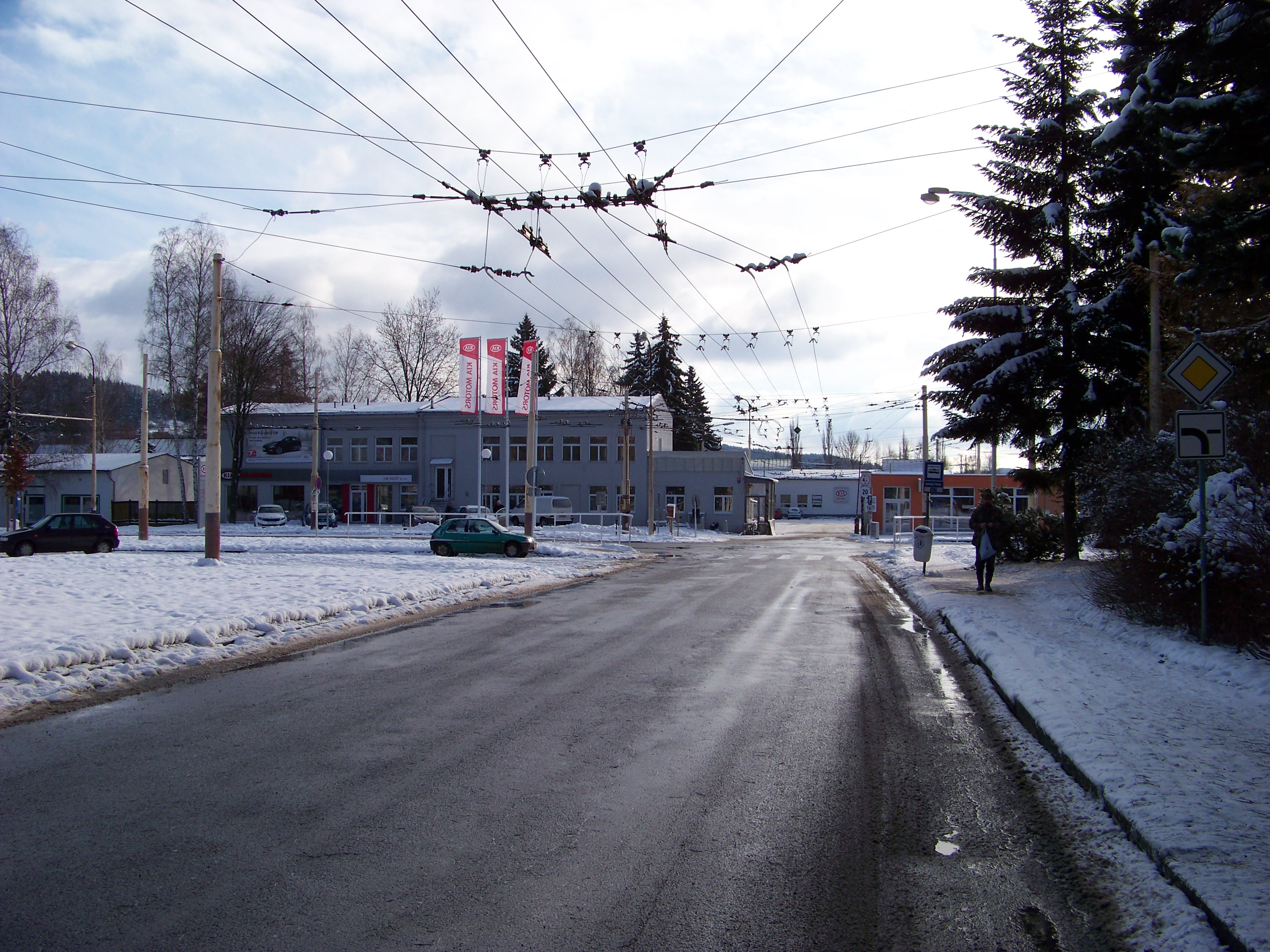
Worn-out wired network in Mariánzké Lázně near the Trolleybus depot

== The wired network state ==
In recent years and especially in 2023 investments were made to greatly improve the situation of a previously worn out wired network. In contrast to other Czech cities, it was obvious the network was under-maintained for a long time, and still is in some areas. But even the long lasting and very old components, including the ancient high angle Power-on/Power-off type switches (which were no longer in use anywhere in the Czech Republic for decades) were finally removed from the streets. Newer radio-controlled switches started appearing in 2013 and were initially a second-hand merchandise from Plzeň. But with the upgrades made in 2023 a large part of the wires was replaced with new ones, especially in the area of the old city, but also near the depot.

Another major issue was the old and outgoing substation which was in the need of a quick replacement. It was one of the aspects that council used as an argument trying to remove the system altogether in 2013 (the same argument city council in a New Zealand's Wellington city successfully used to close their trolleybus system in 2017). Fortunately in this instance, it was finally upgraded in 2023 with all new components.

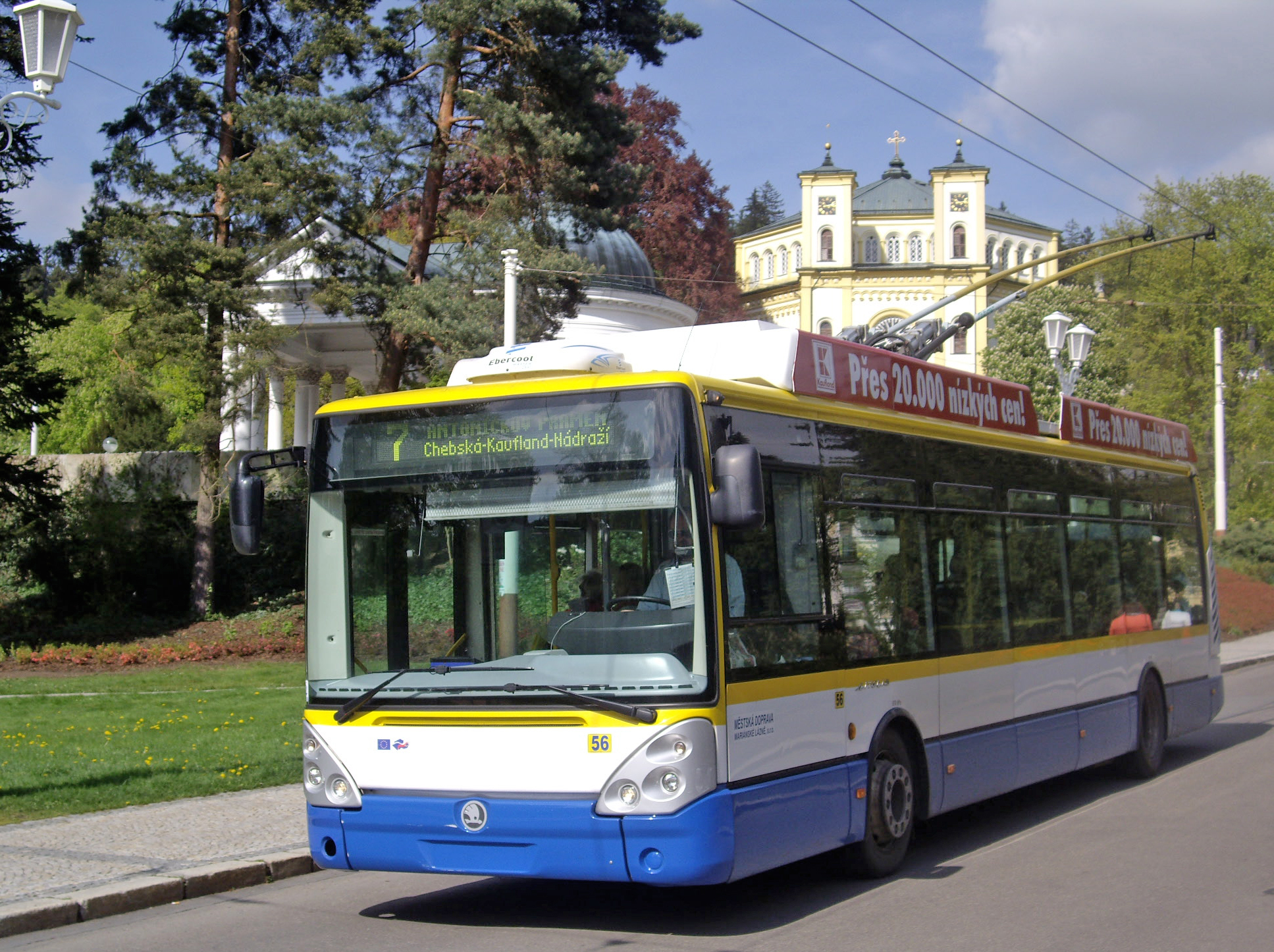
Škoda 24Tr Citelis in Mariánské Lázně

== Current fleet ==
The below table lists all trolleybuses currently in operation in Mariánské Lázně.

Vehicle type	Count	Note
Škoda 30Tr SOR	8	All 8 vehicles delivered in April and May 2020
