= Trolleybuses in Varna =

Bulgarian transit system

Coordinates: 43°11′53″N 27°54′44″E

Varna trolleybus system
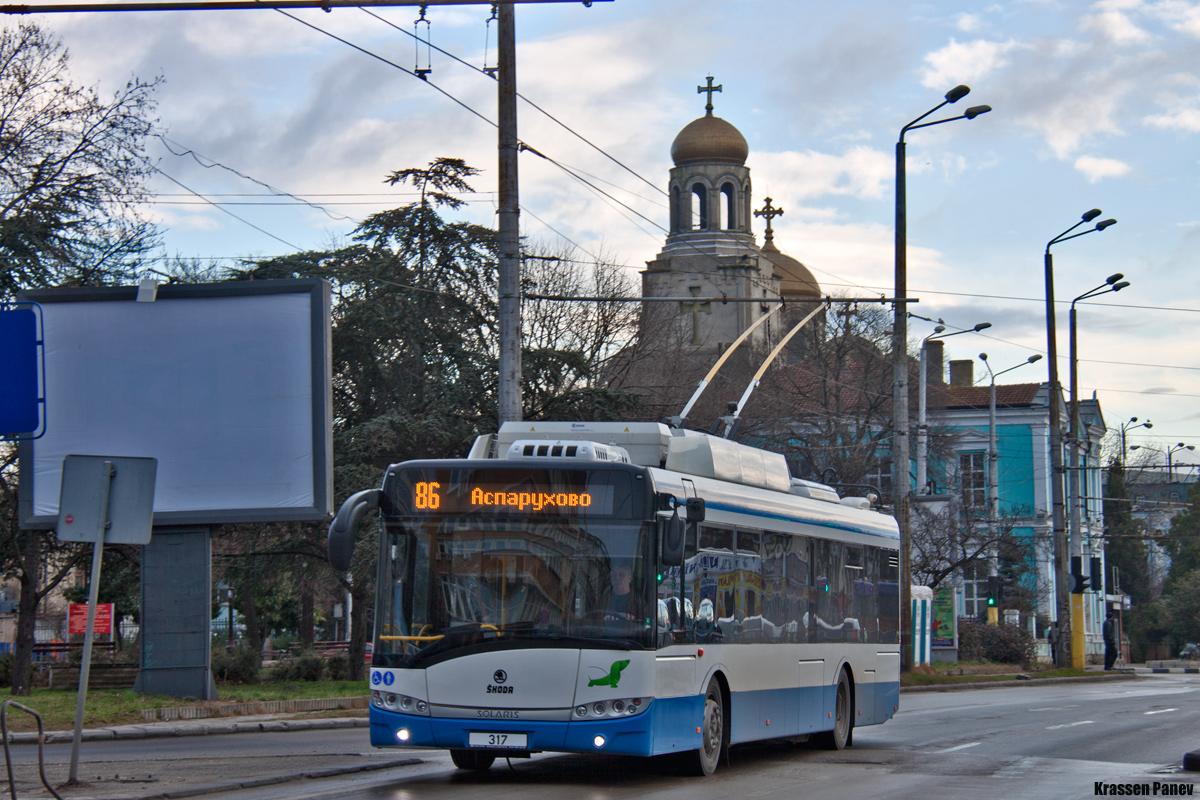
- A Škoda 26Tr Solaris trolleybus in Varna, 2016.

Operation
- Locale: Varna, Bulgaria
- Open: 1 January 1986
- Status: Open
- Routes: 3
- Operator: Gradski Transport ATP

Infrastructure
- Depot: 1
- Stock: 32 trolleybuses

Statistics
- Website: http://www.gtvarna.com/ Gradski Transport ATP (in Bulgarian)

The trolleybus system forms part of the public transport network of Varna, the third most populous city in Bulgaria.

== History ==
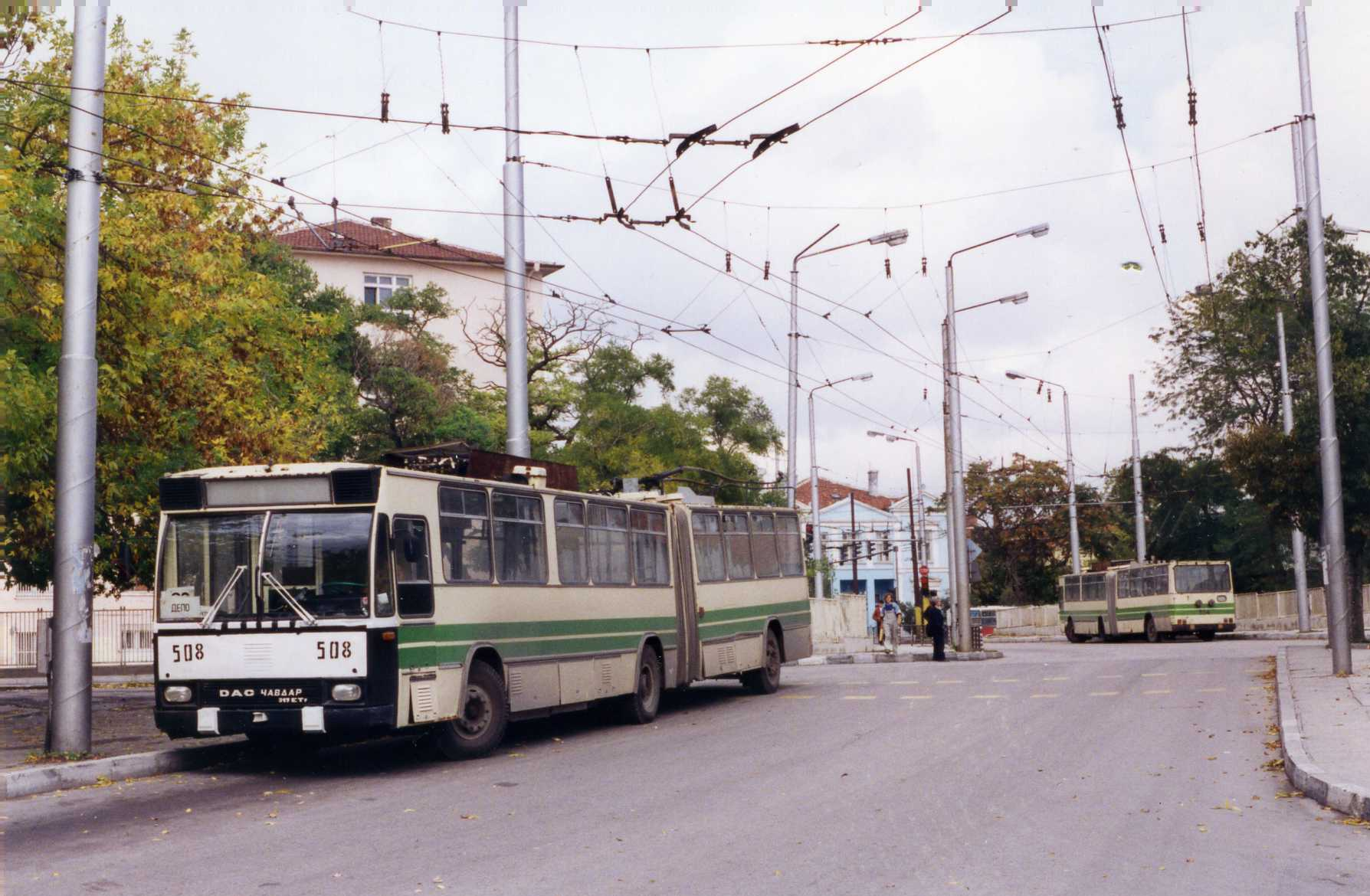
A DAC-Chavdar 317ETR trolleybus in 1993

The system was opened on January 1, 1986; it was the 4th network to open in Bulgaria after Sofia, Plovdiv and just a few months earlier Pleven.

Initially the network expanded rapidly, reaching its peak of 8 lines at some point. First the city received 15 new trolleybus Skoda 14TR and 3 used Skoda 9TR from Sofia and Plovdiv, the latter ones were used for training purposes. The following years the city received 15 more new Skoda 14TR and 36 new articulated DAC-Chavdar.

In 1999 the city bought 3 used Skoda 14TR (one of them modernized) from Czechia.

In 2003 the city bought 5 used Skoda 15TR from Czechia to replace the already out of service DAC-Chavdar vehicles. Additional 4 used Skoda 15 TR were bought from Czechia and Slovakia in 2007.

In 2017 all Skoda 15TR were taken out of service due to a fire that burnt down one of them.

In 2014 along with 3 other cities Varna was granted money through a European Union program to purchase 30 new trolleybuses Skoda Solaris 26TR which replaced all remaining Skoda 14TR (Two units were kept to be used for training purposes).

== Lines ==
=== Current routes ===
Line	Route	Notes
82	Rail Station - City center - bul Slivnica - Vladislav Varnenchik (block 407)	
83	Rail Station - City center - bul Slivnica - Mladost - TIS North	Monday through Friday only
88	Asparuhovo - City Center - Mladost - Vladislav Varnenchik (block 407)	

=== Previous routes ===
Line	Route	Notes
81	Neptun terminus - bul Slivnica - Vladislav Varnenchik (block 407)	Initially terminated at Konstantin Fruzhin stop before the line was extended to block 407
81A/82A	Rail Station - City center - bul Slivnica - Vladislav Varnenchik (via Yanko Mustakov street)	Line 81A terminated at “Neptun” stop
84	Pochivka- City Center - Varna Shipyard	
85	Cherno More AD - bul Slivnica - City Center - Varna Shipyard	The infrastructure from bul Slivnica to Cherno More AD has been dismantled
86/86A	Pochivka - Rail Station	86A terminated at Srednoshkolska stop in the evenings
87	Cherno More AD - bul Slivnica - Vladislav Varchenchik (block 407)	The infrastructure from bul Slivnica to Cherno More AD has been dismantled

== Fleet ==
=== Current fleet ===
Brand	Quantity	Entered service
Skoda Solaris 26TR	30	2014
Skoda 14TR	2	1986-87

=== Former fleet ===
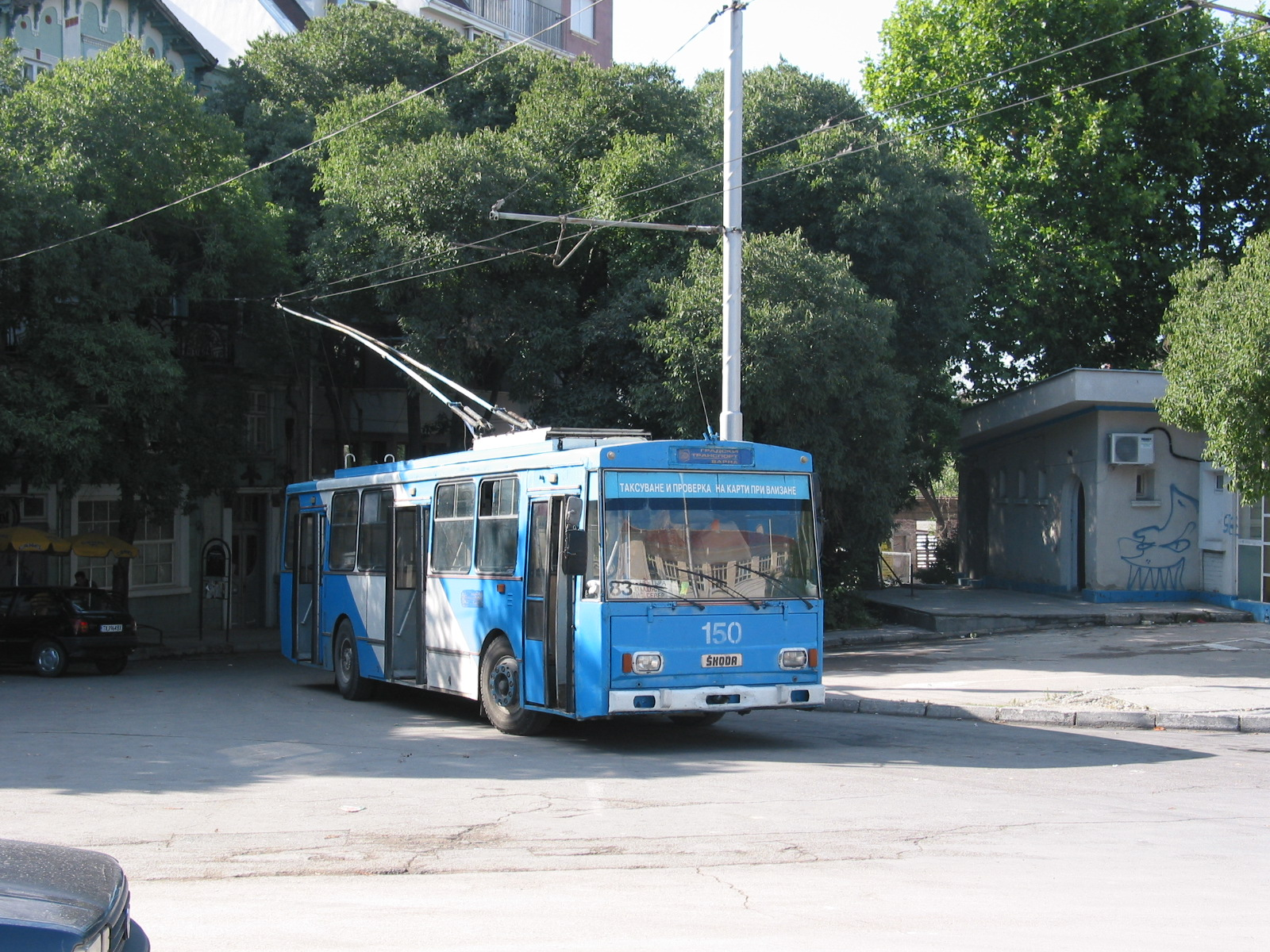
A Škoda 14Tr trolleybus on route 83. These vehicles were retired in 2015, except for two which are used for training purposes.

Brand	Quantity	Entered service	Retired	Comments
Skoda 14TR	33	1986-1987; 1999	2015	2 units were sold to Haskovo and 2 units were kept in Varna as training vehicles
Skoda 15TR	9	2003; 2007	2017	All vehicle pulled out of service due to an accidental fire on one of the vehicles.
Dac Chavdar 317ETr	36	1988-1990	2003	Vehicles were unreliable and with a lot of technical issues.
Skoda 9TR	3	1986	???	Used for training purposed only, received from Sofia and Plovdiv.

== See also ==
- Asparuhov most
- List of trolleybus systems
