= Trolleybuses in Jinan =

Transit in Shandong, China

Coordinates: 36°40′N 116°59′E

Jinan Trolleybus System
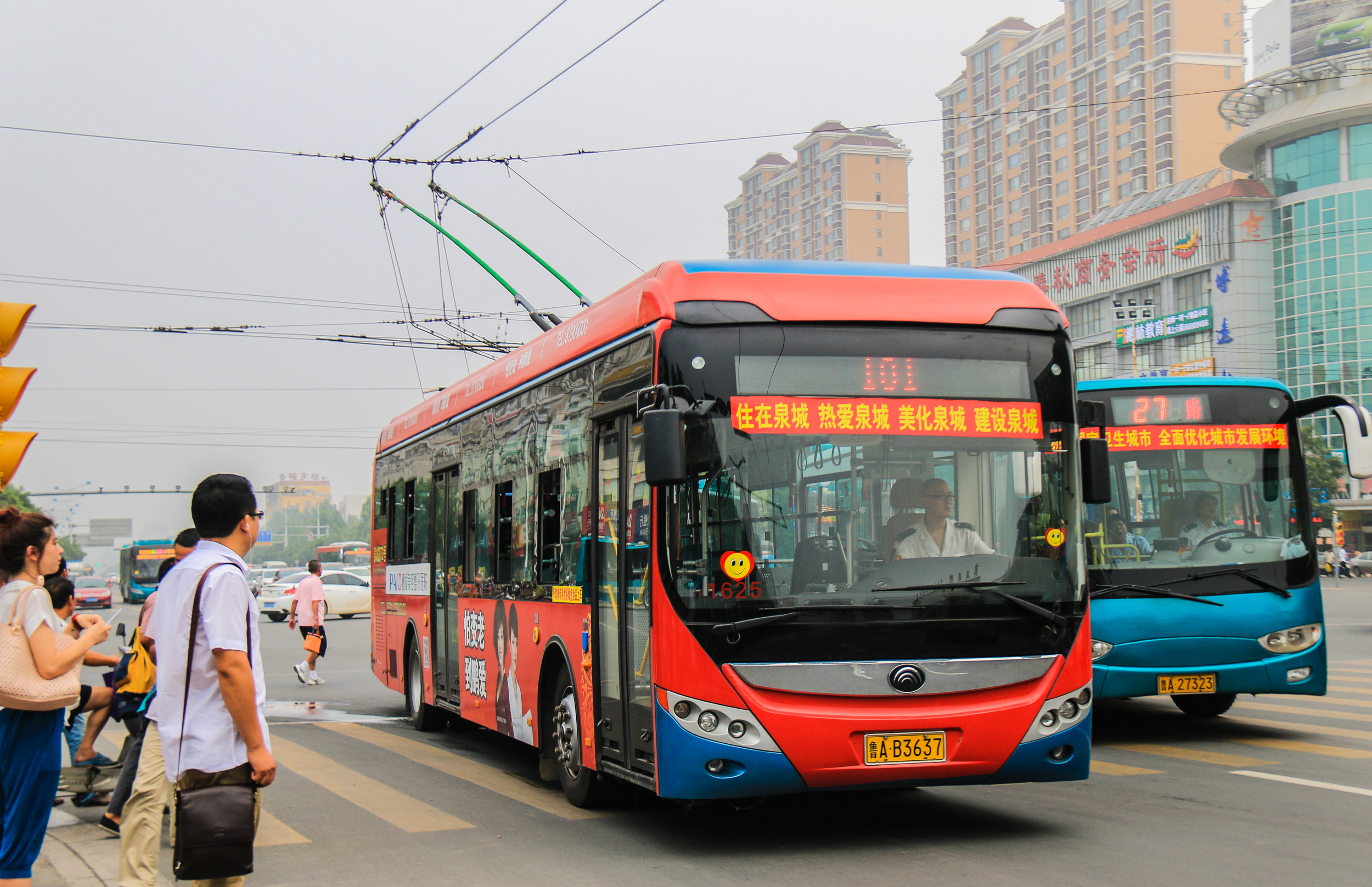
- A Yutong trolleybus in Jinan in 2014

Operation
- Locale: Jinan, Shandong, China
- Open: 1 January 1977
- Routes: 15
- Operators: Jinan Public Transport Group Co., Ltd (济南公共交通集团有限公司)

Infrastructure
- Electrification: 750 V DC

Statistics
- Website: http://www.jnbus.com.cn/ Jinan Public Transport Group (in Chinese)

The Jinan trolleybus system (Chinese: 济南无轨电车系统) serves the city of Jinan, in the province of Shandong, China. Opened in 1977, the system is operated by the Jinan Public Transport Corporation, and presently consists of 15 lines. As a result of significant expansion in the early 2020s, in the form of new trolleybus-BRT routes, the system has become the second-largest trolleybus system in China (after that of Beijing).

== History ==
The first trolleybus route in Jinan, route 1, was opened to public on 1 January 1977. In the same year, route 2 commenced operations. The routes were renumbered to 101 and 102 in 1992. In the late 1990s, two more routes, 103 and 104, were opened.

The first trolleybus with batteries was introduced on route 101 in March 2011, while the last trolleybuses without batteries were retired in August 2018, allowing greater flexibility of routing.

From 2020, a large BRT trolleybus network was constructed with loans from the Asian Development Bank. The original plan for 111.2 km of new trolleybus contact network was modified to a total of 60.8 km of new contact network and 15 km of upgraded network, with the other sections replaced by either electric buses or trolleybuses running on autonoumous course to "provide better city landscape", while also introducing a trolleybus museum to the plan.

On 20 September 2022, articulated LCK5180A trolleybuses started operations on BRT-1. Newer dual power trolleybuses serve the line, reducing the reliance on a contact network and reducing visual pollution. Due to this design, trolleybuses enter and exit the depots on autonoumous course, and BRT-10 also partially drives on battery power for part of its route.

== Routes ==
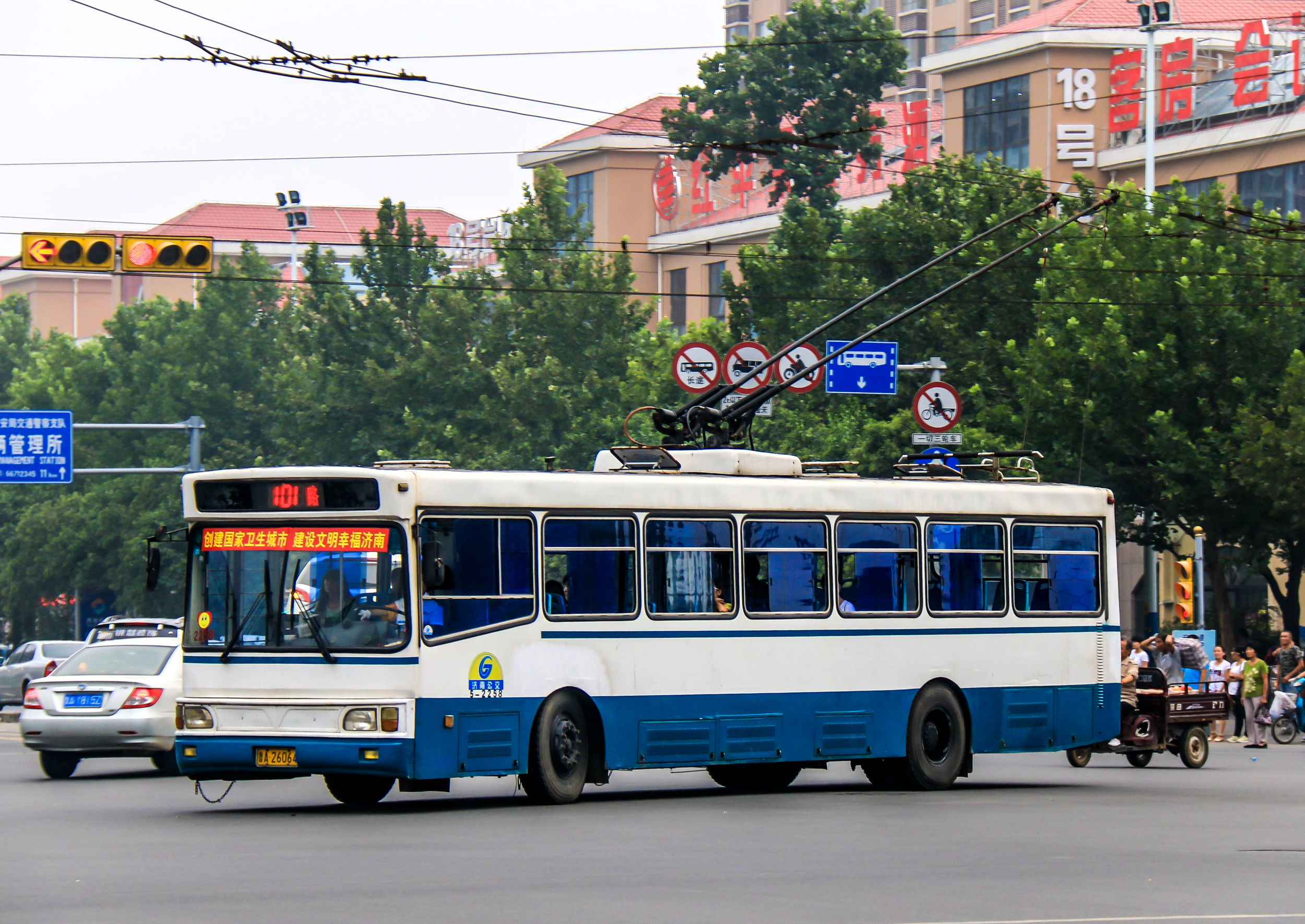
A now-withdrawn JK6120D trolleybus on route 101 in 2014

Route	Route	Length	
B70			
K101	Jinan University (济南大学) – Dianliuzhuang (甸柳庄)	16.5 km	24 hour route
K102	Jinan University (济南大学) – Gejiazhuang (葛家庄)	13.6 km	Has night service
B103	Yanquan (砚泉) – Daguanyuan (大观园)	10.3 km	
K125	Baimashan Bus Station (白马山停车场) — Chengfengqiao (成丰桥)		
BRT-1	Jinanxi Station Bus Terminal (济南西站公交枢纽) – Quanfu Flyover West (全福立交桥西)	17.0 km	Has night service
BRT-5			
BRT-6	北全福 (Beiquanfu) — 省立医院东院区 (Shandong Provincial Hospital East Campus)		
BRT-7	Jinan University (济南大学) – Zouzhuangxincun (邹庄新村)	15.0 km	
BRT-10	Fenghuangshan Flyover (凤凰山立交桥) – Huanggang Rd. (黄岗路)	11.7 km	

== Fleet ==
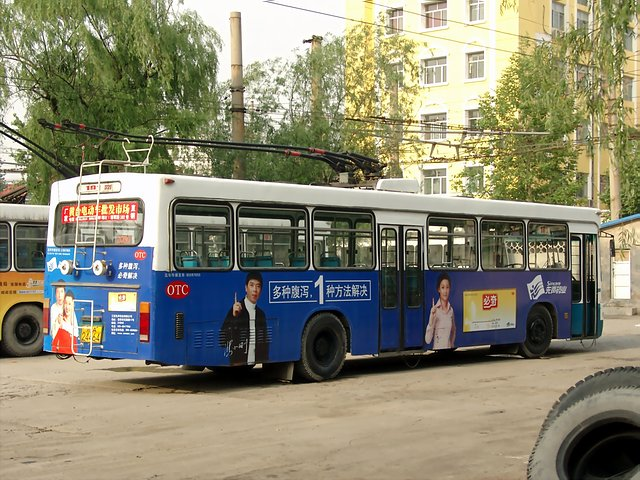
One of the JK6120D-model trolleybuses in 2006, when still fitted with a rollsign route indicator. Note the "wrap"-type advertisement.

From the early 2000s to 2013, the only model of trolleybus used in Jinan was the JK6120D, manufactured by China National Heavy Duty Truck Group (Chinese: 中国重型汽车集团有限公司), or Sinotruk, which is based in Jinan. In earlier years, Jinan also employed some second-hand SK561G articulated trolleybuses purchased from Luoyang; those 1980s-models were all retired before 2007. In 2014, the entire fleet was replaced by dual-mode trolleybuses manufactured by Yutong and Zhongtong Bus. These new trolleybuses featured air-conditioning, low-floor access, leather-covered seats, "maternal-and-child" seats and LED destination signs. In the early 2020s, 250 Zhongtong LCK5120A trolleybuses were added to the fleet.

As part of the ADB-funded BRT trolleybus project, 385 trolleybuses were ordered, modified from the original 735.

== Expansion ==
The Jinan Government drafted a plan to expand the trolleybus system into a "Three Horizontal Five Vertical" Trolleybus BRT network by 2021. 292 articulated and 443 rigid trolleybuses were ordered to service the expansion. Jinan BRT 1 and 7 will be the first to convert over to trolleybus operation by 2019.

A trolleybus museum was introduced into the BRT trolleybus plan with a purpose of reshaping the public's perspective on trolleybuses. It was eventually completed as part of the bus museum, with exhibits showcasing various trolleybus related equipments.

== See also ==
- List of trolleybus systems
- Transport in the People's Republic of China
