= Trolleybuses in Lublin =

Trolleybus network in Lublin, Poland

Lublin Trolleybus Network
- Trolleybus in Lublin

Overview
- Native name: Trolejbusy w Lublinie
- Area served: Lublin
- Transit type: Trolleybus
- Number of lines: 13
- Website: https://mpk.lublin.pl/

Operation
- Began operation: 1953
- Operator: MPK Lublin
- Number of vehicles: 129
System map
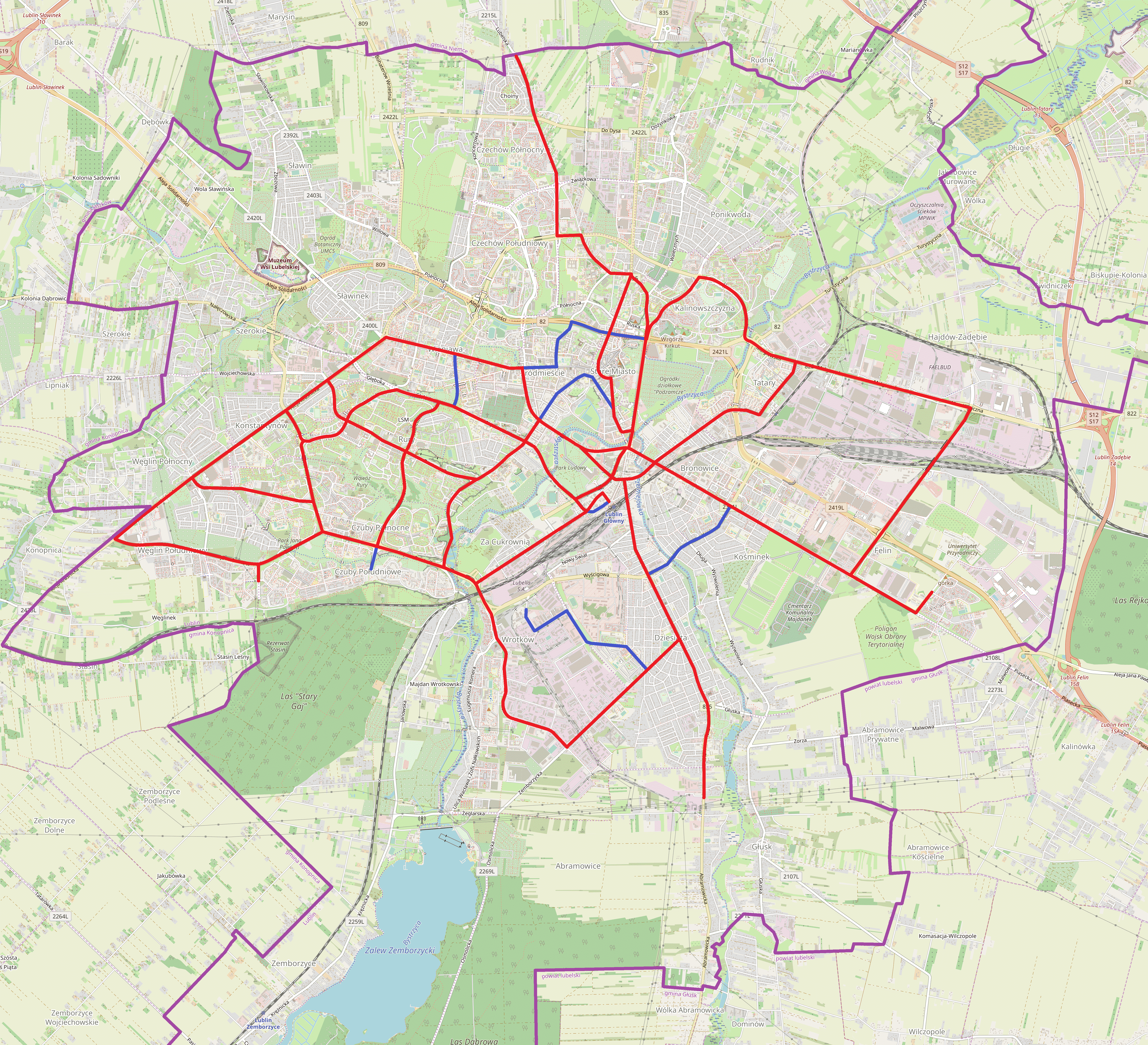

The Lublin trolleybus is a trolleybus network serving Lublin metropolitan area in Poland. It is one of the four Polish cities that currently have such a network, along with Gdynia, Sopot and Tychy.

== Main lines ==
Line	Map	Route	Stops	Time
150		Osiedle Poręba – Granitowa – Jana Pawła II – Al. Kraśnicka – Bohaterów Monte Cassino – Wileńska – Głęboka – Sowińskiego – Al. Racławickie – Krakowskie Przedmieście – 3 Maja – Al. Tysiąclecia – Lwowska – Al. Andersa – Mełgiewska – Mełgiewska WSEI (Mełgiewska – Grygowej – Pancerniaków)	20–25 (6)	38 min. (47 min.)
151		Abramowice – Abramowicka – Kunickiego – pl. Bychawski – al. Piłsudskiego – Lipowa – Al. Racławickie – al. Kraśnicka – Węglin	25	44 min.
152		Plac Dworcowy – Stadionowa – Muzyczna – Nadbystrzycka – Zana – Filaretów – Jana Pawła II – Granitowa – Osiedle Poręba	15–16	21 min.
153		Pancerniaków – Grygowej – Dekutowskiego – Droga Męczenników Majdanka – Fabryczna – Al. Zygmuntowskie – al. Piłsudskiego – Narutowicza – Głęboka – Wileńska – Bohaterów Monte Cassino – Armii Krajowej – Orkana – Roztocze – al. Kraśnicka – Węglin	23	47 min.
154		Węglin – al. Kraśnicka – Roztocze – Orkana – Armii Krajowej – Bohaterów Monte Cassino – Zana – Filaretów – Głęboka – Muzyczna – Stadionowa – Młyńska – Dworcowa – Młyńska (powrót: Dworcowa – Gazowa – Młyńska) – Stadionowa – Lubelskiego Lipca '80 – al. Unii Lubelskiej – Podzamcze – Unicka – Obywatelska – Chodźki – Chodźki – szpital	25–26	40 min.
155		Pancerniaków – Grygowej – Mełgiewska – Gospodarcza – Hutnicza – Łęczyńska – Wolska – pl. Bychawski – al. Piłsudskiego – Lipowa – Al. Racławickie – al. Kraśnicka – Zana – Zana ZUS	27–28	42 min.
156		Felin – Doświadczalna – Franczaka „Lalka” – Droga Męczenników Majdanka – Fabryczna – al. Unii Lubelskiej – Zamojska – Kard.St.Wyszyńskiego – Królewska – Lubartowska – Obywatelska – Chodźki – Al. Smorawińskiego – Szeligowskiego – Choiny – Choiny	24	38 min.
157		Zana Leclerc – Zana – Filaretów – Jana Pawła II – Krochmalna – Diamentowa – Zemborzycka – Kunickiego – Dywizjonu 303 – Krańcowa – Droga Męczenników Majdanka – Franczaka „Lalka” – Doświadczalna – Felin	27–29	42 min.
158		Felin – Doświadczalna – Franczaka „Lalka” – Droga Męczenników Majdanka – Fabryczna – Al. Zygmuntowskie – al. Piłsudskiego – Lipowa – Al. Racławickie – al. Kraśnicka – Zana – Zana ZUS	22	41 min.
159		Osiedle Poręba – Granitowa – Jana Pawła II – Armii Krajowej – Bohaterów Monte Cassino – Wileńska – Głęboka – Narutowicza – Bernardyńska – Zamojska – Fabryczna – Łęczyńska – Hutnicza – Gospodarcza – Mełgiewska – Mełgiewska WSEI (Mełgiewska – Grygowej – Pancerniaków)	22 (6)	42 min. (51 min.)
160		Osiedle Poręba – Granitowa – Jana Pawła II – Filaretów – Jana Pawła II – Krochmalna – Diamentowa – Zemborzycka – Kunickiego – Pl. Bychawski – Wolska – Fabryczna – al. Unii Lubelskiej – Zamojska – Kard. St. Wyszyńskiego – Królewska – Lubartowska – Obywatelska – Chodźki – Al. Smorawińskiego – Szeligowskiego – Choiny – Choiny	36	56 min.
161		Osiedle Poręba – Granitowa – Jana Pawła II – al. Kraśnicka – Bohaterów Monte Cassino – Zana – Nadbystrzycka – Krochmalna – Gazowa – Dworzec Główny PKP – Dworcowa – Młyńska – Stadionowa – Lubelskiego Lipca '80 – plac Bychawski – Wolska – Droga Męczenników Majdanka – Franczaka „Lalka” – Doświadczalna – Felin	36	57 min.
162		Osiedle Poręba – Granitowa – Jana Pawła II – Armii Krajowej – Bohaterów Monte Cassino – Zana – Nadbystrzycka – Krochmalna – Diamentowa – Zemborzycka – Herberta – Inżynierska	28	35 min.

== Fleet ==
Photo	Type	In usage	Manufactured	Quantity
	Solaris Trollino 12M	2007	2007	3
	Solaris Trollino 12AC	2008	2008	1
	MAZ 203T8M	2010	2009	1
	SAM MPK Lublin II	2011	–	3
	Solaris Trollino 12S	2011	2011–2012	30
	Solaris Trollino 12MB	2013	2013–2014	20
	Bogdan/Ursus T701.16	2013	2013–2015	38
	Solaris Trollino 18M	2014	2014	12
	Ursus CS18T	2018	–	15

=== Museum fleet ===
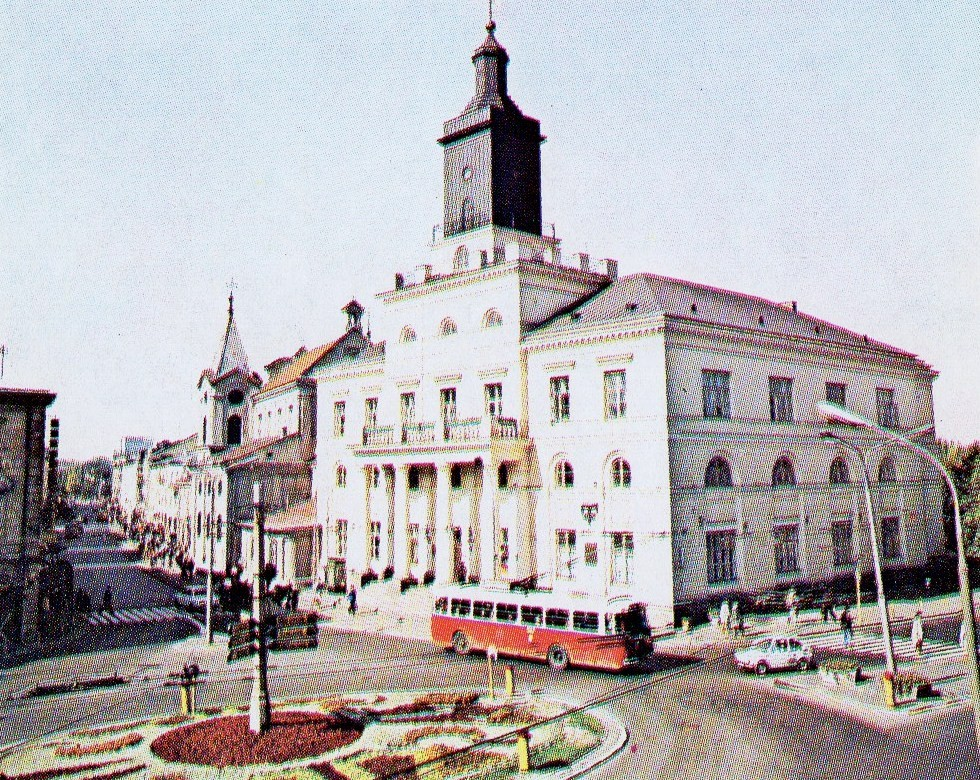
Škoda 9Tr in 1977

Photo	Type	In usage	Quantity
	ZiU-9	1985–2000	1
	Škoda 9Tr	–	1
