= In-motion charging electric bus =

Electric bus that charges from overhead wires while driving

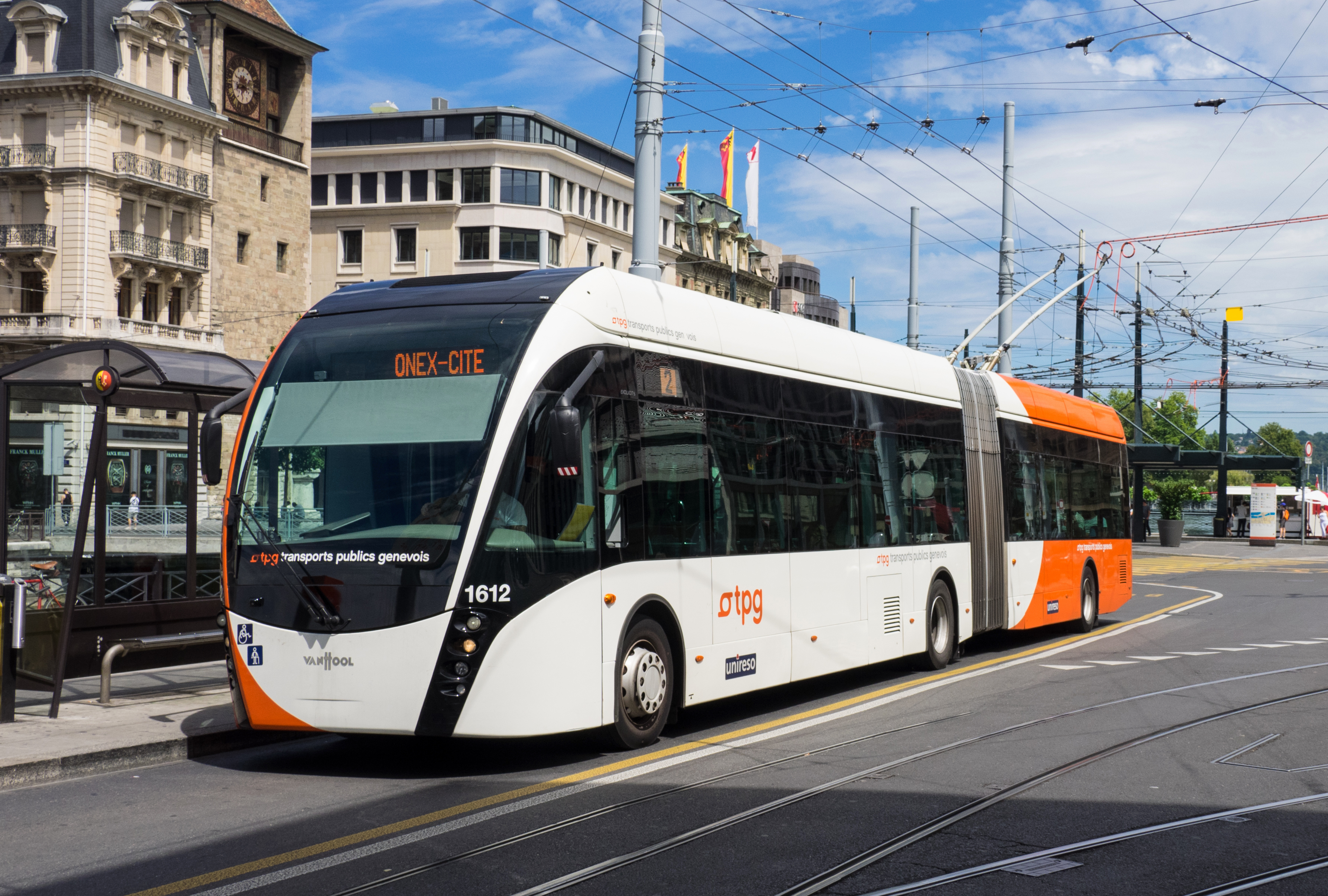
Van Hool Exqui.City with IMC from catenary in Geneva

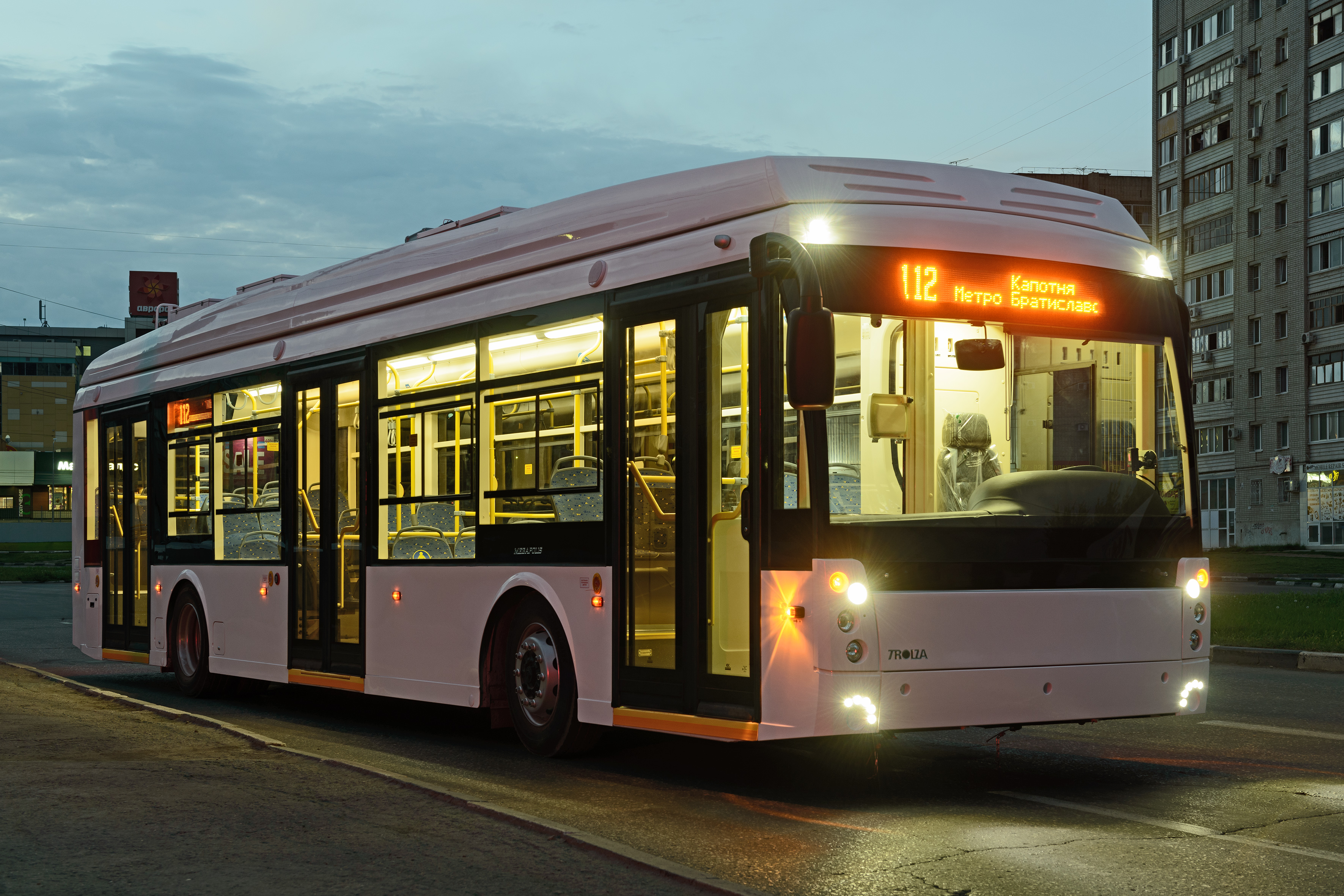
Trolza-5265 "Megapolis" in battery mode

In-motion charging (IMC) electric bus, also known as a battery trolleybus or trolleybus with extended autonomous run, is an electrically powered public transport vehicle that draws power from an overhead contact network (catenary) via trolley poles while simultaneously charging an on-board traction battery. This technology allows the vehicle to operate continuously: drawing power and charging while under the overhead wires, and operating as a battery electric bus on sections of the route lacking this infrastructure.

This concept is an evolution of the traditional trolleybus, developing from vehicles with small auxiliary power units for emergency use to modern systems where vehicles can cover significant distances autonomously, often between 15 to 70 kilometres (9.3 to 43.5 mi).

IMC systems are being actively implemented by major metropolises (e.g., Beijing, Saint Petersburg, Mexico City) and in transport networks across developed countries (e.g. Switzerland, Germany, The Netherlands). Modern In-Motion Charging systems can offer significant cost advantages over fully battery-electric bus networks.

Studies indicate that upgrading existing trolleybus infrastructure to IMC can reduce capital costs for rolling stock by approximately 50% and lower operational expenses by around 20% over a 15-year lifecycle compared to new battery-electric bus fleets. When building an IMC system from scratch with partial overhead lines, capital expenditures can still be lower than a fully battery-based system, due to reduced battery capacity requirements, a smaller fleet size and eliminated downtime during charging.

== Terminology ==
The term In-Motion Charging (IMC) was introduced as a branding concept by Erik Lenz of Vossloh Kiepe (now Kiepe Electric) in 2014 during the trolley:motion conference in Hamburg. The terminology was intended to improve the public perception of trolleybuses by highlighting their key advantage over static-charging electric buses: the ability to recharge batteries while transporting passengers, eliminating stationary charging times.

In Germany, the term BOB (Batterie-Oberleitungs-Bus, Battery-Overhead-Bus) is also used by some operators, such as in Solingen. In Arnhem (Netherlands), the concept is often referred to as Trolley 2.0.

In Russia and CIS countries, these vehicles are often referred to as a Trolleybus with Extended Autonomous Run (Russian: Троллейбус с увеличенным автономным ходом, abbreviated as TUAH) or an Electrobus with dynamic charging.

== History ==
=== Gas or diesel powered dual mode buses ===
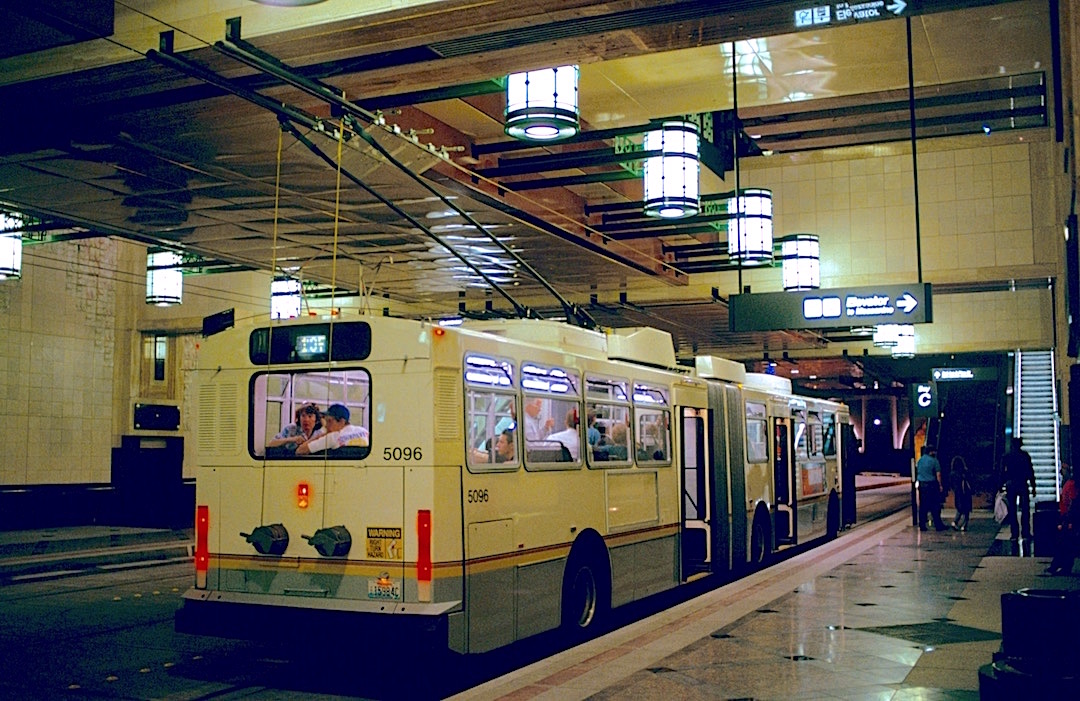
A dual-mode bus operating as a trolleybus in the Downtown Seattle Transit Tunnel in 1990

The concept of a trolleybus operating away from overhead wires dates back to the end of the 19th century. While the word trolleybus originates from 1882, when Werner von Siemens presented an early electrically powered vehicle, the idea of off-wire capability evolved to allow flexibility.

In 1899, a vehicle appeared in Berlin that defied easy classification—part electric tram, part automobile. It featured a bow-type current collector mounted on its roof and a body resembling a streetcar, complete with three windows. Instead of conventional rail wheels, it rolled on four wooden wheels with iron tires—much like those found on a horse-drawn cart—supplemented by two smaller, flanged wheels positioned ahead of the front axle. Designed by the German firm Siemens & Halske, this curious hybrid—a cross between an electric tram and an automobile, and essentially a battery-powered trolleybus—served as the world’s first trolleybus, paving the way for the advancements we see today. When operating on tracks equipped with overhead lines, the vehicle drew power via its bow-type current collector; when traveling on streets without tracks, it switched to its onboard storage batteries. While on the tracks, the vehicle was guided by the two small, flanged wheels at the front. Upon moving onto regular streets, these guide wheels were retracted, and the bow-type current collector was lowered. The propulsion system consisted of four 4-horsepower electric motors, each driving one of the four wheels independently. This design—utilizing overhead lines whenever available—allowed for a smaller battery capacity, which in turn helped reduce the vehicle's overall weight.

It garnered significant attention for its efficiency, as the batteries could be recharged while the vehicle was drawing power from the overhead lines.

In the United States, the Public Service Company of New Jersey, in conjunction with the Yellow Coach Manufacturing Company, developed "All Service Vehicles" (ASVs) between 1935 and 1948. These were early trackless trolleys capable of operating as gas-electric buses when off-wire.

Before the maturation of high-capacity lithium batteries (which enable modern In-Motion Charging), term dual-mode bus was used for off-wire vehicles utilizing overhead wires for electric power and a separate, full-sized diesel engine for surface travel. Notable examples included:

- Seattle: King County Metro used special-order articulated Breda buses in the Downtown Seattle Transit Tunnel from 1990 to 2005. These vehicles operated as trolleybuses underground to eliminate diesel emissions in the tunnel, and switched to diesel engines for surface street operations.
- Boston: The Massachusetts Bay Transportation Authority (MBTA) used dual-mode buses on the Silver Line (Waterfront) route from 2004 until 2023. Similar to Seattle, the electric mode was utilized to manage air quality within the system's tunnels. They were eventually replaced by diesel hybrids and battery-electric buses.

From the 1980s onward, systems began purchasing trolleybuses equipped with auxiliary power units (APUs) — small diesel engines or batteries — to allow them to bypass route blockages or travel short distances without overhead lines, with notable adopters including Muni in San Francisco, TransLink in Vancouver, and Beijing. Examples include the approximately 300 vehicles in San Francisco and the trolleybuses used on the 2005-opened system in Rome, Italy, which can run short distances on battery power before needing recharging, with Rome’s vehicles using batteries only on the final 500 metres of an 11.5-km route. Such vehicles are generally not considered dual-mode buses, but are also the precursors of IMC.

=== Shift to IMC ===
With the development of battery technology (specifically Li-ion) in recent years, the focus shifted from diesel auxiliary units to purely electric autonomy. In Shanghai, experiments began in 2006 with "capacitor energy storage" electric buses that charged at stops. By the 2010s, the "TROLLEY project" in Central Europe was established to promote sustainable trolleybus strategies, leading to the widespread adoption of In-Motion Charging to extend routes without installing additional overhead wires. In 2018, Solaris Bus & Coach unveiled the "Trollino 24", a double-articulated 24-meter IMC bus designed for high-capacity routes, setting a benchmark for future BRT-style electric transit.

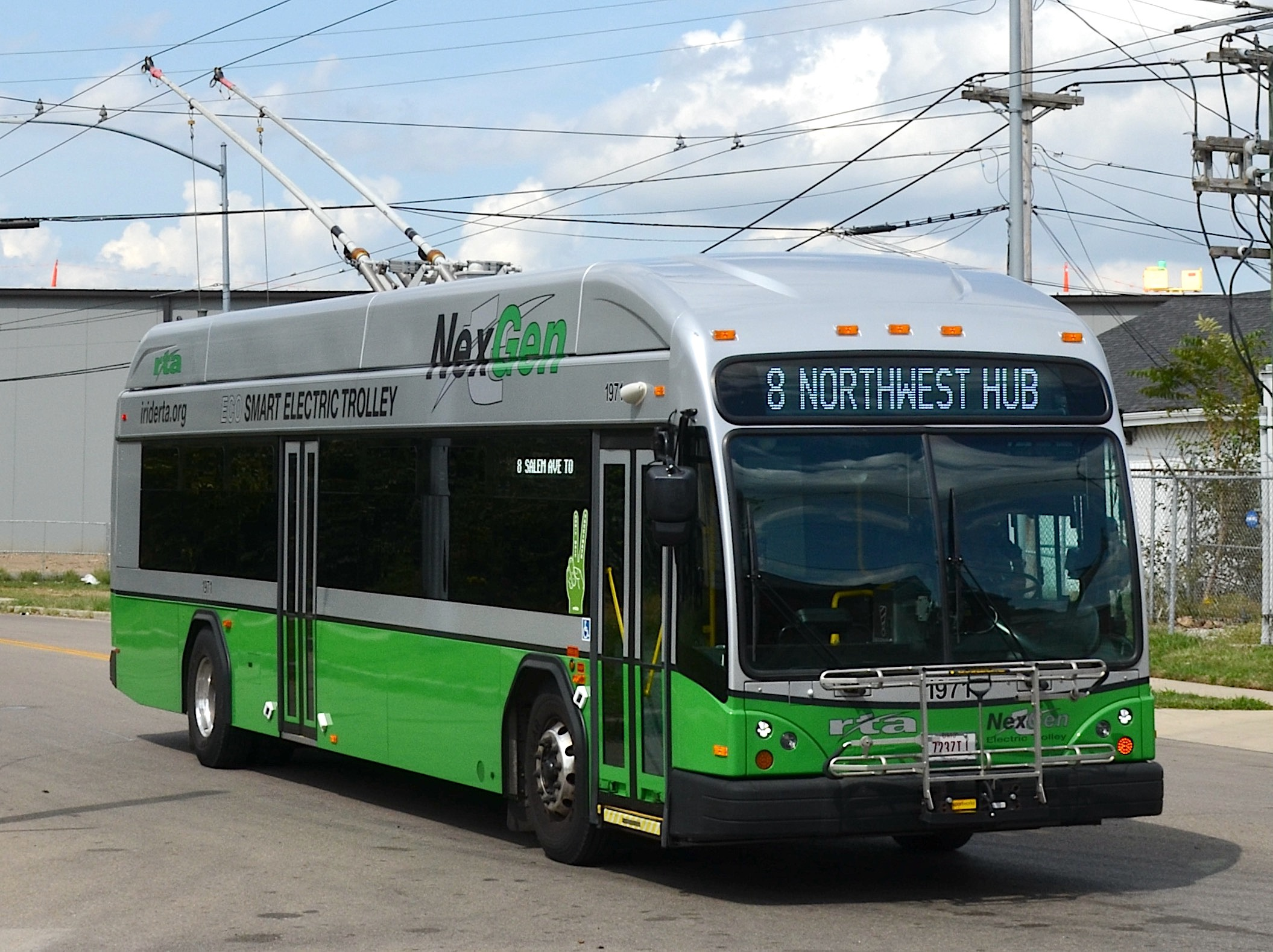
IMC electric bus in Dayton, US

== Technology ==
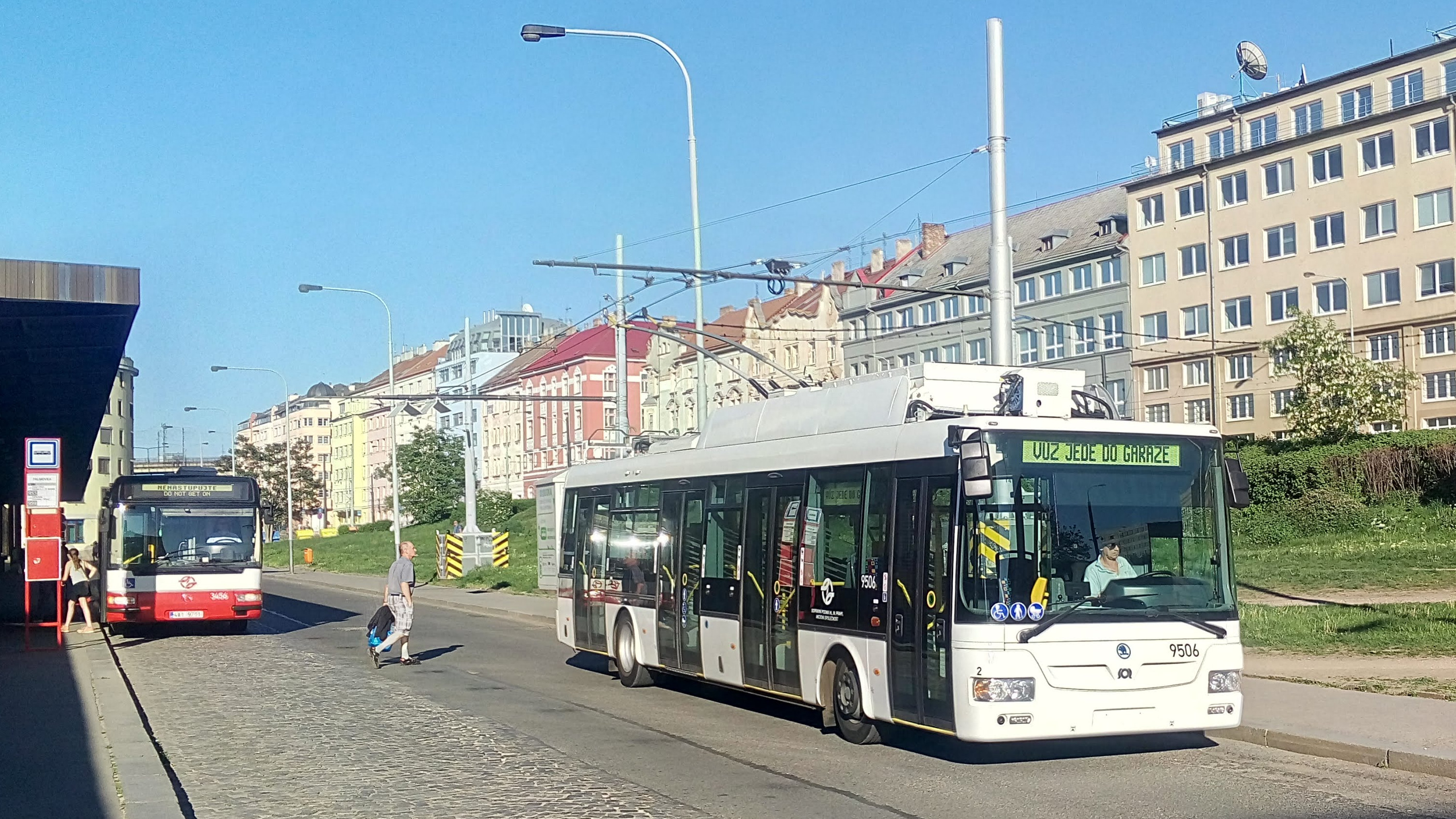
In-Motion Charging batteries charging at Palmovka, Prague

IMC trolleybuses are equipped with a high-capacity traction battery adapted to the route's specific requirements. The vehicle typically operates with a mix of wire connection and battery power (e.g., 60% of the time on the wire and 40% on battery).

- Charging: Charging occurs while the vehicle is in motion under existing overhead wires. Current transfer can reach power levels of up to 500 kW (e.g., the IMC500 system).
- Range: Modern units can travel significant distances off-wire, often in excess of 15 kilometres (9.3 mi).
- Advantages: Unlike stationary charging electric buses (Opportunity Charging or Overnight Charging), IMC does not require long charging stops at terminals or the construction of dedicated charging stations in public spaces. It allows for the electrification of bus routes by extending existing trolleybus lines.

=== Comparison with other electric buses ===
Feature	Overnight Charging (ONC)	Opportunity Charging (OC)	In-Motion Charging (IMC)
Charging Method	Slow charging at the depot (overnight)	Ultra-fast charging at specific stops	Charging in motion if under overhead wires
Infrastructure	Requires high-power grid connections at depots	Requires charging stations at stops/terminals	Uses existing trolleybus network; no new chargers needed for extensions
Downtime	4–10 hours (in depot)	5–25 minutes (at stops)	None (charges while driving)
Battery Size	Large/Heavy (reduces passenger capacity)	Moderate	Moderate/Small
Heating	Often requires diesel heater in winter	Electrical (limited)	Electrical (powered by overhead wire)
Grid Impact	High peak load at night	High spikes during fast charging	Distributed load throughout the day

Some operational issues have been noted in systems such as Saint Petersburg and Barnaul, where overheating of the contact wire can occur due to high charging currents if the vehicle is moving too slowly or is stationary while charging.

=== Automatic wiring and dewiring ===
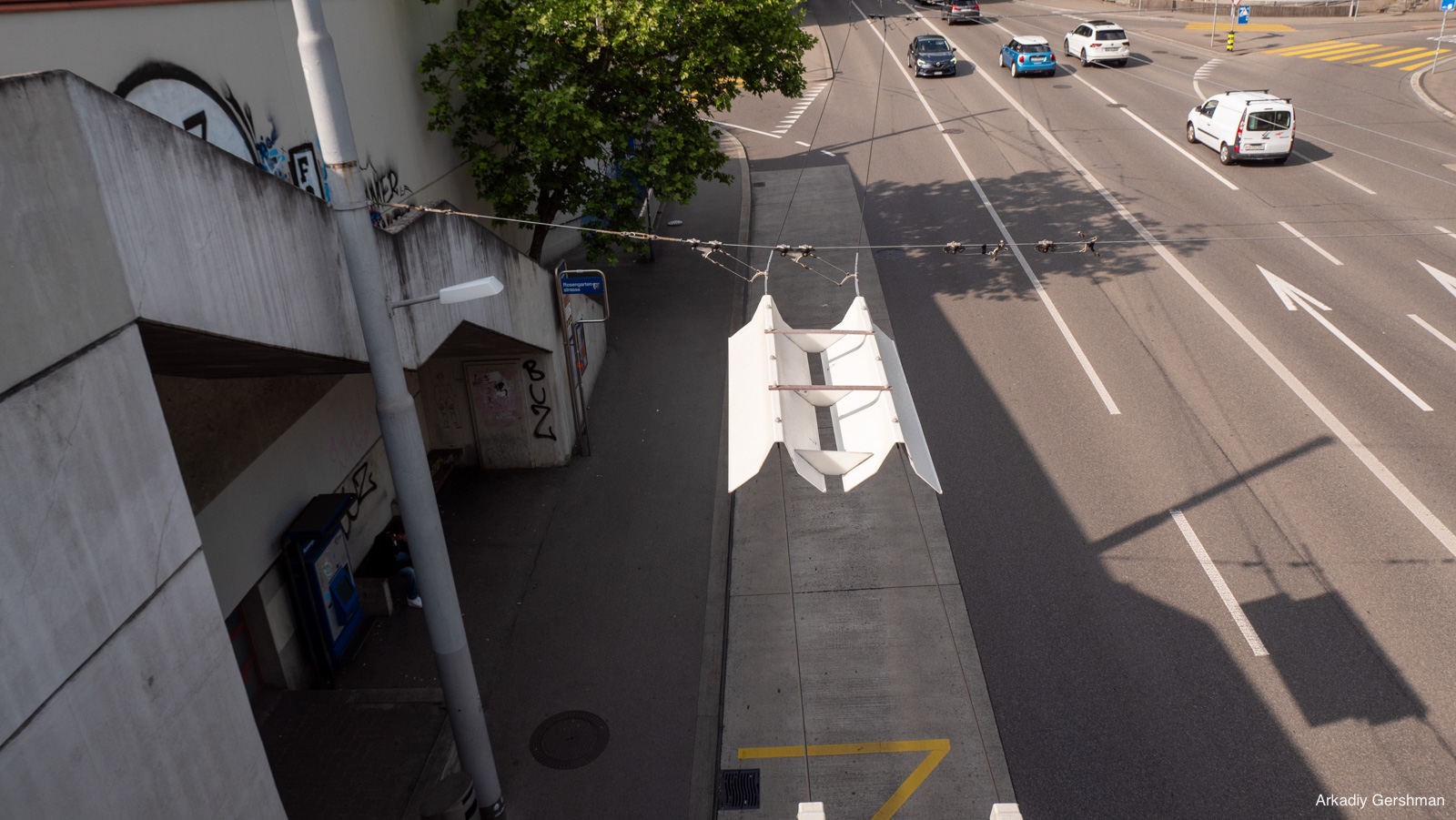
Catch pans in Zurich

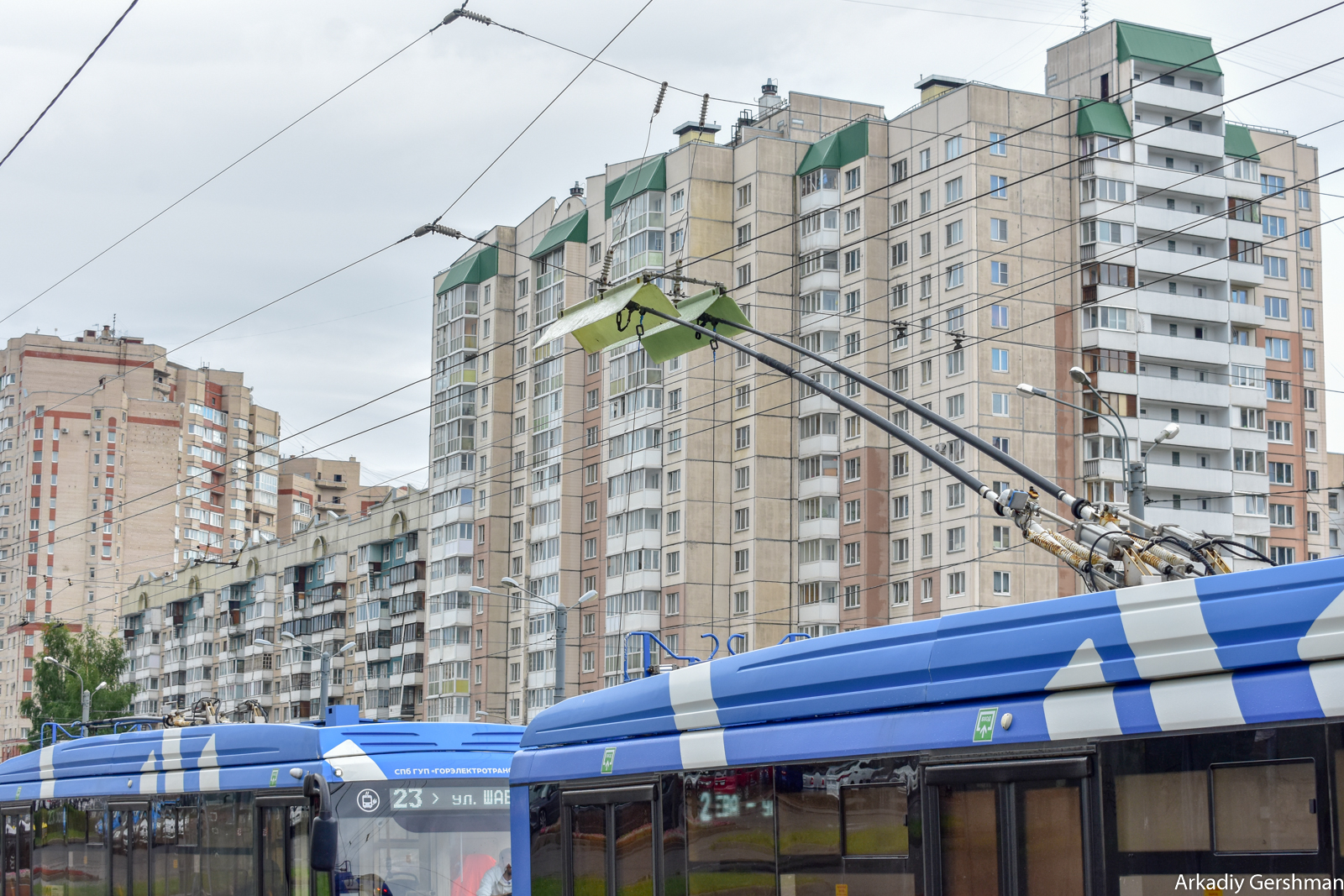
The first IMC has already connected to the wire network, while the second is waiting until the "wiredrops" are free. Saint Petersburg.

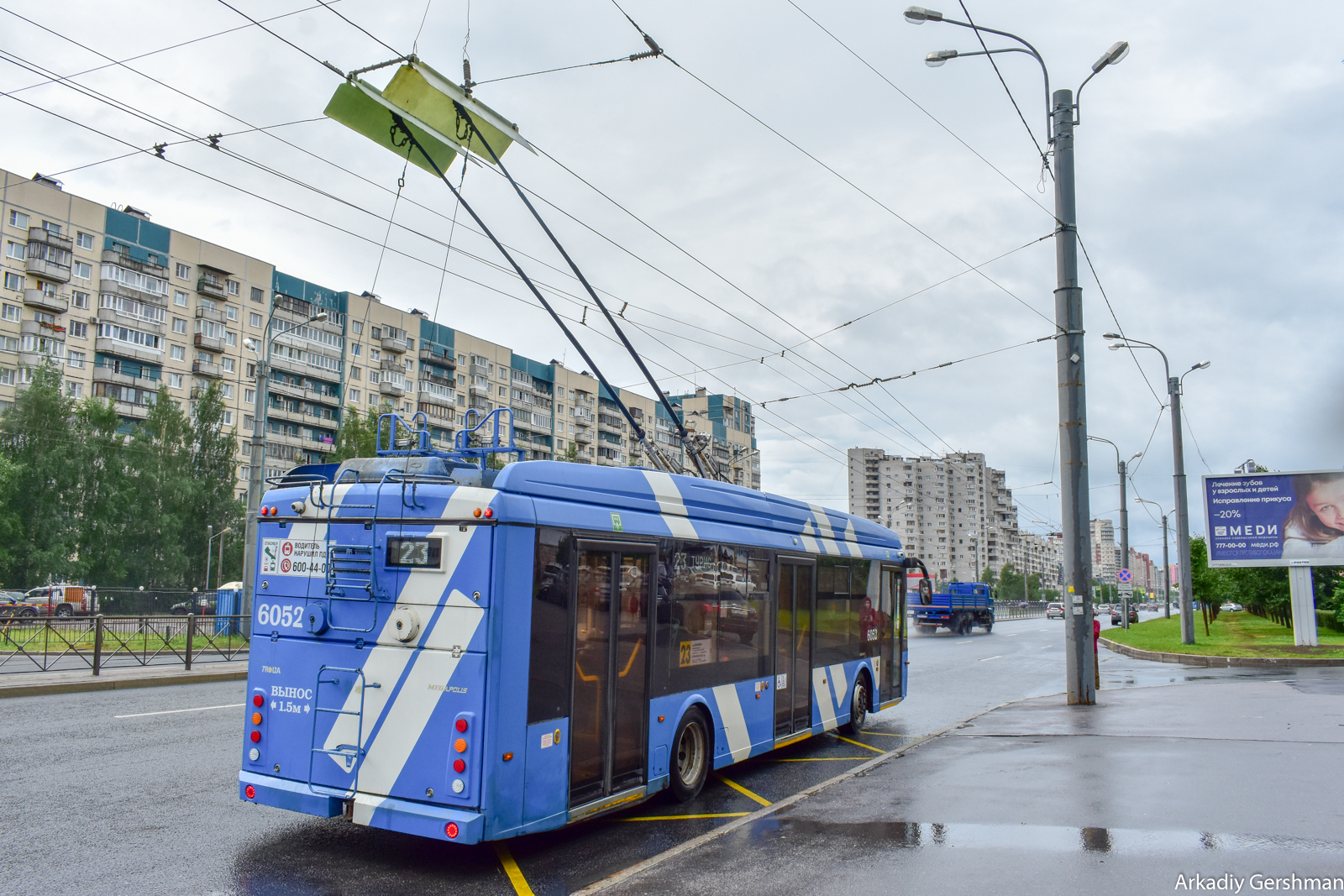
No manual driver intervention is required: the bars automatically position themselves in the right place. Saint Petersburg.

A key feature of modern IMC systems is the ability to switch between overhead wire mode and battery mode without the driver leaving the cab. While older systems required manual manipulation of the trolley poles (using ropes), modern vehicles utilize automatic current collectors.

- Dewiring: The driver can retract the trolley poles at any point, usually while the vehicle is in motion. Pneumatic or hydraulic systems pull the poles down to a locked position on the roof.
- Wiring: To reconnect to the grid, the vehicle typically stops or slows down at a specific location equipped with guiding funnels (also known as "catch pans", "wiredrops", or Einfädeltrichter in German). The driver activates the system, and the poles automatically rise; the funnels guide the collector shoes onto the contact wires.

Examples of this infrastructure in operation include:

- Solingen: Automatic wiring takes place at specific stops such as Burg Seilbahn and the Aufderhöhe bus station, where charging funnels were installed to support the extension of the network without continuous wiring.
- Zürich: Vehicles on routes like line 83 use threading funnels to reconnect to the network after running on battery power through complex intersections like Albisriederplatz.
- Naples: The system utilizes devices known locally as tegolini (little tiles) to guide the poles onto the bifilar wires after the automatic lifting mechanism is engaged.
- Other cities where such devices are used include Saint Petersburg, Prague and others.

== Implementation strategies and operational models ==
There are two fundamentally different approaches to the implementation of IMC, depending on whether the city has a trolleybus overhead contact network.

=== Existing overhead wire networks ===
==== Route extension ====
This is the most common entry point for IMC technology. Transit operators utilize existing overhead wire networks to charge the vehicle, then lower the poles to extend service into new neighborhoods, suburbs, or developments where installing wires is difficult or too expensive. This model allows for the organic growth of the network using existing infrastructure.

- Arnhem: As part of the "Trolley 2.0" initiative, the Dutch city utilized IMC to extend its reach regionally without building new infrastructure outside the urban core. On Line 352 connecting Arnhem to Wageningen, buses run under overhead wires for the first section to charge their batteries, then disconnect to cover the remaining intercity distance to the Wageningen bus station on battery power.
- Bobruisk: In 2023, Route 4 was launched using IMC technology to serve a new micro-district. The buses charge while driving under the old city network and switch to battery power to cover the non-electrified loop in the new residential area, saving significant infrastructure costs.
- Gdynia: The operator used IMC to extend line 31 to the Ergo Arena and line 29 to the Fikakowo district, areas previously unreachable by electric transit due to a lack of wiring.

==== Diesel replacement ====
In this model, operators identify diesel bus routes that overlap significantly with existing trolleybus wires. By switching these lines to IMC vehicles, the bus can run under the wires for the shared portion of the journey (charging the battery) and run autonomously for the unique, non-wired section of the route. This eliminates diesel emissions without requiring new infrastructure.

- Beijing: Between 2015 and 2016, several Bus Rapid Transit (BRT) lines were converted from diesel to dual-source trolleybuses. The vehicles charge while running in the dedicated BRT lanes and use batteries to navigate complex intersections or depot movements.
- Esslingen am Neckar: The city integrated bus lines 113 and 118 into the electric network. Buses use the existing catenary in the city center and switch to battery power to serve the districts of Berkheim and Zollberg.
- Minsk: The city has adopted a systematic policy of replacing diesel bus routes with IMC trolleybuses to utilize its extensive existing infrastructure. For example, in 2021, bus routes 56 and 90 were converted to trolleybus operation using vehicles with extended autonomous range, and in 2022, trolleybus route 22 was extended to replace bus routes 38 and 123.
- Zürich: The city's transit operator, VBZ, converted the busy diesel bus line 83 to electric operation in 2020 using battery-trolleybuses. The vehicles run under overhead wires for charging between Milchbuck and Hardplatz, then operate entirely on battery power to reach the Altstetten railway station, eliminating the need for fossil fuel buses on this corridor.

=== Re-electrification and new systems ===
Some cities that previously abandoned trolleybuses are returning to the technology via IMC, as it requires less visual clutter (fewer wires) and lower capital investment than traditional systems.

- Prague: After dismantling its original network in 1972, Prague began re-electrifying in 2017 using IMC model. Overhead wires are installed on main roads and on steep hills (where energy consumption is highest) and at charging hubs, while the rest of the route is driven on battery power. This strategy was used to electrify the bus line to the airport (Line 59) using high-capacity, bi-articulated IMC buses.
- Trambus (Şanliurfa): Opened in April 2023, this is one of the newest trolleybus systems in the world. The 7.7 km line (Line 63) operates in the city center. Tests were conducted publicly without catenary connection to demonstrate the battery capabilities before the official launch. It joins other modern "Trambus" systems in Turkey that utilize high-capacity electric buses with overhead charging infrastructure.

==== Bus Rapid Transit (BRT) ====
IMC is increasingly used for high-capacity, high-frequency corridors. The combination of overhead wires (for guaranteed power during acceleration and hill climbing) and batteries (for flexibility) makes IMC a strong competitor to light rail. BRT systems utilize trolleybus technology to lower air pollution and noise emissions compared to diesel equivalents; while installing overhead lines incurs a capital cost, it can be offset by lower energy costs and environmental benefits.

- Marrakesh, Morocco: In 2017, Marrakesh opened a BRT system utilizing trolleybuses. The 8 km (5.0 mi) corridor features only 3 km (1.9 mi) of overhead wiring, requiring the vehicles to operate on battery power (IMC) for the majority of the route.
- Quito, Ecuador: The MetrobusQ system, opened in 1995, was an early adopter of electric BRT using articulated trolleybuses to navigate the city's high-altitude terrain.
- Mexico City: The city has engaged in a massive renewal of its fleet with Yutong IMC buses. A standout project is Line 11, a high-capacity BRT corridor connecting Santa Marta to Chalco. Opened in 2025, it utilizes a fleet of 108 articulated trolleybuses running on a dedicated route that includes a 7.2 km elevated viaduct to connect the capital with the neighboring State of Mexico.
- Pescara: The "Filovia di Pescara" (Line V1) connects Pescara with Montesilvano using a dedicated right-of-way (BRT) for much of the route. The system was designed specifically for IMC operation: approximately 75% of the 8.15 km route is equipped with overhead wires for charging, while the terminals at both ends (Pescara terminal and Montesilvano convention center) are wire-free, traversed using battery power. The system uses Van Hool ExquiCity vehicles.

== Global adoption ==
=== Asia ===
- China: China has been a leader in adopting battery trolleybuses. Beijing and Shanghai operate extensive fleets. In Beijing, BRT lines were converted from diesel to dual-source trolleybuses between 2015 and 2016. The city of Baoding launched a system exclusively based on battery trolleybuses.

=== Africa ===
- Morocco: Marrakesh operates high-capacity trolleybuses on its BRT system. The infrastructure was designed with partial electrification, relying on In-Motion Charging to cover significant portions of the route without catenary.

=== Europe ===
==== Germany ====
- Solingen: The municipal utility (SWS) tested four "Battery-Overhead-Buses" (BOB) from Solaris and Kiepe Electric beginning in June 2018. These vehicles were capable of charging under overhead wires and operating on battery power for non-electrified sections, allowing for the conversion of diesel lines to electric operation. The maiden voyage with passengers took place on 16 June 2018. These buses were deployed on Line 695, a 14.3 kilometres (8.9 mi) route where only 2.8 kilometres (1.7 mi) is wired. Electric operation on Line 695 officially launched on 31 October 2019. Following this success, SWS ordered additional vehicles, and by early 2024, new Solaris Trollino 12 buses were introduced on lines 691 and 694 (previously diesel-operated) and lines 685 and 686. To support this, charging funnels were installed at the Aufderhöhe bus station for intermediate stationary charging.
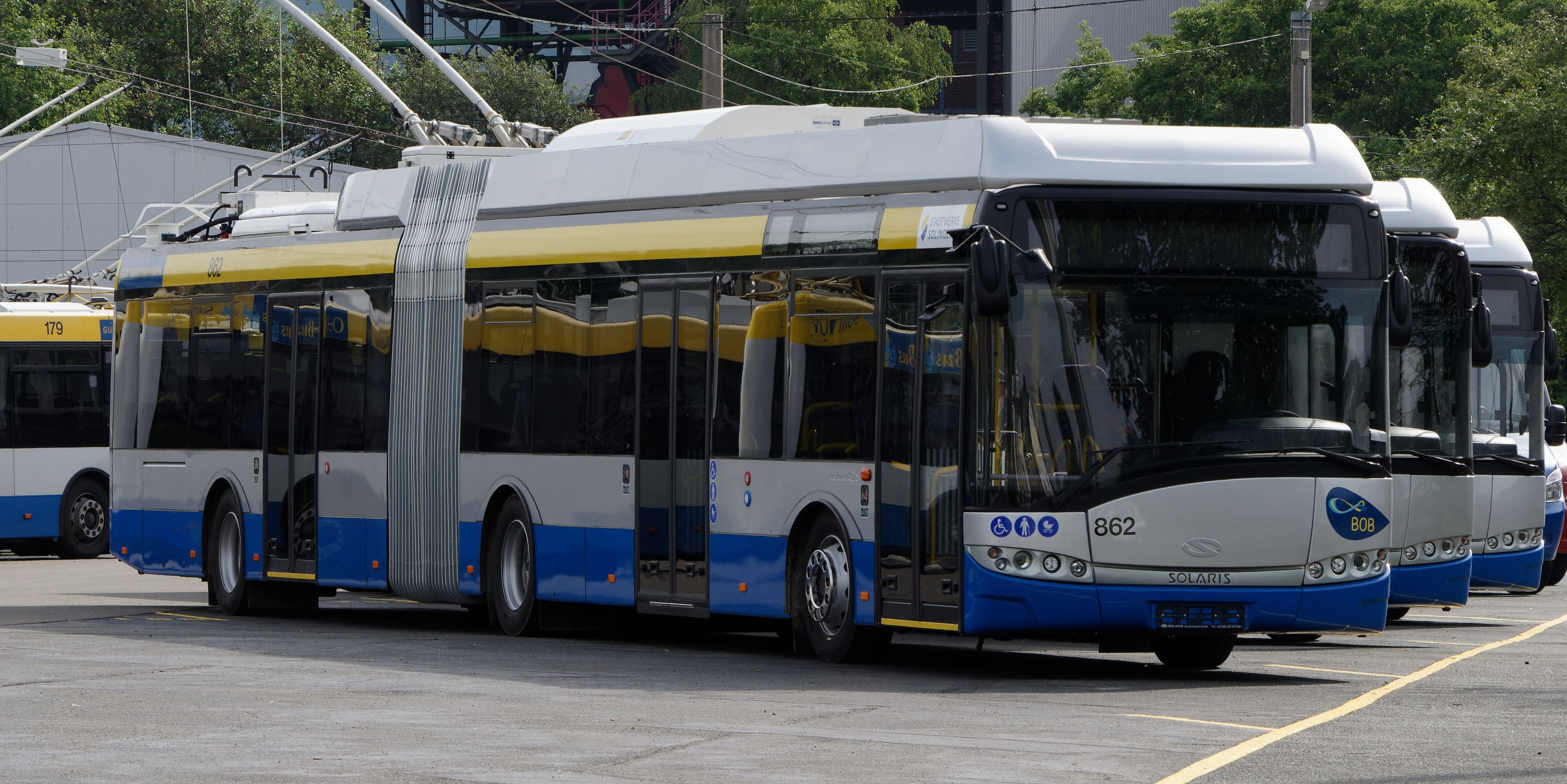
The "BOB" bus at the Solingen municipal utility grounds during its maiden voyage (2018)

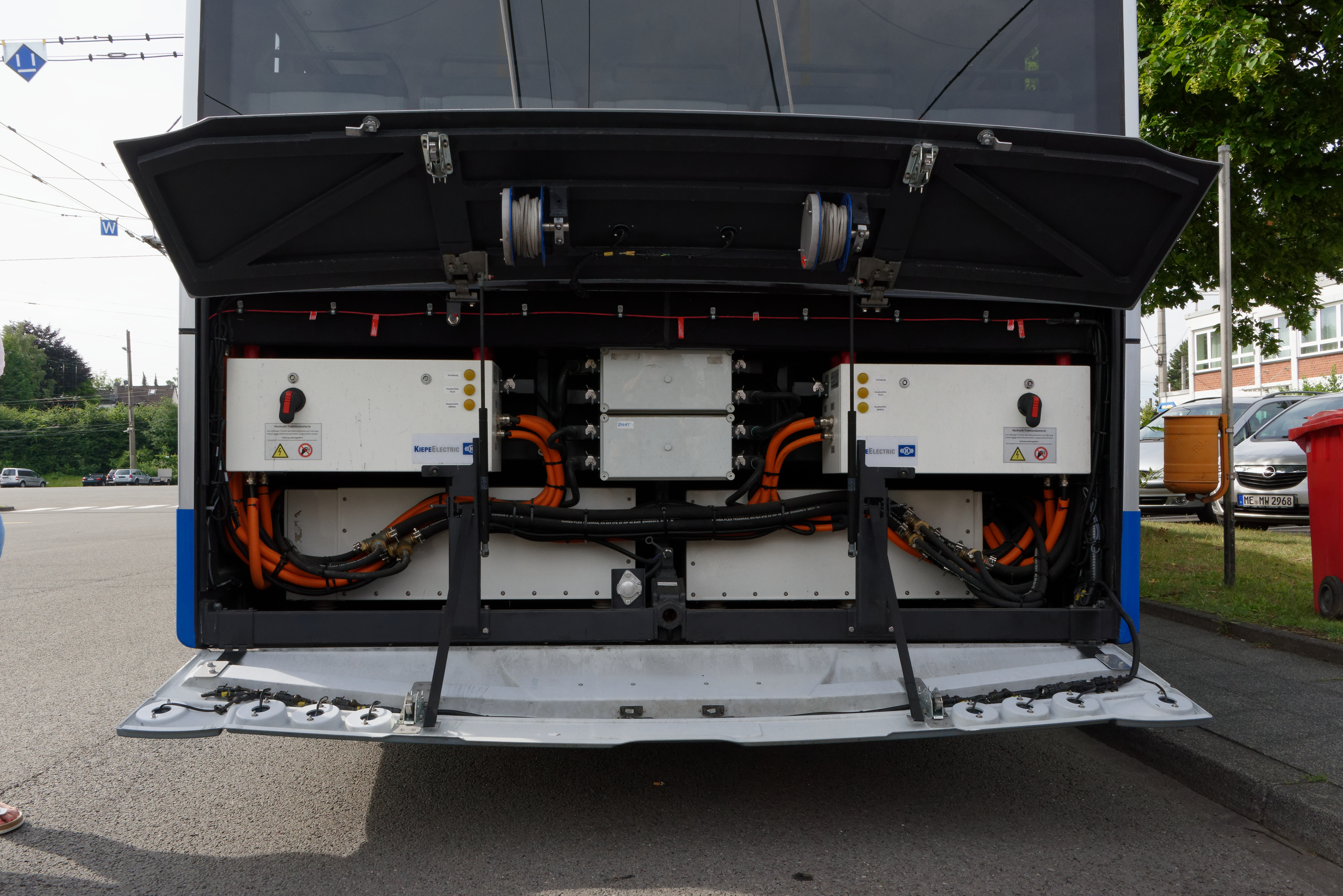
Control units and battery

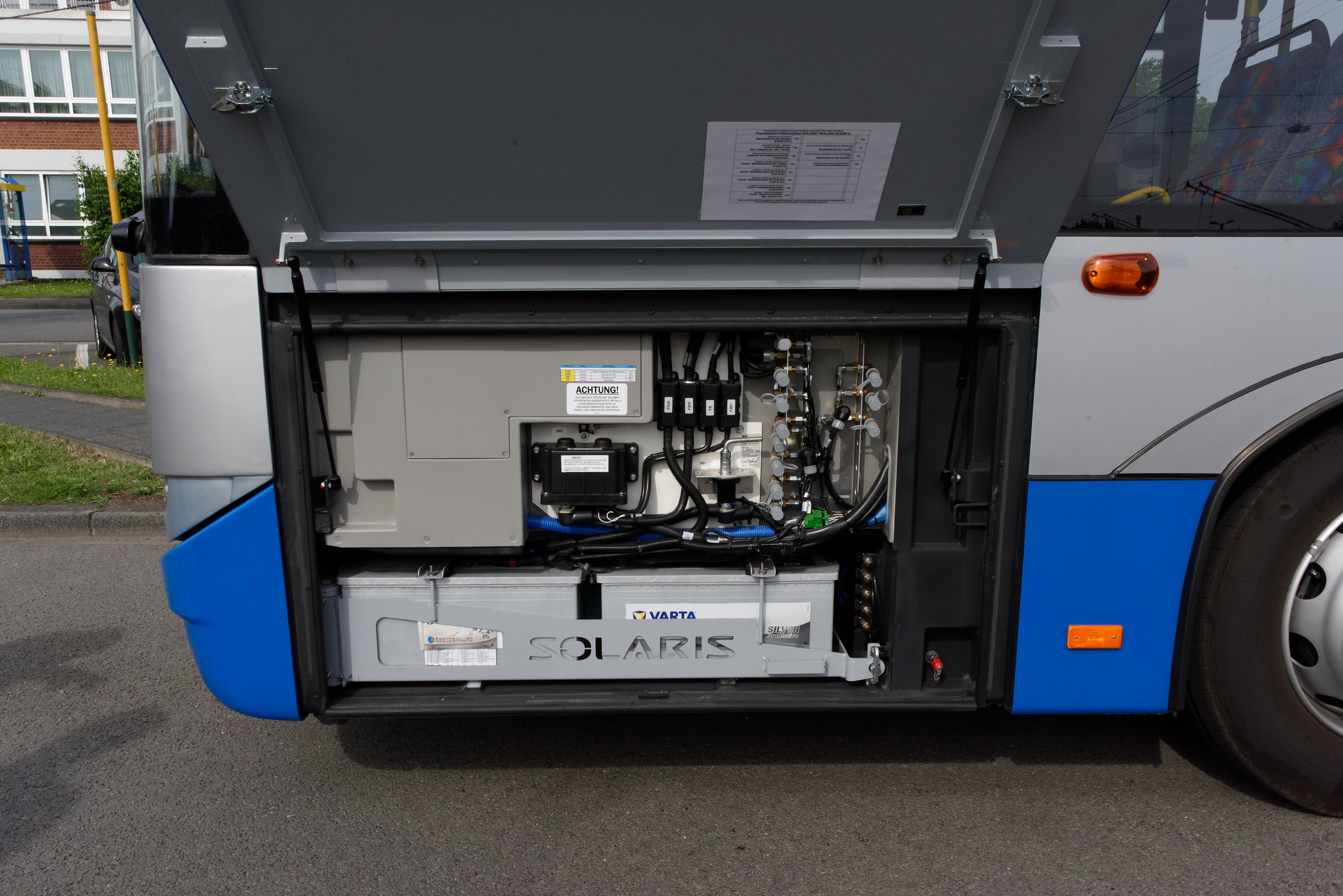
Central control unit for switching on/off

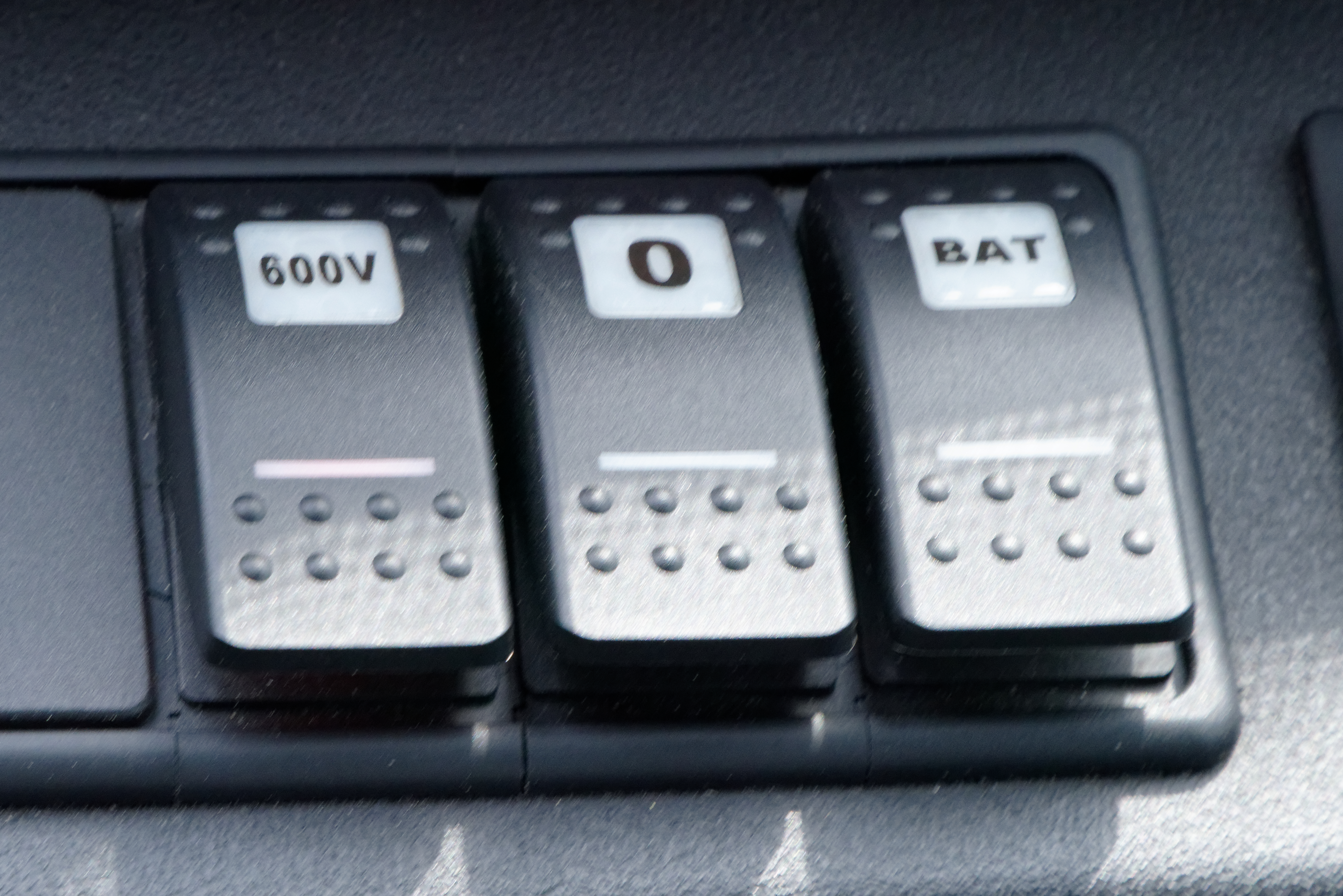
Operation mode selection (600 V = Overhead wire)

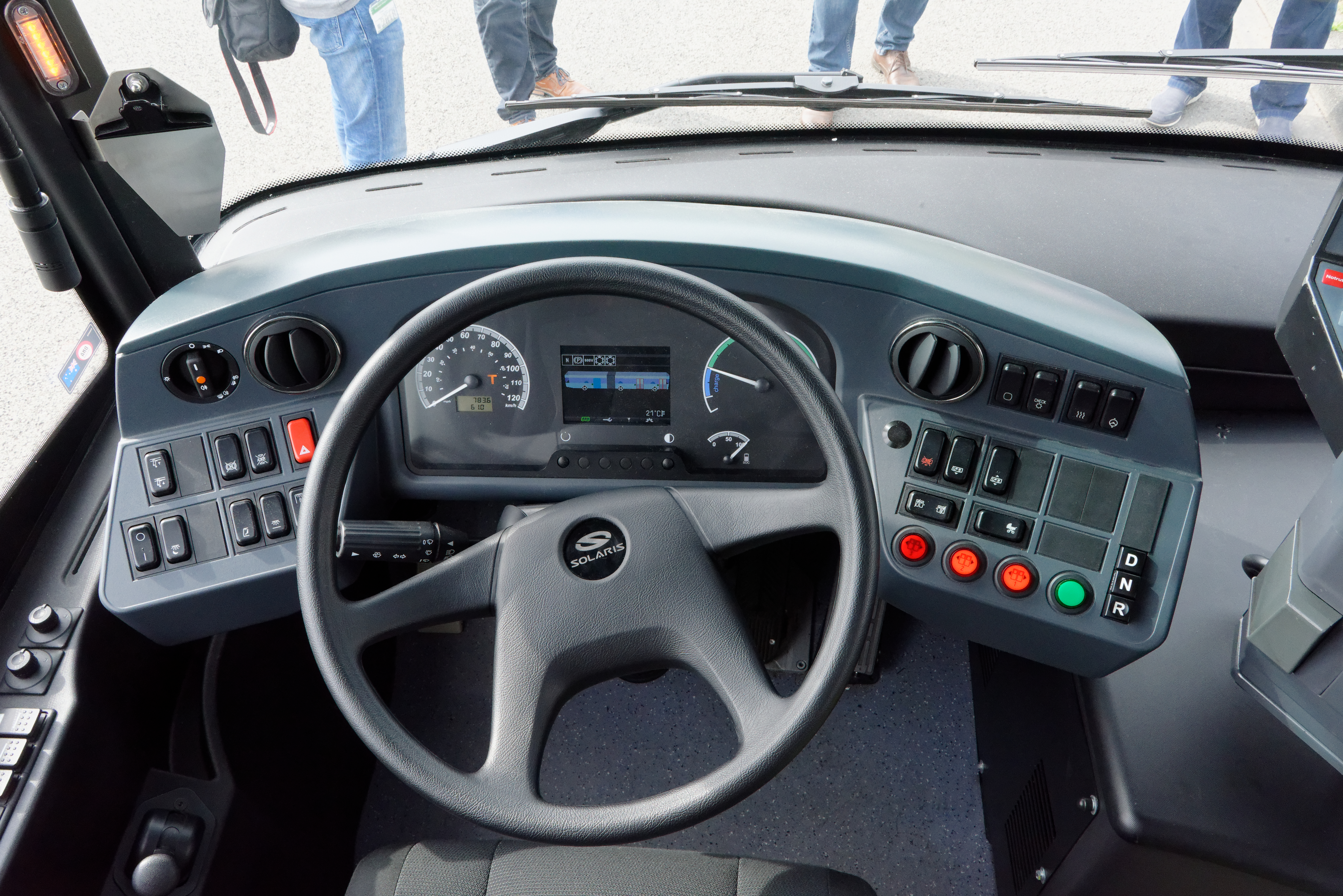
Driver's cockpit

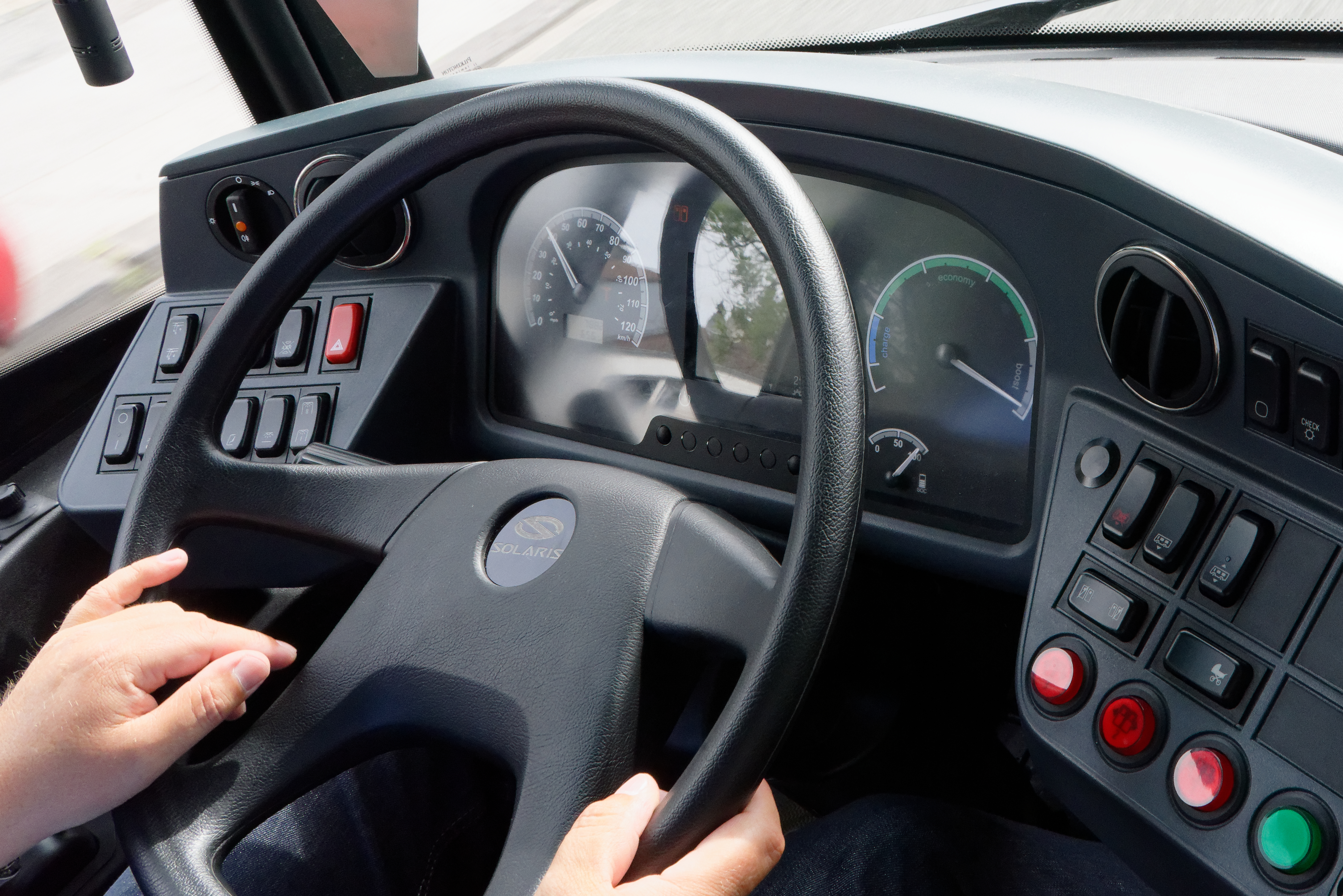
Power consumption display under full load

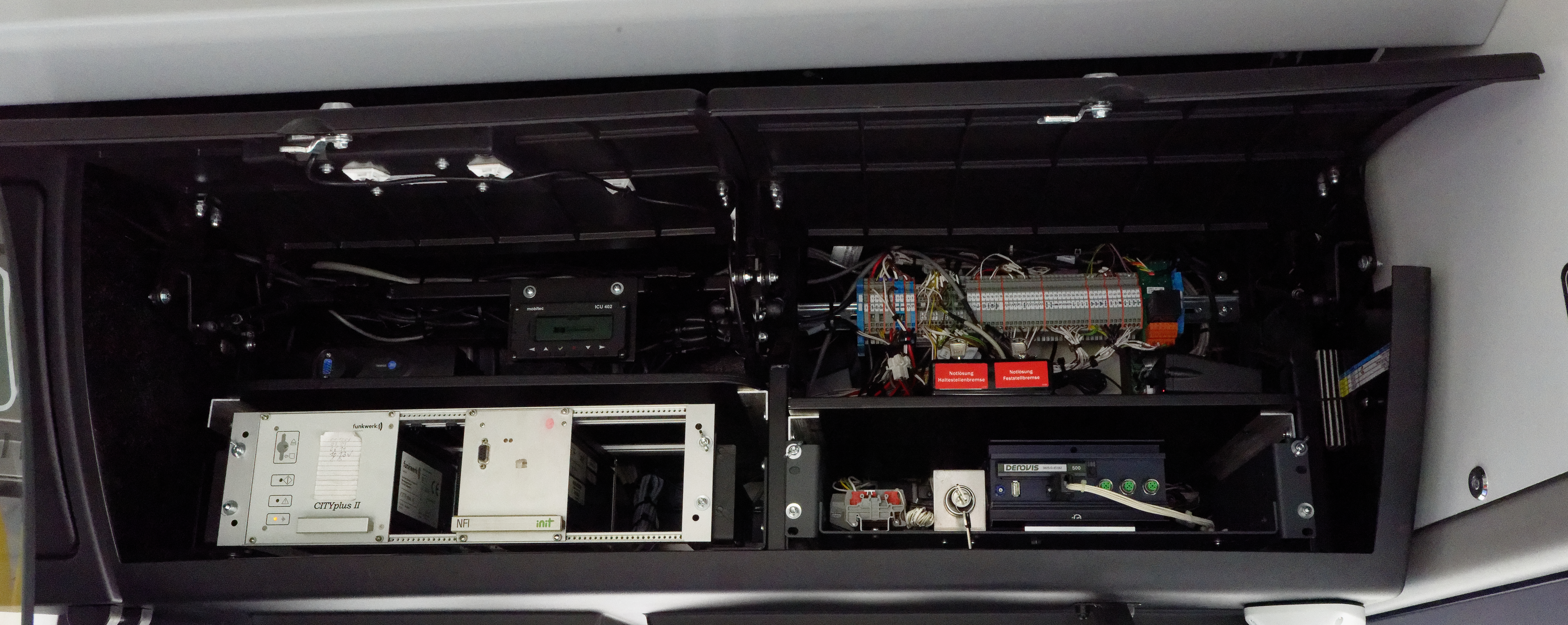
Central unit for video storage (above the driver)
- Esslingen am Neckar: With a fleet renewal in late 2015, Esslingen integrated bus line 113 into the trolleybus network in May 2016 without building new overhead lines. The line operates in combined wire and battery mode; buses switch to battery power to serve the Berkheim district, utilizing reactivated infrastructure from former duo-bus lines for rewiring. Similarly, line 118 was converted to IMC operation, allowing buses to serve sections that are only wired in one direction by running on batteries for the return leg. The city plans to expand the network to 100% electric mobility by 2040, with further expansions planned for the Pliensauvorstadt and Zollberg districts.

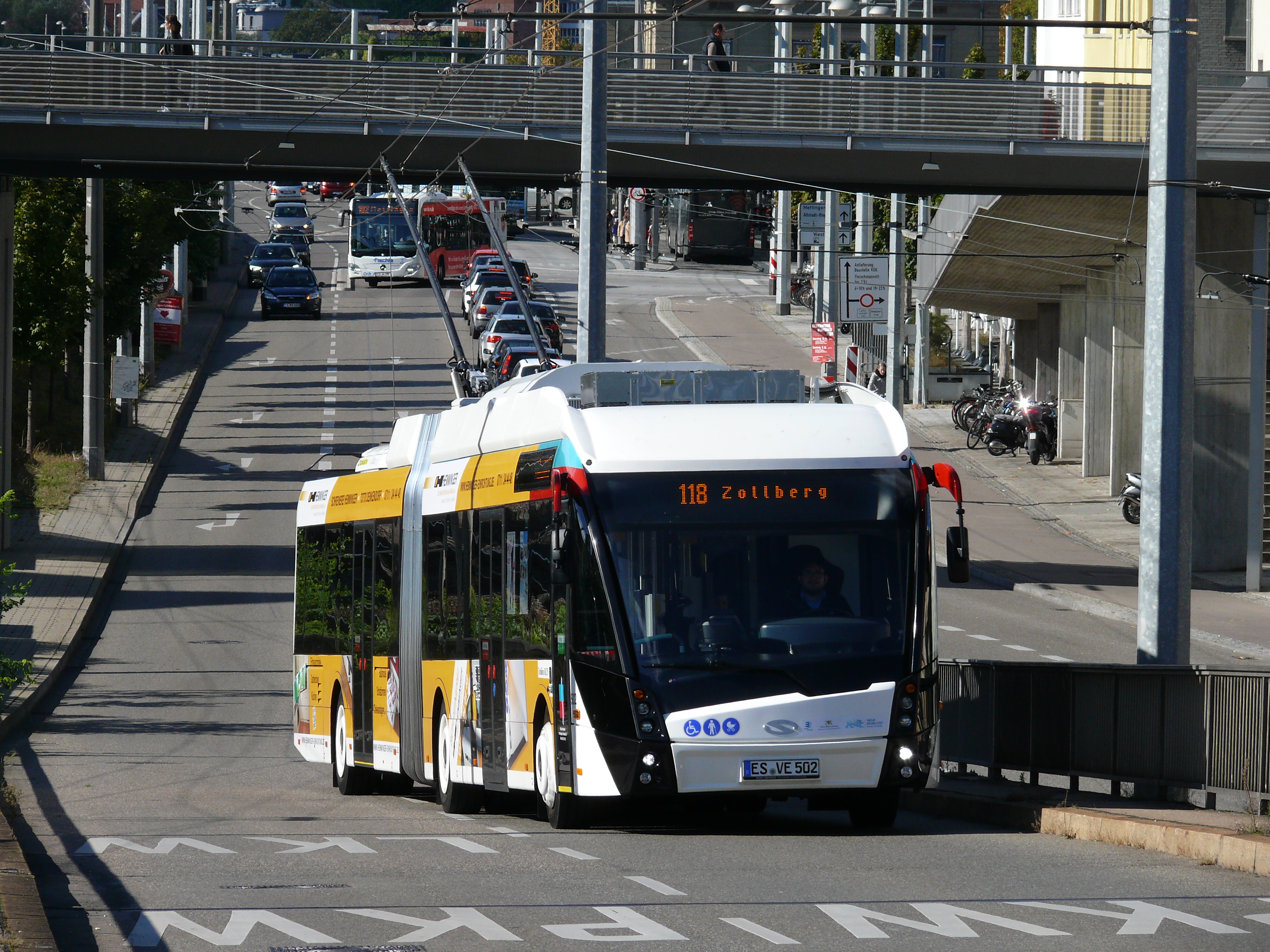
Solaris Trollino with IMC in Esslingen am Neckar, Germany

- Eberswalde also utilizes IMC technology.
- Other cities: In 2020, Berlin announced plans for a new trolleybus system with 190 battery trolleybuses, though plans were shifted toward battery-only buses in early 2023.

==== Switzerland ====
Zürich, Geneva, and Lucerne operate extensive networks. For example, the "Swiss Trolley Plus" by Carrosserie Hess was tested in Zürich.

==== Czech Republic ====
Cities like Prague, Plzeň and Ostrava have integrated battery trolleybuses to extend routes into areas without wires. In Prague, the electrification of bus line 119 to the airport (rebranded as trolleybus line 59) utilizing 24-meter IMC vehicles is a prominent project.

==== Italy ====
- Lecce opened a dual-mode system in 2012.
- Rimini operates the Metromare BRT system using IMC technology.
- Milan is progressively updating its fleet with IMC vehicles (e.g., Solaris Trollino) to cover route sections without overhead wires or during diversions.
- Pescara launched its "La Verde" (V1) line using Van Hool Exqui.City IMC trolleybuses.

=== North and South America ===
- US & Canada: San Francisco (Muni), Seattle (King County Metro), and Dayton operate large fleets of trolleybuses with battery off-wire capability (replacing older dual-mode diesel units). Vancouver also utilizes these systems.
- Argentina: Cities like Rosario and Córdoba have imported Trolza vehicles with autonomous capabilities to extend range beyond the wires.
- Mexico: Mexico City has aggressively expanded its trolleybus network, including the elevated Line 10, using Yutong battery trolleybuses.

=== Russia and Belarus ===
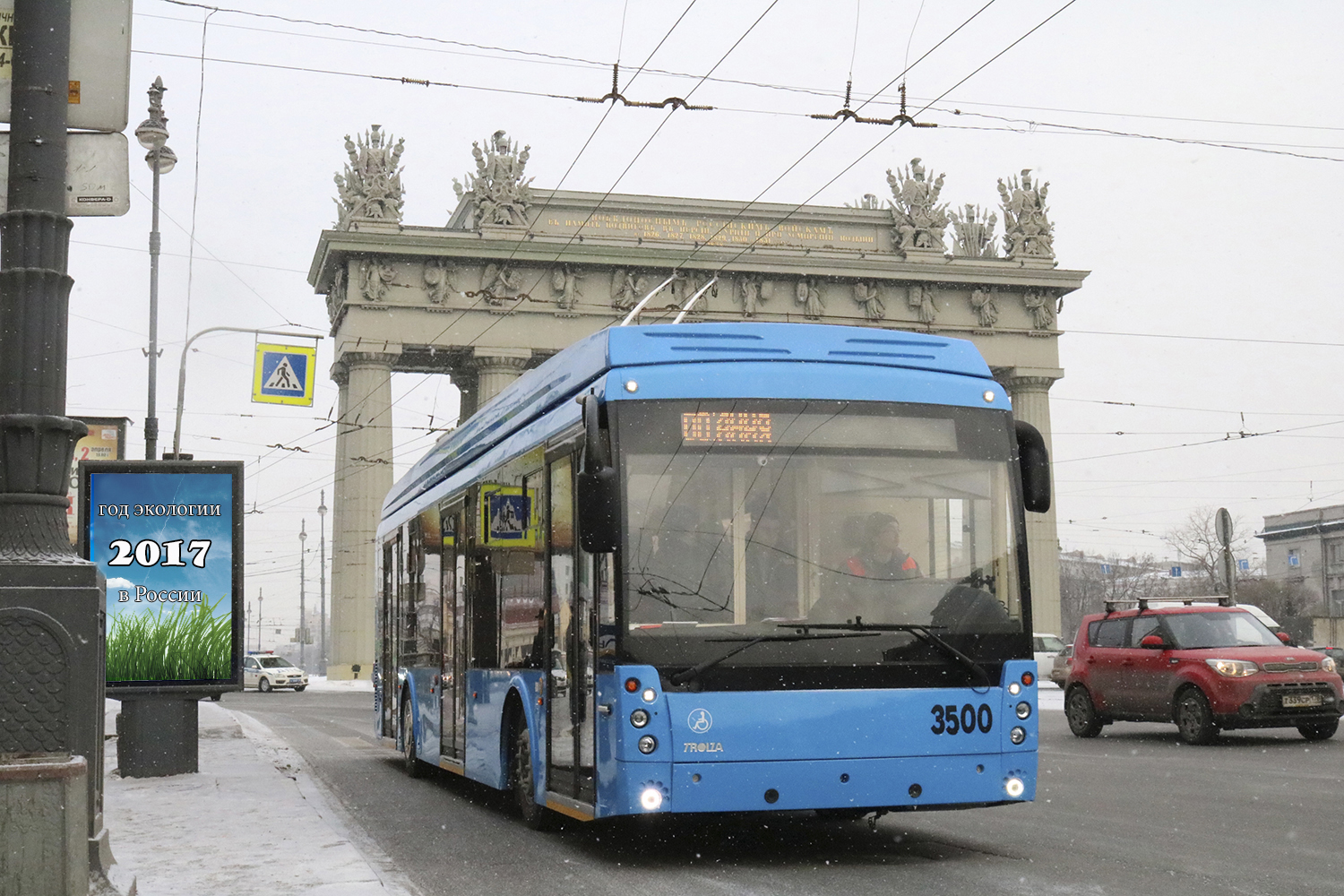
Trolza-5265 with IMC in Saint Petersburg.

The region has seen rapid development of "Trolleybuses with Extended Autonomous Run" (TUAH).

- Saint Petersburg: Launched a major initiative in 2017 to expand the network without installing new overhead lines. By late 2023, over 13 routes and 200 vehicles were operating, linking metro stations to new housing developments.
- Other Cities: Novosibirsk, Krasnodar, Cheboksary, and Khabarovsk have actively purchased and deployed IMC vehicles to extend routes to suburbs.

==== Belarus ====
- Manufacturers BKM Holding and MAZ produce IMC buses used domestically (Minsk, Gomel, Vitebsk, Grodno) and exported abroad. Minsk has utilized IMC technology to return trolleybus service to the entire length of Independence Avenue. The city of Bobruisk relaunched its Route 4 in 2023 using MAZ-203T70 vehicles, serving as an example of successful IMC implementation in a smaller city to bridge gaps in infrastructure.

== Manufacturers ==
Major manufacturers of IMC buses and propulsion systems include:

- Kiepe Electric (Germany/USA) – Provides electrical systems for chassis manufacturers.
- Solaris Bus & Coach (Poland) – Produces the Trollino series, including the 24-meter double-articulated version.
- Carrosserie Hess (Switzerland) – Produces the lighTram series.
- Van Hool (Belgium) – Produces the Exqui.City series.
- BKM Holding (Belarus) – Produces the 32100D and Olgerd series.
- MAZ (Belarus) – Produces the MAZ-203T series.
- PC Transport Systems (Russia) – Produces the Admiral series.
- Yutong (China).
- Trolza (Russia) – Defunct, formerly a major supplier of the Megapolis series.

== See also ==
- Battery electric bus
- Dual-mode bus
- Electric bus
- Electric road
- Ground-level power supply
- Trolleybus
- Trolleytruck
