= Hybrid trolleybus =

Hybrid trolleybus may refer to:

- Dual-mode bus, a bus capable of operating both from conventional trolleybus overhead lines and from fossil fuel engine, allowing operation away from the wires
- In-motion charging electric bus, an electric bus that draws power from an overhead contact network (catenary) via trolley poles while simultaneously charging an on-board traction battery
- Trolleybus with APU, a trolleybus equipped with an auxiliary power source (battery, supercapacitor, or small generator) to allow limited emergency movement
