= Trolleybuses in Novosibirsk =

Trolleybus system in Novosibirsk, Russia

Novosibirsk trolleybus system
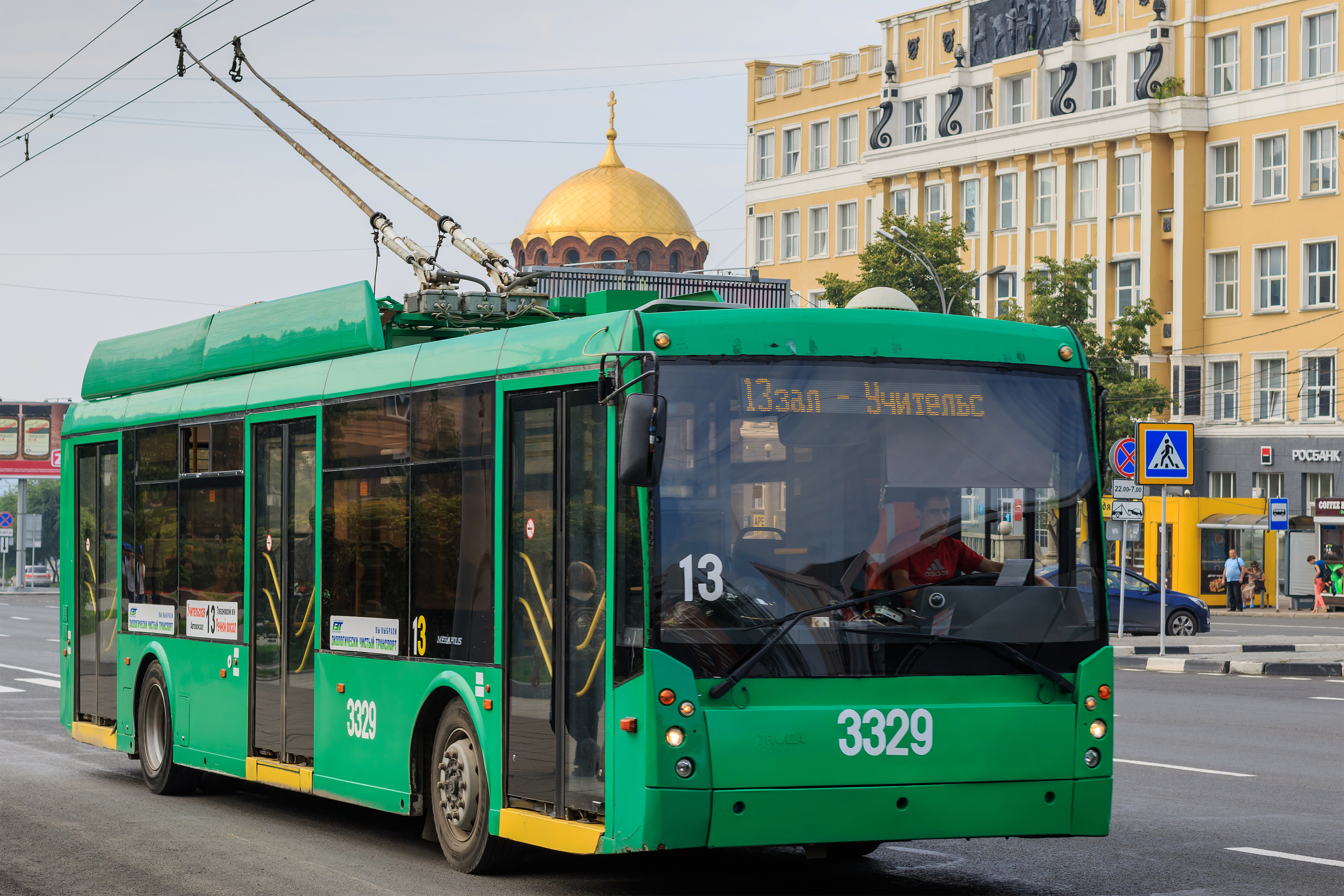

Operation
- Locale: Novosibirsk, Russia
- Open: 6 November 1957
- Routes: 14
- Operator: MKP «GET»

Infrastructure
- Depot: 4
- Stock: 299

Statistics
- Route length: 133,4

The Novosibirsk trolleybus system (Russian: Новосибирский троллейбус) is part of the public transport network of Novosibirsk, Russia. The system opened on 6 November 1957.

== History ==
A test drive took place on November 6, 1957. Regular passenger service began the next day.

In 1957, 10 trolleybuses operated in the city. By the end of 1957, 17 trolleybuses operated. By 1958, the number of trolleybuses increased to 45.

== Current status ==
The system consists of 14 routes (№ 2, 4, 5, 7, 8, 10, 13, 22, 23, 24, 26, 29, 35, and 36).

The trolleybus fleet is represented by such "classic'" trolleybuses as Soviet ZiU-9, and ZiU-10, Russian BTZ-5276-01, Trolza-5265.00, Trolza-5275.05, and Trolza-5275.06, Belarusian AKSM-101A, and AKSM-101M. In 2011-2012, trolleybuses ST-6217M with battery packs, manufactured by Novosibirsk factory Liotech, were tested. Experiment had ended when Liotech was declared insolvent. In 2022, municipal authorities decided to repeat the experiment with new trolleybuses with battery packs - UTTZ-6241.01.

== Gallery ==
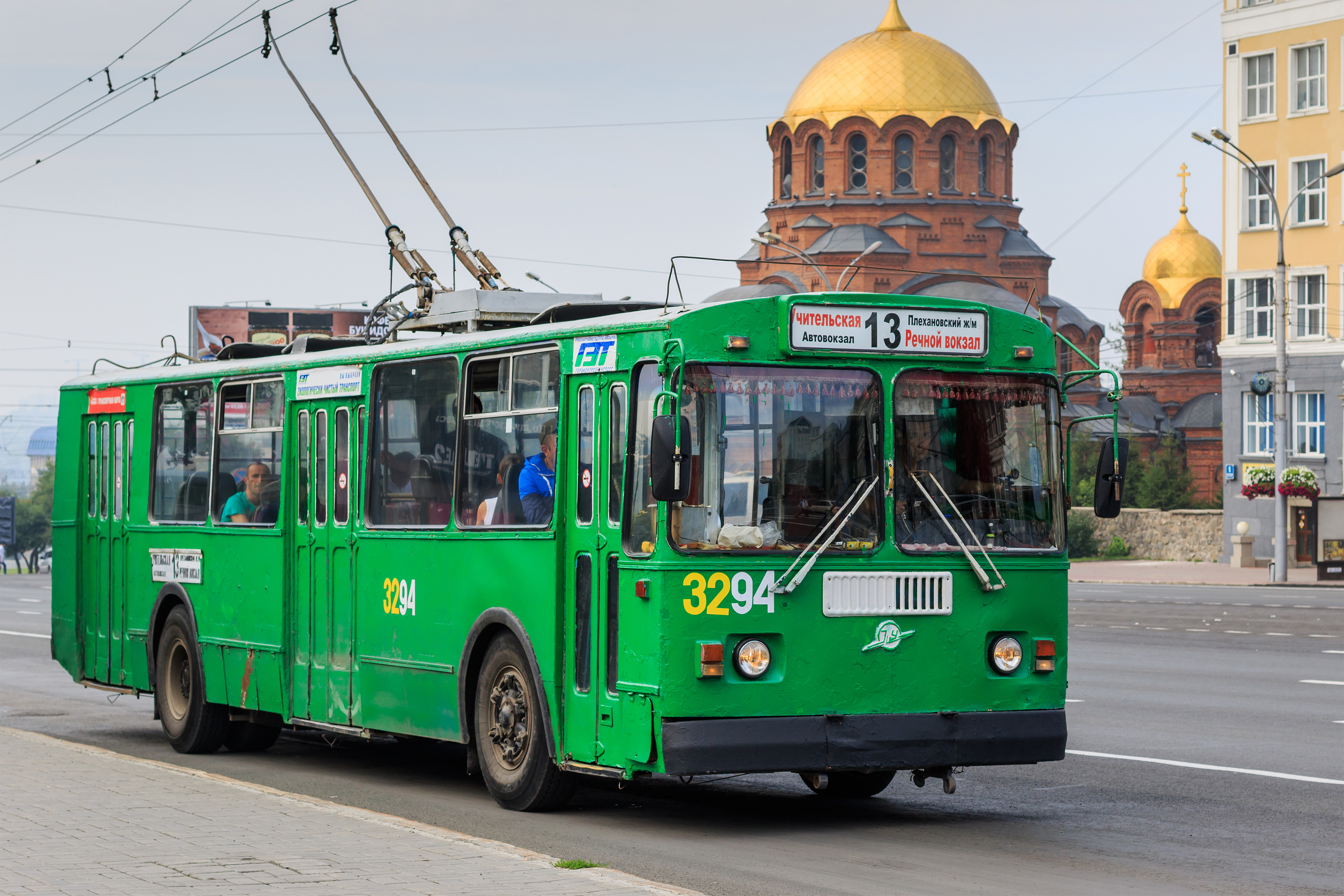

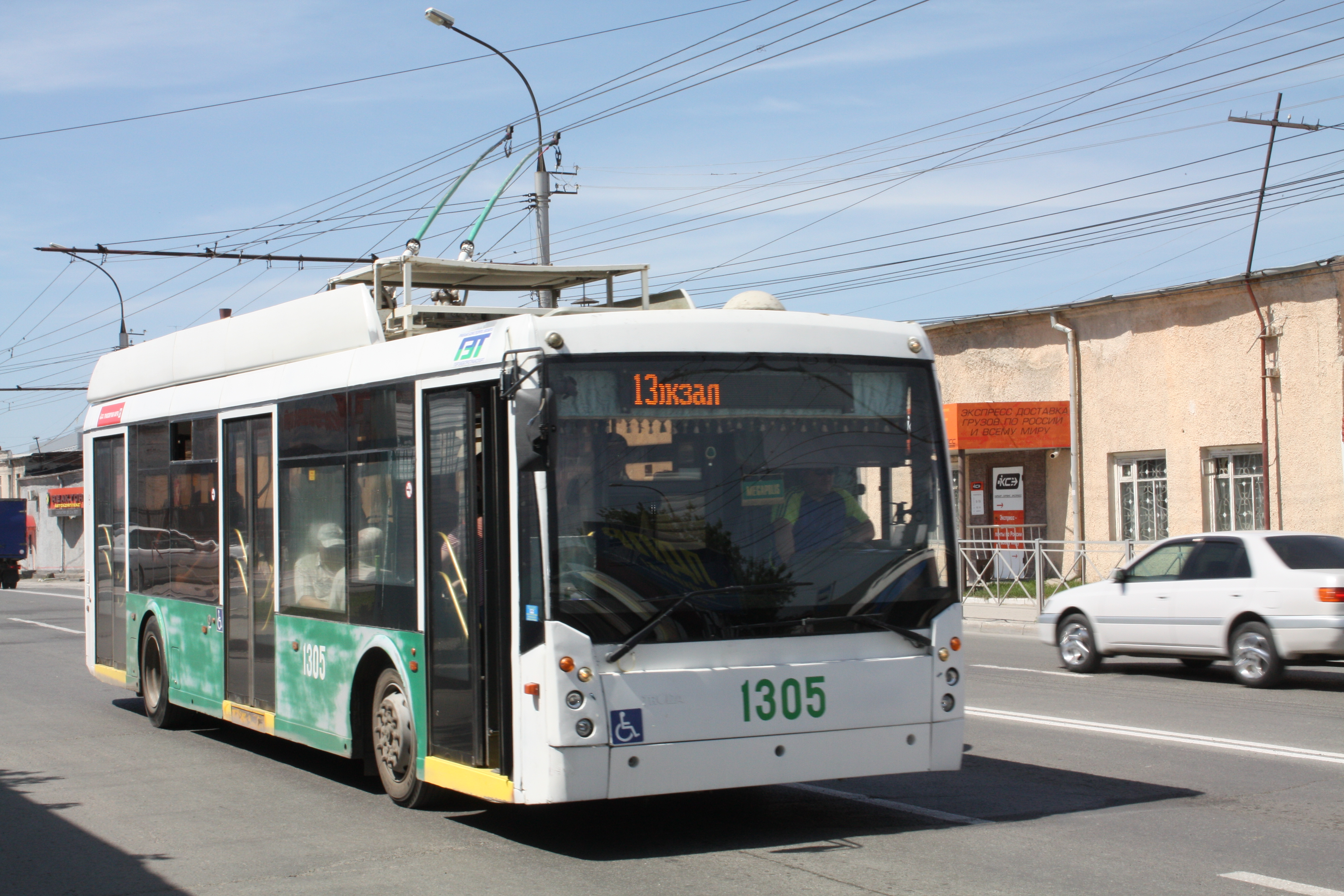

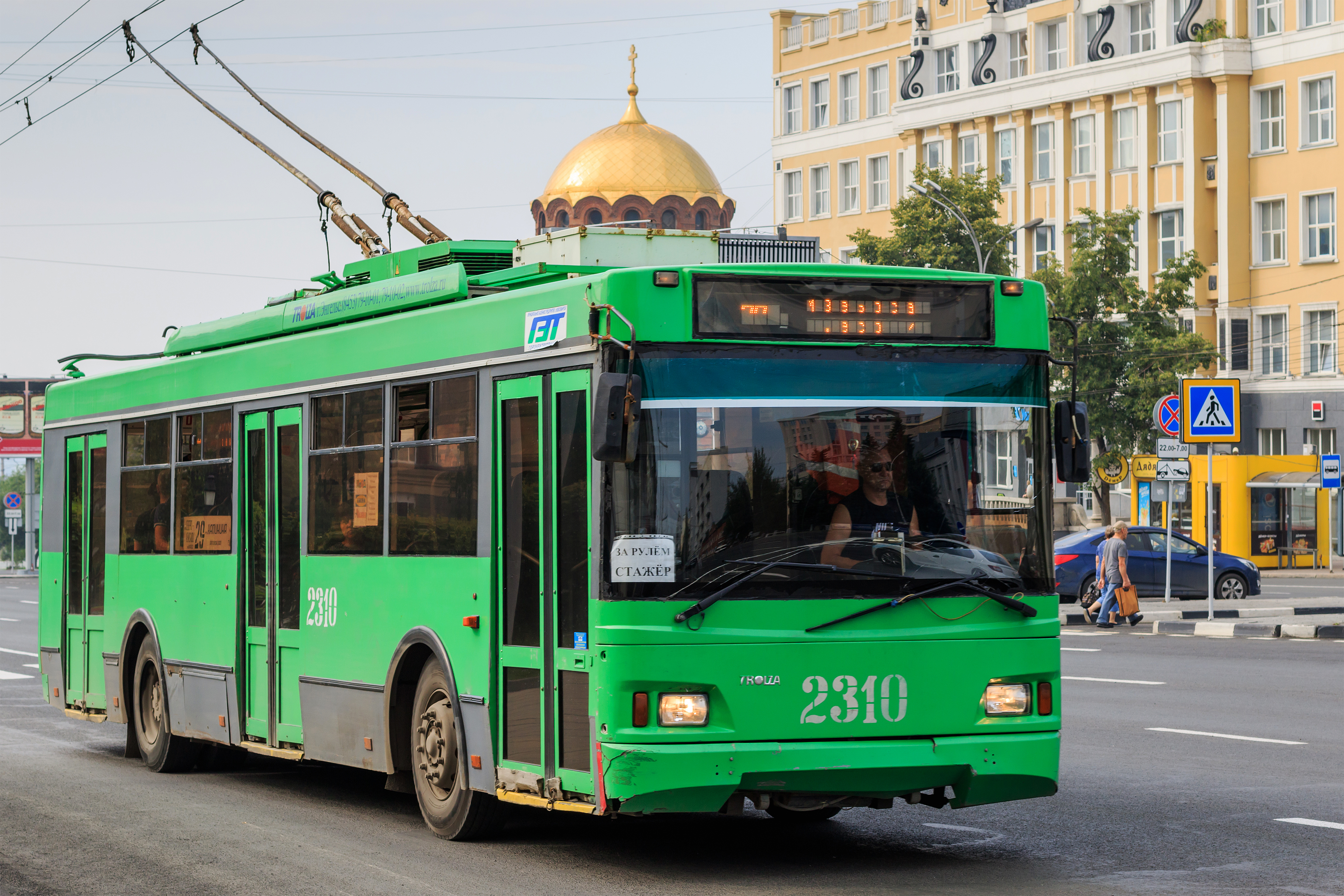
