= Saint Petersburg trolleybus system =

Trolleybus system in Russia

Saint Petersburg trolleybus
- Санкт-петербургский троллейбус

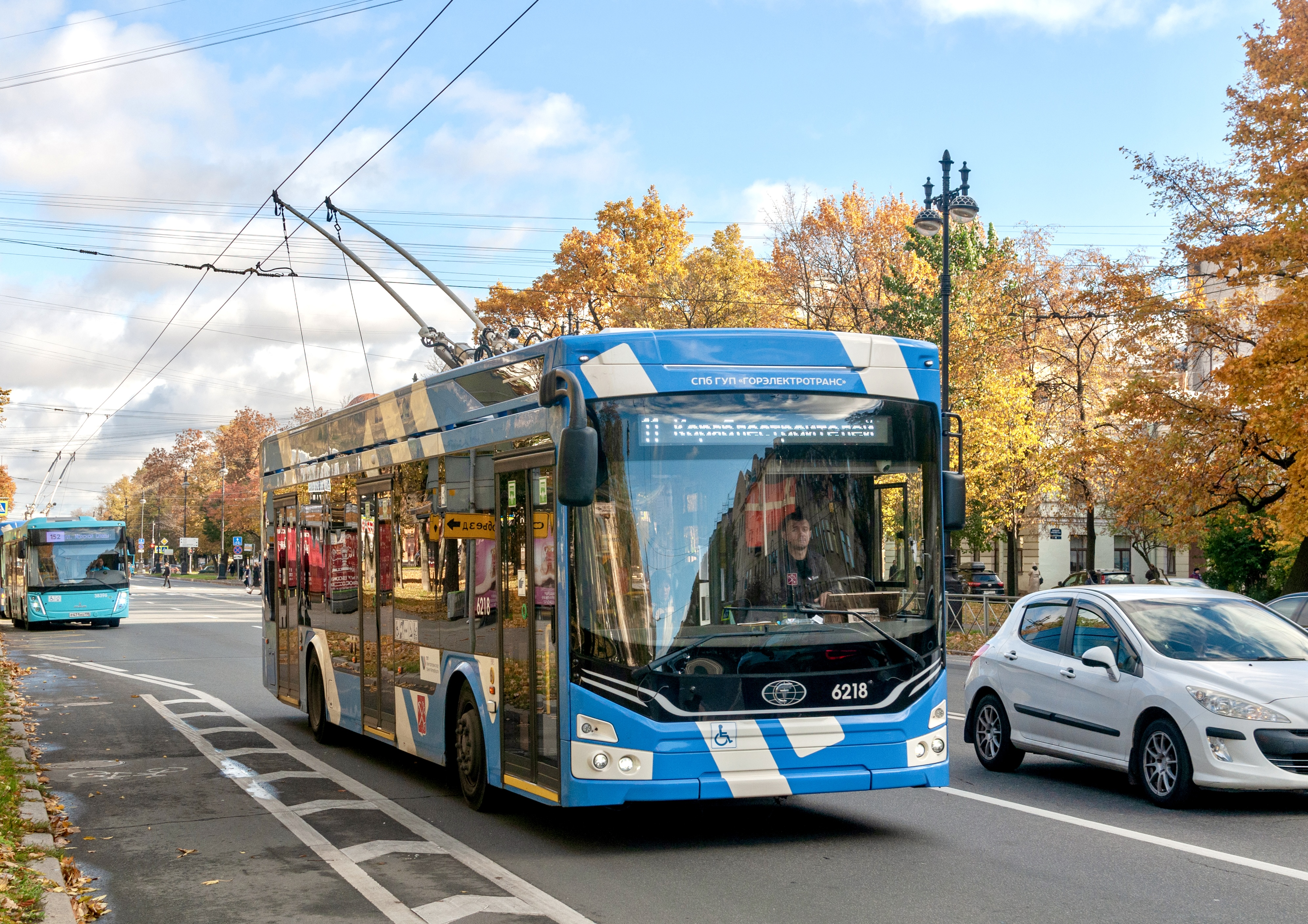

Operation
- Locale: Saint Petersburg, Russia
- Routes: 48
- Operator: SPb GUP "Gorelektrotrans"

The Saint Petersburg trolleybus system (Russian: Санкт-петербургский троллейбус) is an integral part of the public transport network of Saint Petersburg, Russia. It was inaugurated on 21 October 1936, making it the fourth trolleybus system to be established in the former Soviet Union. The system is run by the state-owned municipal enterprise Gorelektrotrans.

After the closure of the Moscow trolleybus system in 2020, the Saint Petersburg network became the largest trolleybus system in Russia. By number of routes and fleet size, it ranks among the largest trolleybus networks worldwide. As of early 2024, the system comprises 48 routes, served by a fleet of 931 vehicles operating from five depots.

Since the late 2010s, several trolleybuses have been equipped with batteries for limited off-wire operation, referred to in Russia as trolleybuses with increased autonomous range (Троллейбус с увеличенным автономным ходом).

== History ==
=== Soviet period ===
The first trolleybus line in Leningrad (now Saint Petersburg) opened on 21 October 1936. The route connected Red Square (now Alexander Nevsky Square) with Labor Square via Nevsky Prospect. The initial fleet consisted of the Soviet-made YaTB-1 model.

Operations were suspended on 20 November 1941 due to power shortages during the Siege of Leningrad in World War II. Service resumed on 24 May 1944. After the war, the network expanded rapidly, reaching major avenues and key transport hubs. By 1990, the system had 50 routes and more than 1,400 vehicles in operation.

In 1982, Leningrad introduced trolleybus trains consisting of two coupled ZiU-9 vehicles using the Vladimir Veklich system. By the early 1990s, over 100 such trains were in service, mainly on busy cross-city routes.

=== Post-Soviet period ===
Economic difficulties in the 1990s led to reduced investment, resulting in the closure of some peripheral lines. Core routes continued operating, but many older vehicles were retired. From the late 2010s, the city administration began a fleet renewal and infrastructure modernization program, including procurement of trolleybuses capable of operating on battery power over sections without overhead wires.

== Battery-assisted operation ==
Since 2017, trolleybuses with In-Motion Charging (IMC) have been introduced in Saint Petersburg. These vehicles charge their batteries while connected to overhead wires, allowing them to operate for limited distances without catenary infrastructure.

The first route using this technology (Route No. 23) opened on 12 December 2017.

Battery-assisted operation is primarily used to:

- extend routes to areas without overhead wires,
- allow temporary diversions during roadworks,
- operate along streets where overhead infrastructure was removed (e.g., around Kazan Cathedral on Nevsky Prospect). On Route 17, trolleybuses run in battery mode along this section before reconnecting to the overhead network.

As of early 2024, 17 of the system's 48 routes operate with IMC-equipped trolleybuses.

== Rolling stock ==
=== Current fleet ===
By the mid-2020s, all high-floor trolleybus models were retired. The active fleet consists primarily of low-floor vehicles from Russian and Belarusian manufacturers:

- PK Transport Systems (PKTS): PKTS-6281 "Admiral" (standard and IMC versions)
- Belkommunmash: BKM-321, BKM-32100D (IMC), BKM-433 "Vitovt Max II"
- Trans-Alfa: VMZ-5298.01 "Avangard", VMZ-6215
- Trolza: Trolza-5275 "Optima", Trolza-5265 "Megapolis"
- Sinara: Sinara-6254

Operations are conducted from four dedicated trolleybus depots and one combined tram–trolleybus depot.

=== Historical fleet ===
- YaTB-1 (1936–1959)
- LK-5 (1937–1941)
- MTB-82 (1946–1975)
- ZiU-5 (1960–1993)
- ZiU-9 (1972–2020)
- ZiU-10 (1989–2022)

== See also ==
- Saint Petersburg Metro
- Saint Petersburg tram
- Transport in Saint Petersburg
