= Trolleybuses in Arnhem =

Public transport system in the city of Arnhem, Netherlands

Arnhem trolleybus
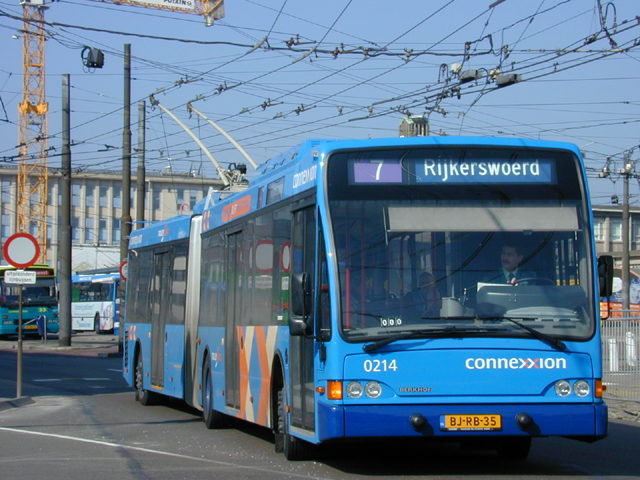

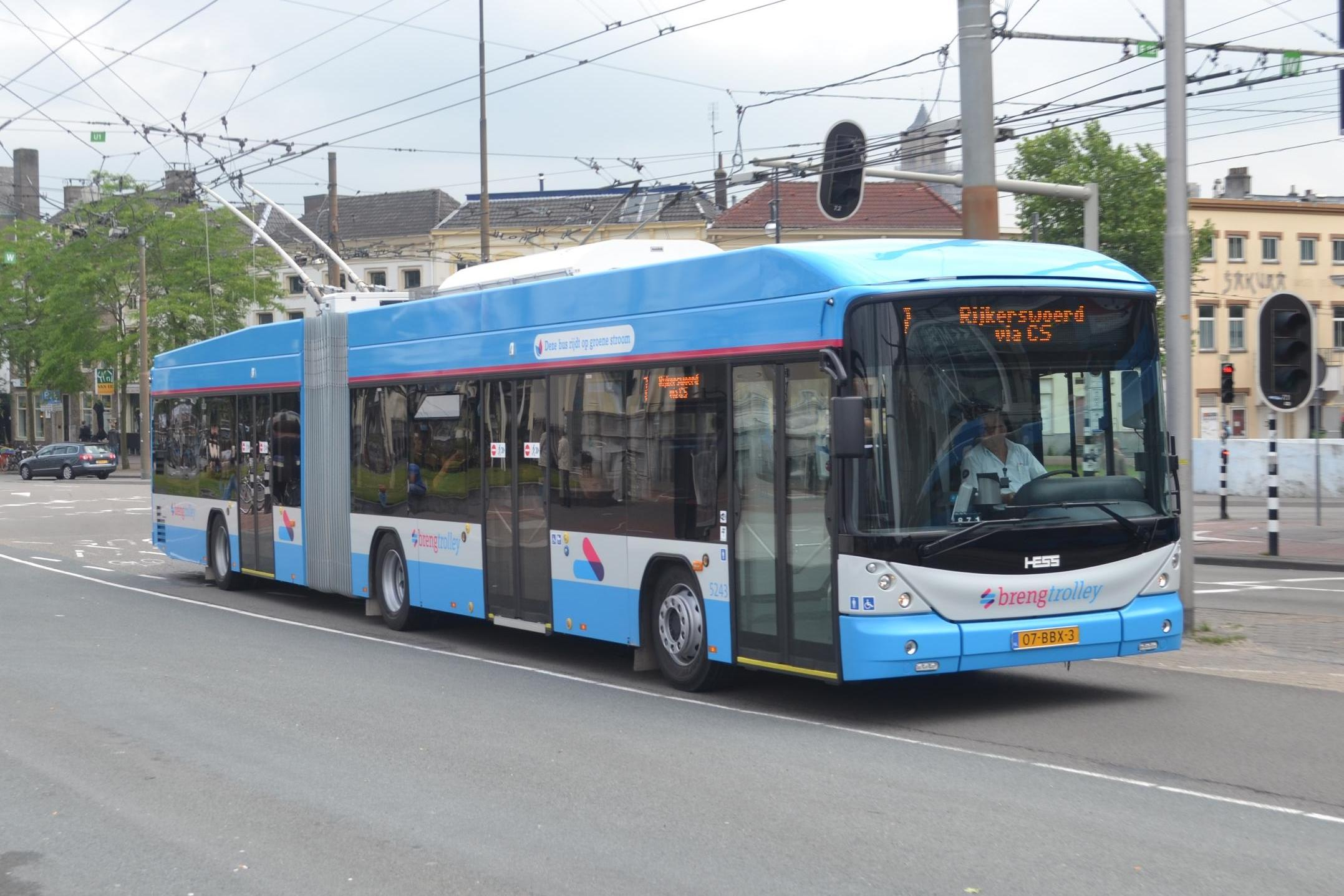

Overview
- Locale: Arnhem, Netherlands
- Transit type: Trolleybus
- Number of lines: 14

Operation
- Began operation: 5 September 1949
- Operator: Transdev (under the brand RRReis)

The Arnhem trolleybus system is the trolleybus system in the city of Arnhem. It is unique in the Netherlands as the only trolleybus system still operating in that country. It opened on 5 September 1949.

== Active routes ==
From 2002 until 2023, the Arnhem trolleybus network was remarkably stable, consisting of six routes numbered 1, 2, 3, 5, 6 and 7. This changed in December 2023, when reconstruction of the Velperweg led to the eastern section of line 1 between Arnhem CS and Velp being separated as line 21. Initially line 21 was operated by conventional buses, while line 1 was shortened from De Laar West to Arnhem CS.

Expansion of the trolleybus network followed in May 2024, when intercity route 352 Wageningen - Arnhem CS was electrified using 10 newly delivered Solaris Trollino vehicles equipped with traction batteries. Trolleybuses operated in battery mode between Wageningen and d'Oude Herbergh (~65% of the route).

On 28 June 2026 a new 10-year public transport concession entered into force, which brought significant reorganization of the public transport network in the Arnhem-Nijmegen region. As part of the new concession 50 rigid and 19 articulated Yutong trolleybuses with traction batteries were delivered. These served to significantly expand the number of routes operated by trolleybuses. As of November 2026 the following routes are fully or partially operated by trolleybuses (alongside battery electric buses):

Line	Type	Route
1	City	Arnhem CS - Elderveld - De Laar West
2	City	Arnhem CS - Kronenburg - De Laar West
3	City	Burgers' Zoo - Arnhem CS - Het Duifje
4	City	Het Duifje - Kronenburg - Schuytgraaf
5	City	Schuytgraaf - Arnhem CS - Presikhaaf
7	City	Rijkerswoerd - Arnhem CS - Geitenkamp
9	City	Arnhem CS - Hoogkamp - Schaarsbergen
11	City	Arnhem CS - Malburgen West - Elden
32	Suburban	Arnhem CS - Kronenburg - Huissen Bergerden
36	Suburban	Arnhem CS - Arnhem Zuid - Driel - Heteren
62	Suburban	Arnhem CS - Arnhem Het Broek - Westervoort - Duiven
127	City	Arnhem CS - Velperpoort - Presikhaaf West
303	Intercity	Ede - Wageningen - Oosterbeek - Arnhem CS - Velp
306	Intercity	Arnhem Elsweide - Arnhem CS - Kronenburg - Elst - Oosterhout - Lent - Nijmegen CS - Nijmegen Heyendaal

== Fleet ==
Since 28 June 2026 the Arnhem trolleybus fleet numbers 89 vehicles, which is an increase from the 50 vehicles which served under the previous concession and public transport network.

Count	Type	Fleet numbers	Lines served	Notes
19	Yutong U18T	5196 - 5214	303	ComfortRRReis brand; equipped with 255 kWh traction battery
10	Hess SwissTrolley 4	5264 - 5273	5, 7	
10	Solaris Trollino 18 MetroStyle	5275 - 5284	5, 7	Equipped with 91 kWh traction battery
31	Yutong U12T	5444 - 5474	1, 2, 3, 4, 5, 7, 9, 11, 32, 36, 62, 127	Equipped with 255 kWh traction battery
19	Yutong U12T	5475 - 5493	303, 306	ComfortRRReis brand; equipped with 255 kWh traction battery

== Media ==
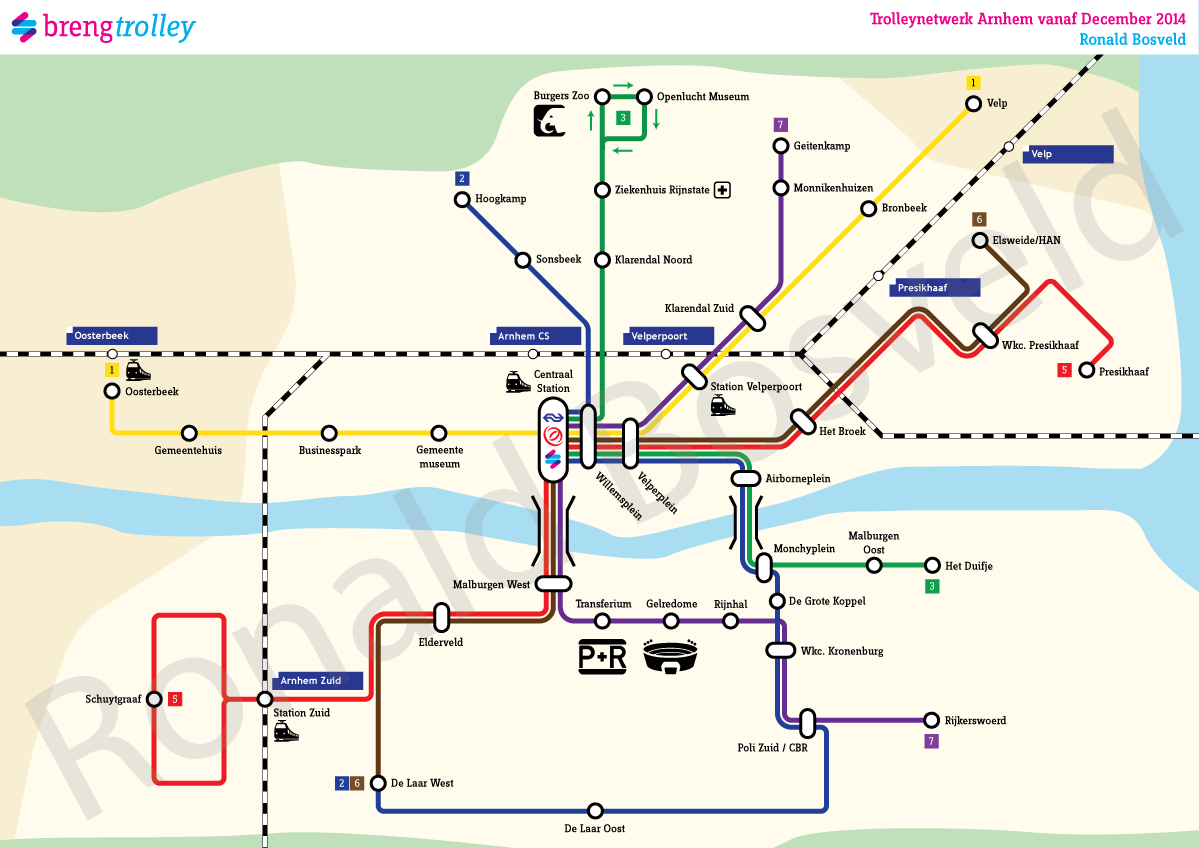
The Arnhem trolleybus network as valid from December 14th 2014

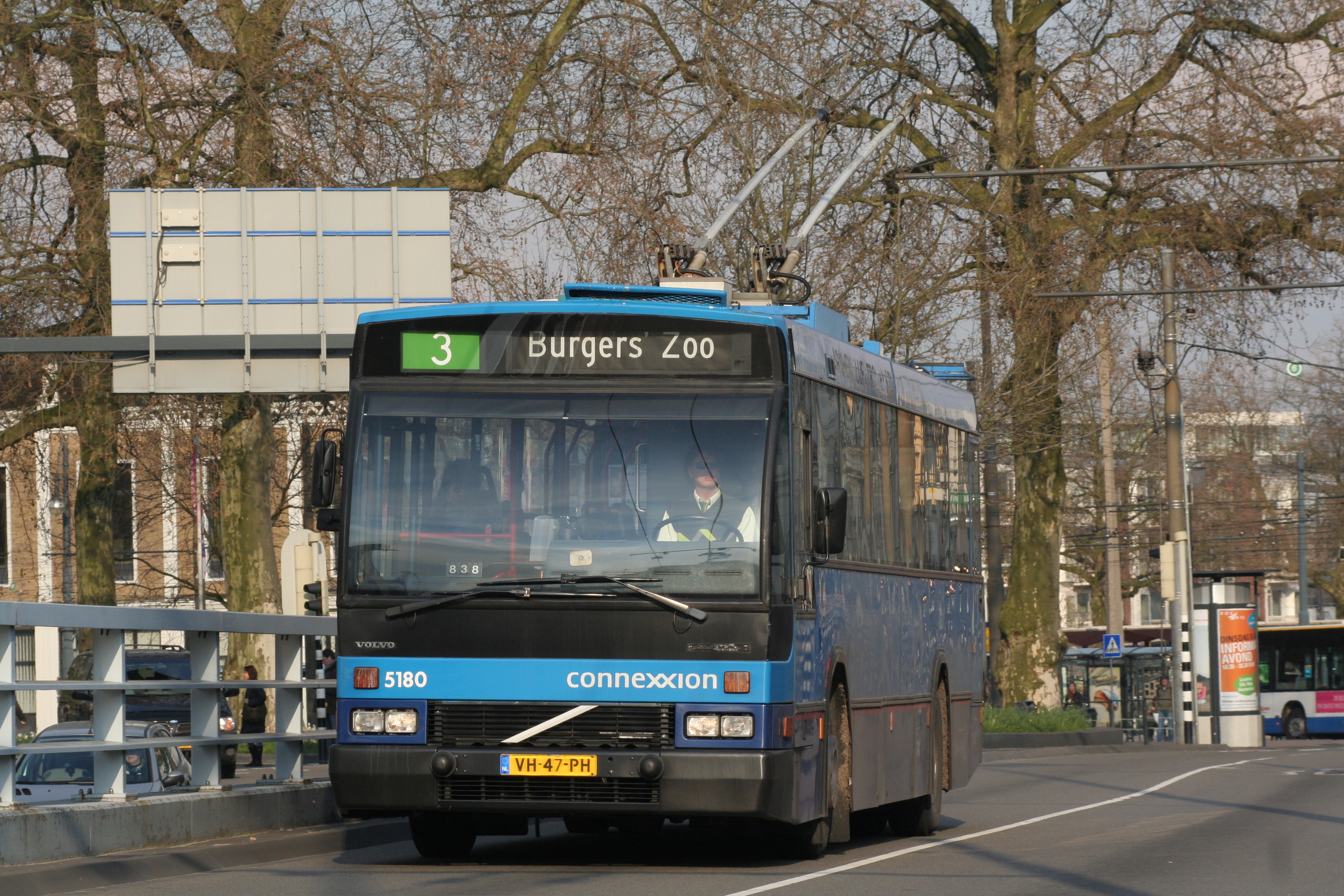
Den Oudsten B88 Trolley (no longer in use) on route 3

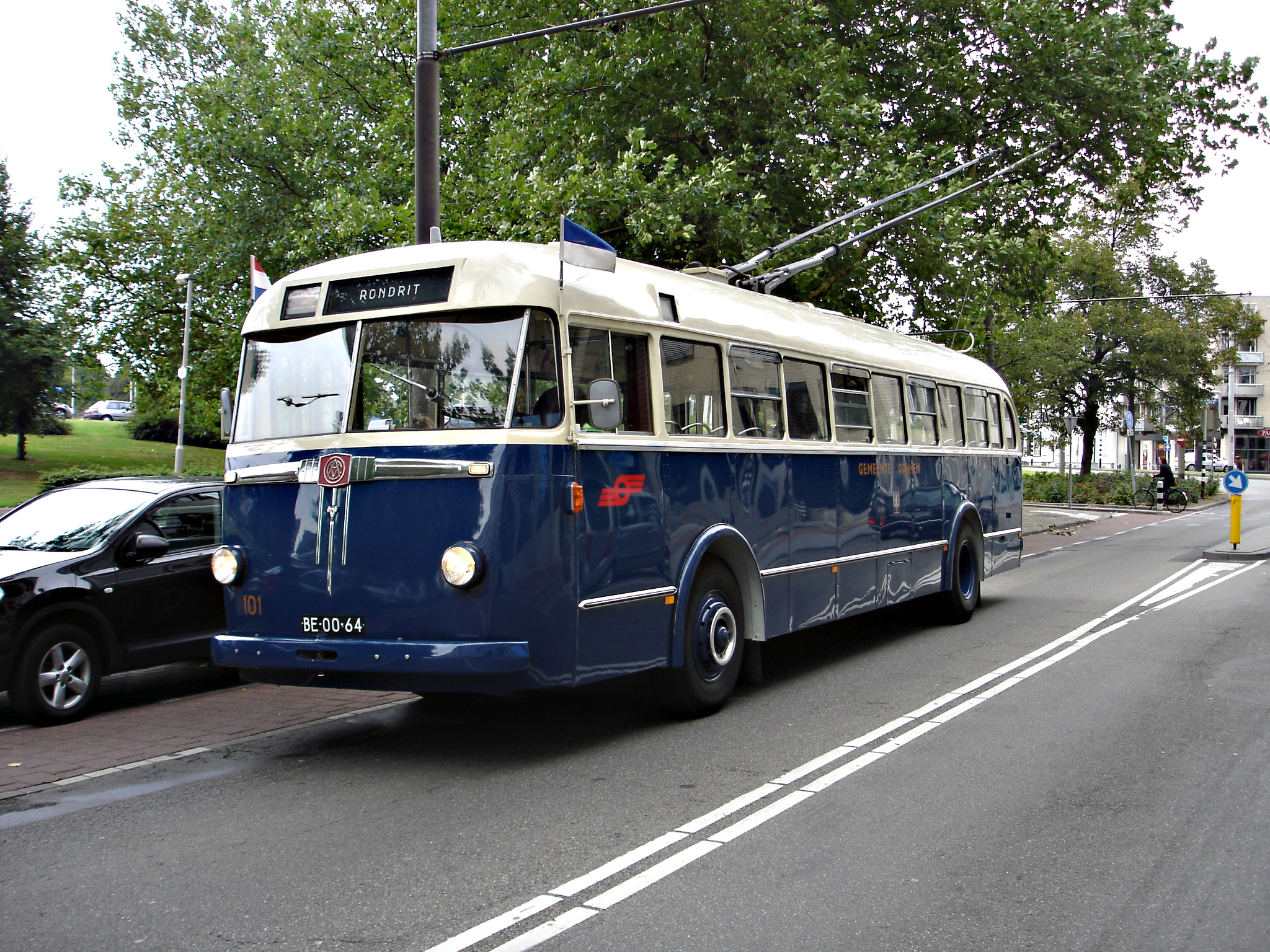
Preserved BUT - trolley 101 from 1949 on tour

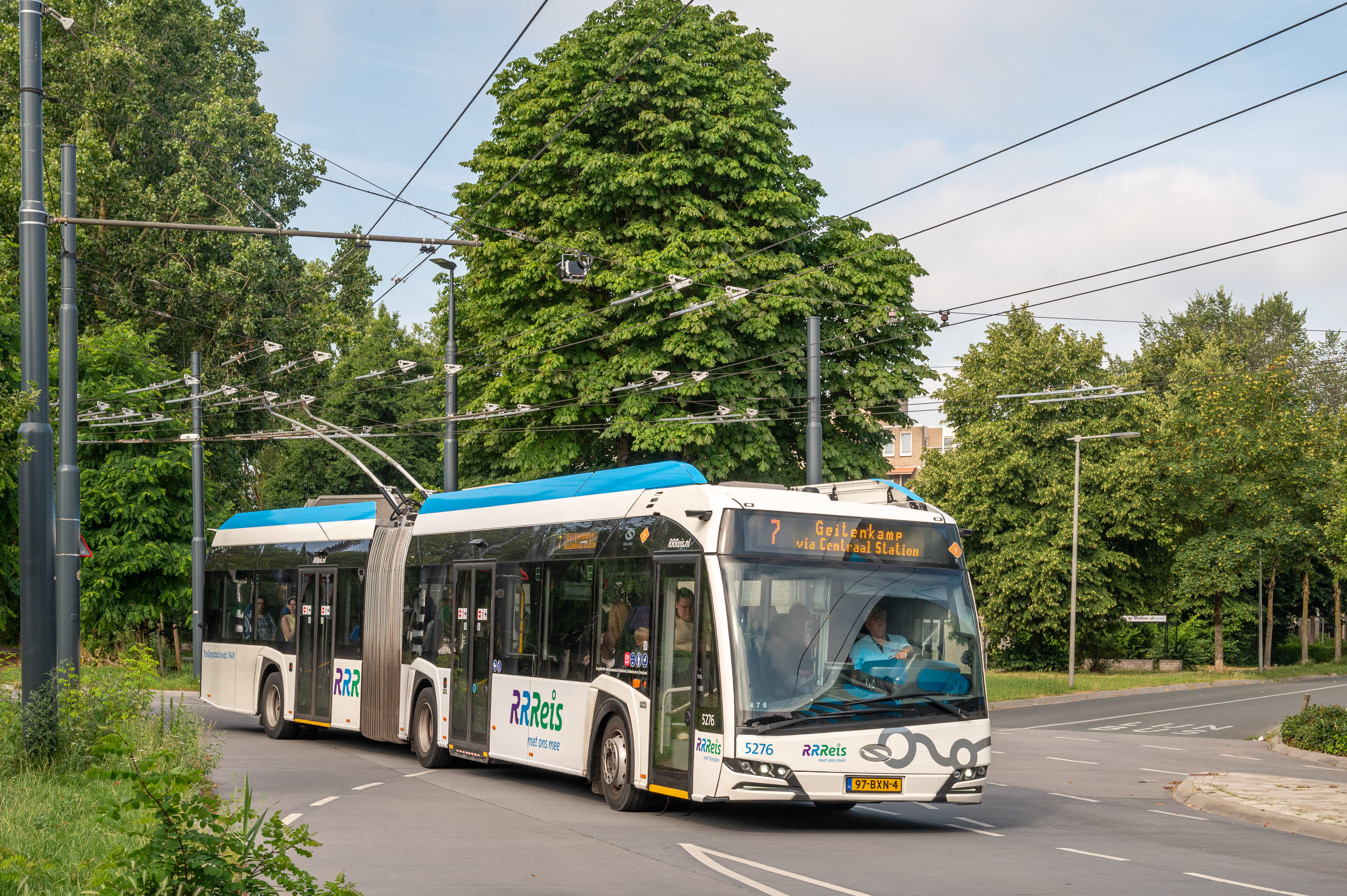
Solaris trolleybus on route 7 in 2026

Motor section of new trolleybus taken into service in Oct 2009

== See also ==
- British United Traction
