= BRT Marrakesh =

Bus rapid transit and trolleybus system in Morocco

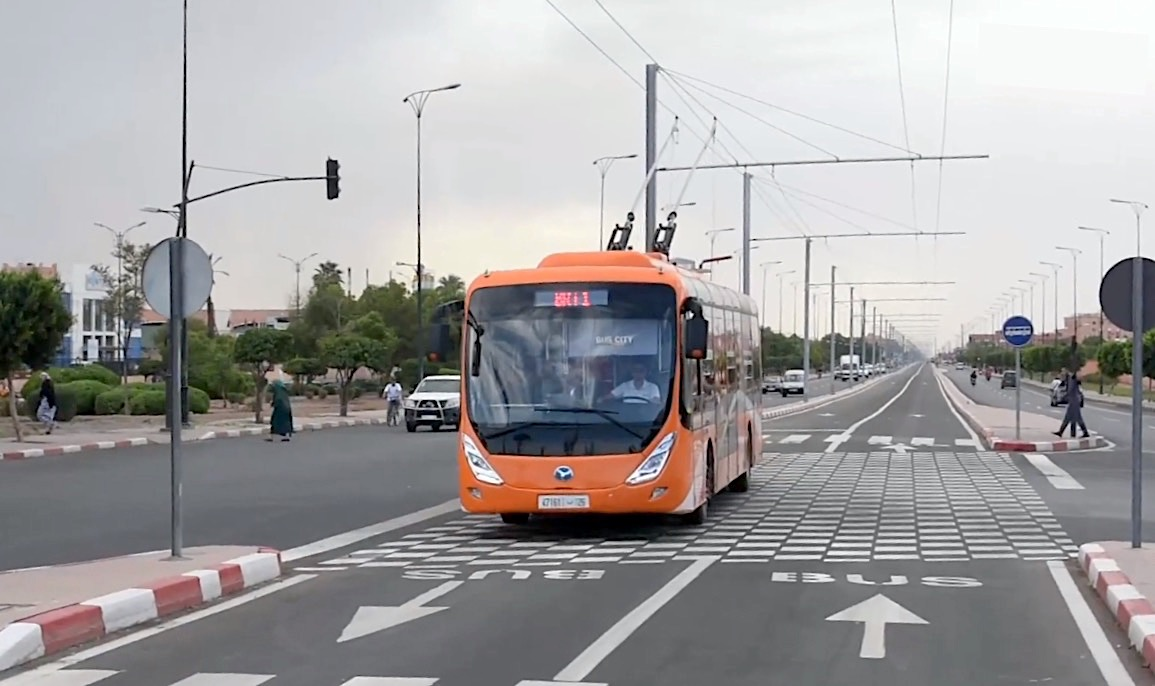
- Vehicle operating in trolleybus mode in 2017

Overview
- Owner: City of Marrakesh
- Locale: Marrakesh, Morocco
- Transit type: Bus rapid transit Trolleybus
- Number of lines: 1
- Number of stations: 8

Operation
- Began operation: 29 September 2017; 9 years ago

Technical
- System length: 8 km (5.0 mi), of which 3 km (1.9 mi) is wired for operation as trolleybus

BRT Marrakesh is a bus rapid transit system that is also partly trolleybus in Marrakesh, Morocco. It opened on 29 September 2017. The system is officially known as Bus à Haut Niveau de Service de Marrakech (BHNS de Marrakech), which equates to the English term Bus Rapid Transit, or BRT, of Marrakesh. Although the buses are equipped to operate as trolleybuses, only part of the system is fitted with overhead wiring for trolleybuses, and the vehicles operated on batteries over the other sections.

The transit system aims at increasing the public transport ridership and providing a tram-like service in a cheap and environmental way. The electricity powering the vehicles comes from solar power.

== Lines ==
The initial route in operation runs from Bab Doukkala in the city center to Al Massira. It is marked as route A at stops, but trolleybuses in service display only "BRT1" on their destination signs. This route is 8 km (5.0 mi) long, of which 3 km (1.9 mi) is wired for trolleybus operation. The vehicles are powered on the other sections solely by their batteries, which are recharged from the overhead trolley wires.

Other lines are expected to start operations by the end of 2019.

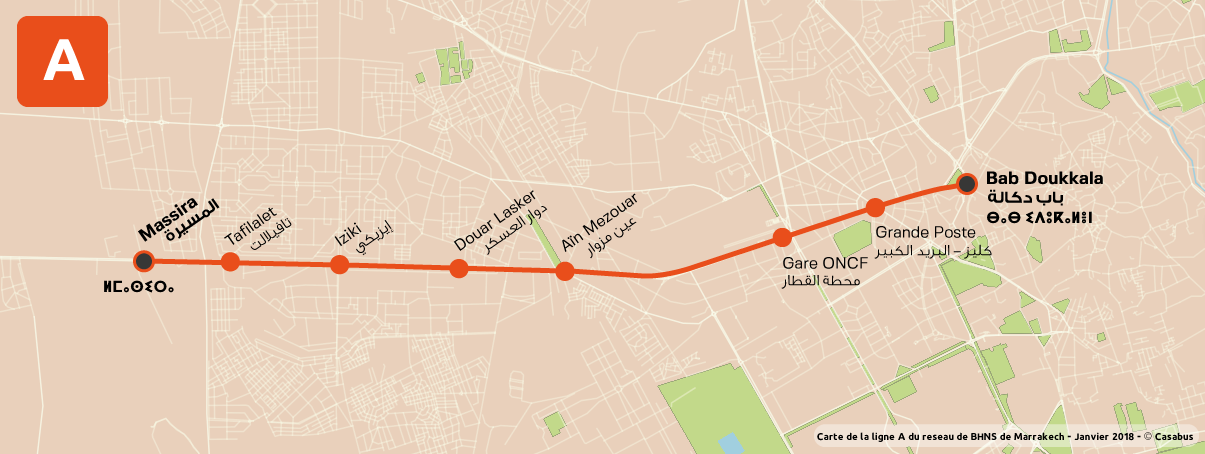
Line A of BRT Marrakesh.

== Fleet ==
The fleet consists of 10 low-floor trolleybuses built by Dongfeng Yangtse, model Veyron G92 or WG6120BEVHR. At the time of the system's opening in September 2017, it was reported that an additional 20 trolleybuses were on order, and that these would be 18-metre articulated units.
