= Dual-mode bus =

Bus that can operate from two fuel sources

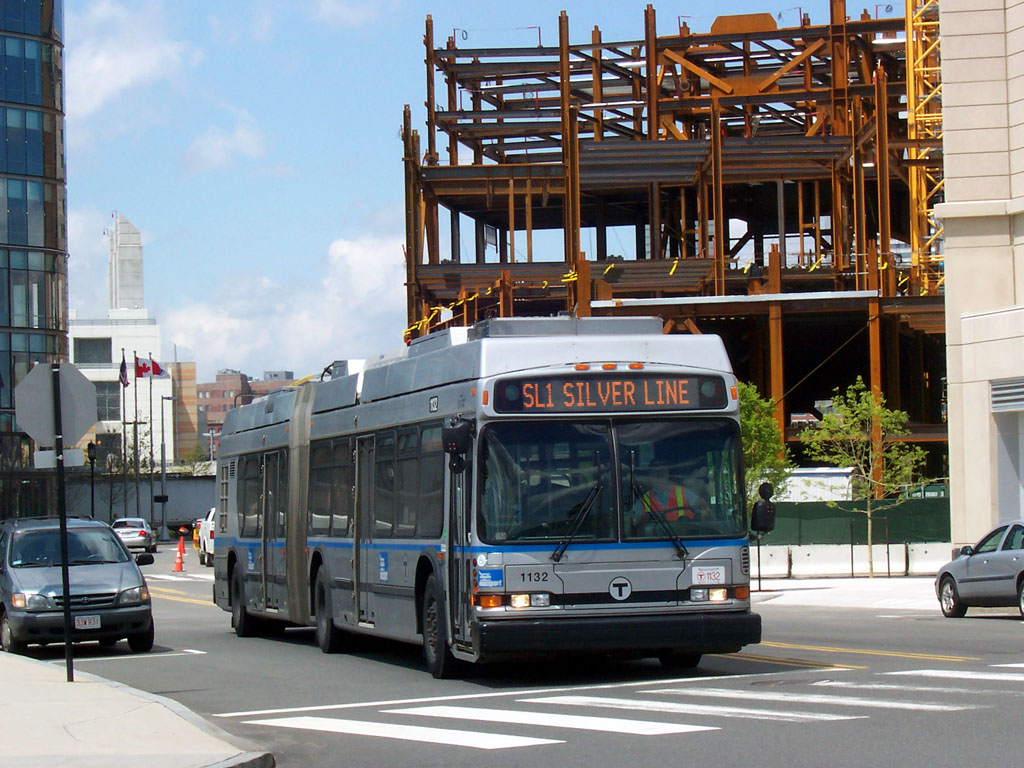
Boston Neoplan DMA-460LF dual-mode bus, operating in diesel mode (with its trolley poles lowered)

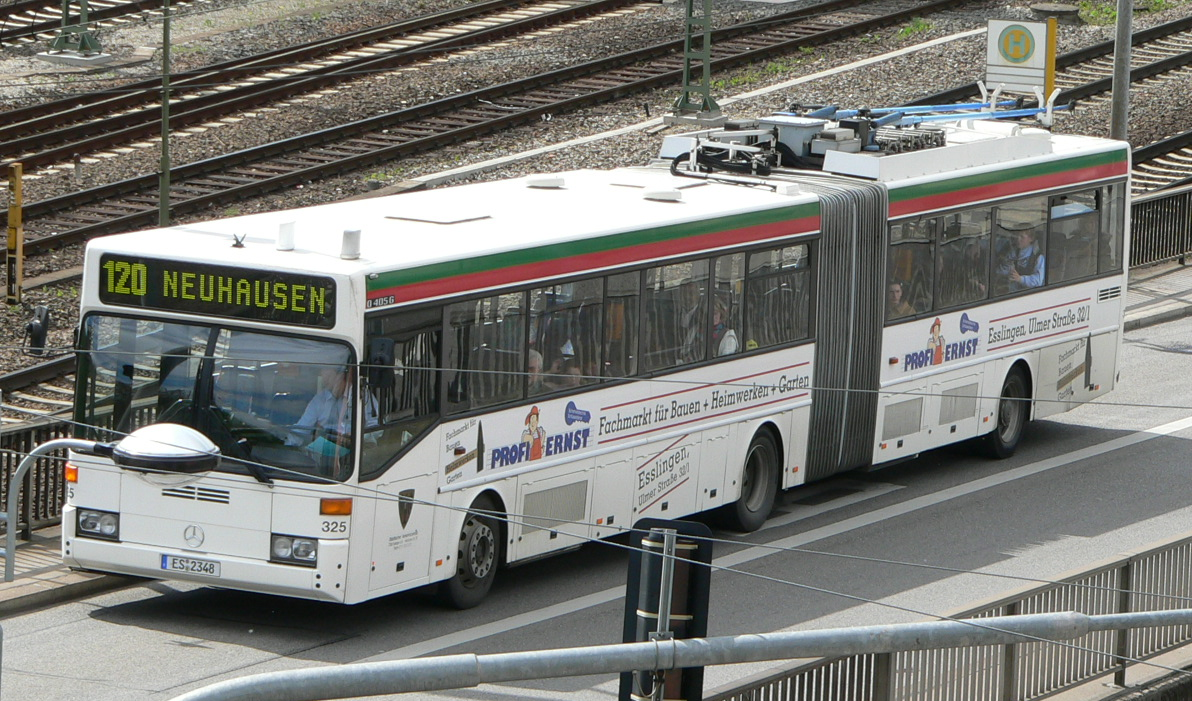
Esslingen dual-mode bus of the type Mercedes-Benz O 405 GTD, also operating in diesel mode.

A dual-mode bus, also known as a duobus or bimodal bus, is a bus that can operate using two independent power sources. Most commonly, this refers to a vehicle that combines the features of an electric trolleybus, drawing power from overhead lines, and a conventional bus, powered by a diesel engine.

The term is primarily used for buses with two full-fledged, powerful propulsion systems, designed for regular service on routes that are only partially equipped with overhead wires. This distinguishes them from trolleybuses equipped with a small auxiliary power unit (APU), which is only intended for short-distance, low-speed maneuvers such as bypassing obstacles or navigating depots. A separate term, IMC Electric bus (for In-Motion Charging), is used for modern vehicles that combine overhead wire operation with a large battery pack, allowing for significant wireless travel without a fossil fuel engine.

== Characteristics ==
=== Advantages ===
The primary advantage of a dual-mode bus is its flexibility. It can operate as a zero-emission electric vehicle in city centers or on heavily used corridors where overhead lines are installed, offering benefits like high acceleration, low noise, and no local air pollution. On suburban sections of the route or in areas where installing overhead lines is impractical or too expensive, it can switch to its diesel engine and operate with the same range and flexibility as a standard bus.

This capability allows for one-seat rides on routes that transition from wired to unwired sections, eliminating the need for passengers to transfer. It also provides operational redundancy; the bus can continue to run during power outages or when overhead lines are damaged by switching to its diesel engine. Furthermore, routes can be extended into new areas before the wire infrastructure is built.

=== Disadvantages ===
Despite their flexibility, dual-mode buses have several drawbacks that have limited their widespread adoption. The inclusion of two complete powertrains (an electric motor and control systems, plus a diesel engine, fuel tank, and transmission) significantly increases the vehicle's weight. For example, the electrical equipment on a Mercedes-Benz O 405 GTD added six tons to its weight. This extra weight leads to higher energy consumption in both modes of operation.

Dual-mode buses are also more expensive to purchase and maintain than either a standard trolleybus or a diesel bus. The complexity of the dual systems can lead to lower reliability and higher maintenance costs. The space required for the additional equipment can also reduce passenger capacity, impacting the vehicle's economic efficiency. Finally, the process of switching between power modes requires the bus to stop, which can add to overall journey times.

== History and decline ==
The concept of a vehicle that draws power from overhead lines while traveling along a track, and switches to battery power when operating on regular roads, already existed by the end of the 19th century.

In 1899, a vehicle appeared in Berlin that defied easy classification—part electric tram, part automobile. It featured a bow-type current collector mounted on its roof and a body resembling a streetcar, complete with three windows. Instead of conventional rail wheels, it rolled on four wooden wheels with iron tires—much like those found on a horse-drawn cart—supplemented by two smaller, flanged wheels positioned ahead of the front axle. Designed by the German firm Siemens & Halske, this curious hybrid—a cross between an electric tram and an automobile, and essentially a battery-powered trolleybus—served as the world’s first trolleybus, paving the way for the advancements we see today. When operating on tracks equipped with overhead lines, the vehicle drew power via its bow-type current collector; when traveling on streets without tracks, it switched to its onboard storage batteries. While on the tracks, the vehicle was guided by the two small, flanged wheels at the front. Upon moving onto regular streets, these guide wheels were retracted, and the bow-type current collector was lowered. The propulsion system consisted of four 4-horsepower electric motors, each driving one of the four wheels independently. This design—utilizing overhead lines whenever available—allowed for a smaller battery capacity, which in turn helped reduce the vehicle's overall weight.

It garnered significant attention for its efficiency, as the batteries could be recharged while the vehicle was drawing power from the overhead lines.

Early precursors to the modern dual-mode bus concept include the "All-Service Vehicle" in New Jersey and dual-power vehicles in several European cities. However, the term "Duo-Bus" was first popularized in Esslingen am Neckar, Germany, initially for a battery-trolleybus hybrid in the 1970s. When that proved unsuccessful, Esslingen introduced a diesel-trolleybus model in 1979, which became the template for the modern dual-mode bus.

The concept saw peak interest in the 1980s and 1990s, with several cities in Europe and North America adopting fleets. However, due to the operational challenges and high costs, many of these systems were short-lived. A significant number of dual-mode buses were prematurely retired, converted into either diesel-only buses or electric-only trolleybuses, or sold to other operators who did not use their dual-mode capability.

Since the 2000s, advances in battery technology have led to the rise of in-motion charging (IMC) electric buses. These vehicles offer the same operational flexibility as diesel dual-mode buses but without the emissions, weight, and maintenance complexity of a combustion engine, effectively making the classic diesel duobus concept largely obsolete. As of 2018, only two cities, Fribourg, Switzerland, and Boston, USA, were still operating diesel dual-mode bus systems. Fribourg (2021) and Boston (2023) have since retired their respective fleets of diesel dual-mode trolleybuses.

Fribourg replaced their entire dual-mode trolleybuses fleet with fully electric ones. Boston opted for diesel-electric hybrid buses.

== List of models ==
Excluding early precursors, a total of 438 series-production dual-mode buses have been built. The vast majority of these were articulated vehicles.

Production models of dual-mode buses
| Manufacturer | Type | Production years | Electrical equipment | Units built | Primary operators |
|---|---|---|---|---|---|
| Breda | ADPB 350 | 1988–1991 | AEG / Westinghouse | 236 | King County Metro (Seattle) |
| Renault | PER 180 H | 1982–1984 | (various) | 64 | Nancy, Saint-Étienne, Grenoble (France) |
| Daimler-Benz | Mercedes-Benz O405 GTD | 1986–1995 | AEG | 47 | Esslingen, Essen (Germany); Bergen (Norway), and others |
| Neoplan | AN460LF | 2004–2006 | Škoda | 32 | Massachusetts Bay Transportation Authority (Boston) |
| Neoplan | N 6121 | 1998 | Vossloh Kiepe | 27 | TL (Lausanne) |
| Volvo / Hess | Volvo B10M | 1987–1989 | BBC-Sécheron / ABB | 12 | TPF (Fribourg) |
| MAN / Hess | NGT 204 F | 2004 | Kiepe | 9 | TPF (Fribourg) |
| Daimler-Benz | Mercedes-Benz O305 GTD | 1983 | AEG | 4 | Esslingen, Essen (Germany) |
| Daimler-Benz | Mercedes-Benz O305 D/E (rigid) | 1979 | Bosch / Dornier | 2 | SVE (Esslingen) |
| Daimler-Benz | Mercedes-Benz O305 G D/E (articulated) | 1979 | Bosch / Dornier | 1 | SVE (Esslingen) |
| MAN | SG 240 H Duo | 1983 | Kiepe | 1 | Essener Verkehrs-AG (Essen) |
| MAN / Voith | MAN SL200 (prototype) | 1984 | BBC-Sécheron | 1 | Demonstrator vehicle |
| Daimler-Benz | Mercedes-Benz O405 GNTD | 1996 | Kiepe / ZF | 1 | Verkehrsbetriebe Zürich (Zürich) |
| Van Hool | AG300TD | 1993 | Kiepe | 1 | Connexxion (Arnhem) |

== Examples of use ==
- Seattle, Washington, USA: Operated 236 Breda ADPB 350 buses in its Downtown Seattle Transit Tunnel from 1990 to 2004. The buses ran on electricity in the tunnel and switched to diesel power for surface street routes. The fleet was retired and replaced by hybrid electric buses.
- Boston, Massachusetts, USA: Used 32 Neoplan AN460LF buses on the Waterfront portion of its Silver Line from 2005 to 2023. Electric power was used in the tunnel under the Fort Point Channel, while diesel power was used for surface streets and the Ted Williams Tunnel to Logan Airport.
- Esslingen am Neckar, Germany: One of the pioneering systems, operating various Mercedes-Benz models from 1979 until 2008.
- A hydrogen-powered bus was developed by Tokyo City University in 2009. It received a license plate from the Ministry of Land, Infrastructure, Transport and Tourism, becoming the first hydrogen engine bus in Japan to be legally permitted to operate on public roads. It was used as a shuttle bus between the university's campuses.

== See also ==
- Electric bus
- Electro-diesel locomotive, the railway equivalent
- Guided bus
- Hybrid electric bus
- IMC Electric bus
- List of buses
