= Car turntable =

Rotating platform for cars

Car on turntable in Louisville, Colorado.

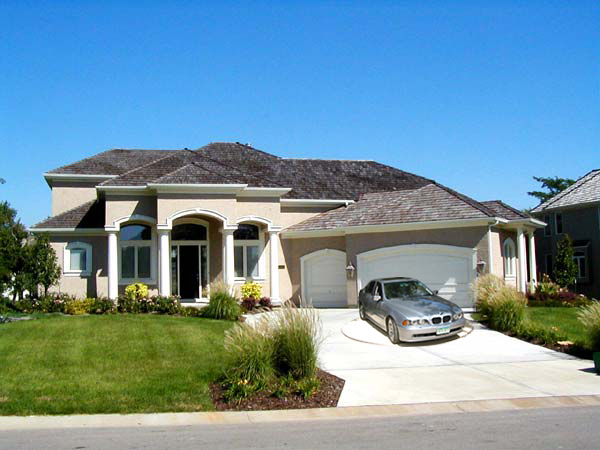
Car on turntable in Palm Beach, Florida.

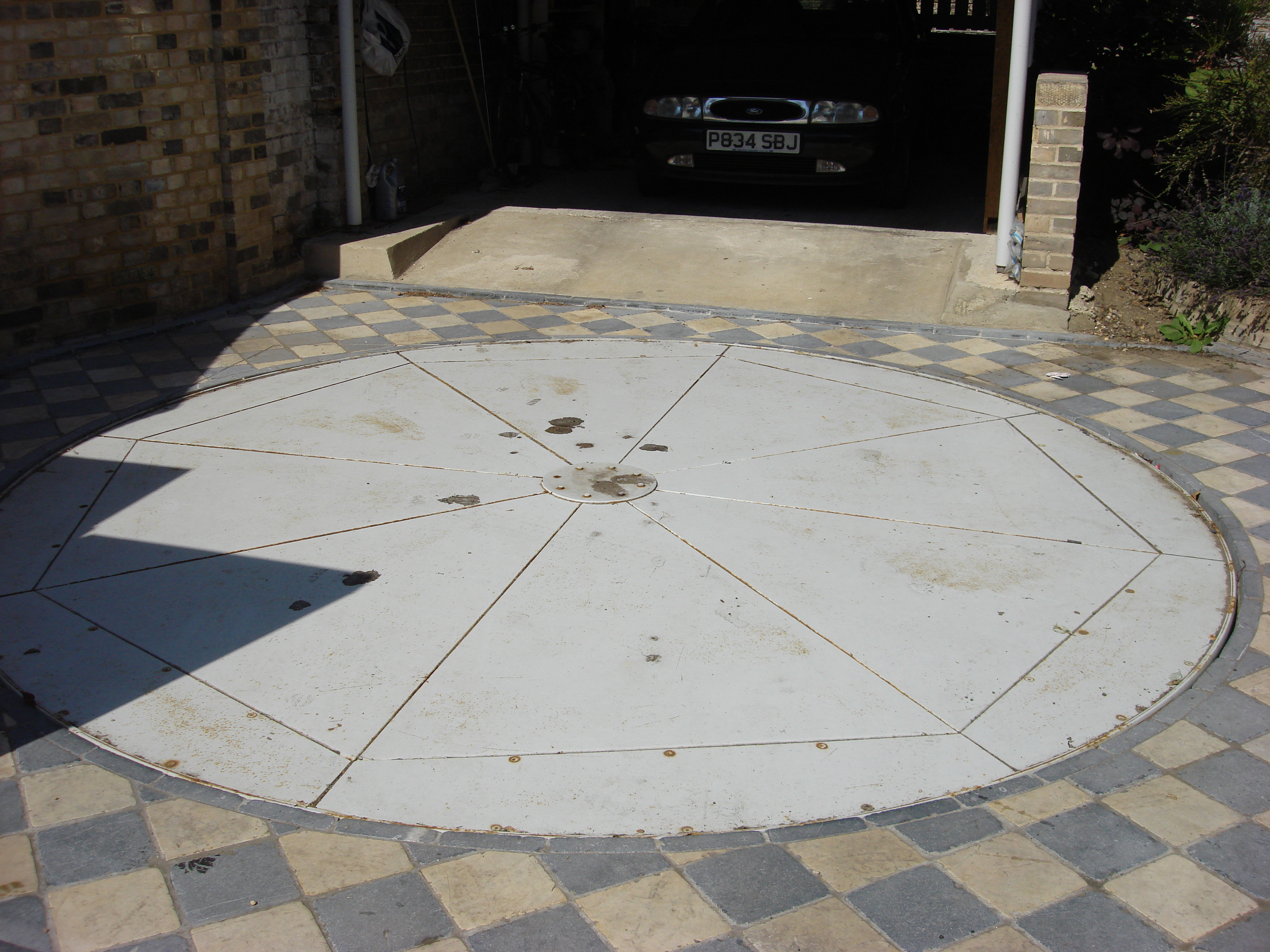
A car turntable in Sudbury, Suffolk UK. Designed and made by David Le Versha.

A car turntable or driveway turntable is a rotating platform designed for use by a car; they can be motorized or manually rotated and are usually installed in a driveway or in a garage floor. They rotate a motor vehicle to facilitate its easier or safer egress. Sometimes a local zoning prohibition of vehicles backing onto busy roadways prompts the installation of car turntables.

The residential car turntable traces its history to the steam locomotives turntable engine shed, or roundhouse. The first turntable engine shed was the North Midland Railway roundhouse, built in 1839 at Derby, England. The turntable allowed steam locomotives, which could not safety be run in reverse owing to their design, to be rotated to a forward position.

The car turntable has existed nearly as long as the mass-produced automotive. Henry Ford's Dearborn, Michigan Fair Lane Estate garage (Estate construction began in 1914 and was completed in 1916) included an automobile turntable.

The architect Frank Lloyd Wright designed and implemented several residential vehicle turntables including the 1922 Doheny Ranch Estate in Beverly Hills, California, designed but never built for Edward L. Doheny, a Los Angeles oil tycoon and the Westcott House built in 1908 in Springfield, Ohio, for Burton J. Westcott, designer of the Westcott automobile and founder of the Westcott Motor Car Company.

Car turntables were first prevalent in Europe, as seen in the August 1930 issue of Modern Mechanics, which displays a turntable used in Paris’ narrow streets “so that cars and autos don’t have to go miles out of their way to find turning places”. Possibly due to the dense urban planning in Europe, Japan, South Korea, and Australia (among others) an earnest adoption of turntables began in the 1950s.

Escalating urban density in the United States, and increased awareness of back-over and reversing accidents primarily involving children has helped in popularity of vehicle turntables.

Two primary types of vehicle turntables are available: the above-ground version and the in-ground version. The two versions are analogous to an above-ground and an in-ground swimming pool. The above-ground version is not flush with the driveway or garage pad and does not require excavation. The in-ground version is flush with the driveway or garage pad and does require excavation.

The non-American turntables tend to be more utilitarian; the operator often spins their vehicle around by hand, and these manufacturers offer few options other than motorized versions. The newer developed U.S. turntables tend to cater to the consumer behavior of the American marketplace – some of these models offer microprocessor controls, safety engineering features, high vehicle weight capacities, lighting accessories and heated platters.

== Bus turntables ==
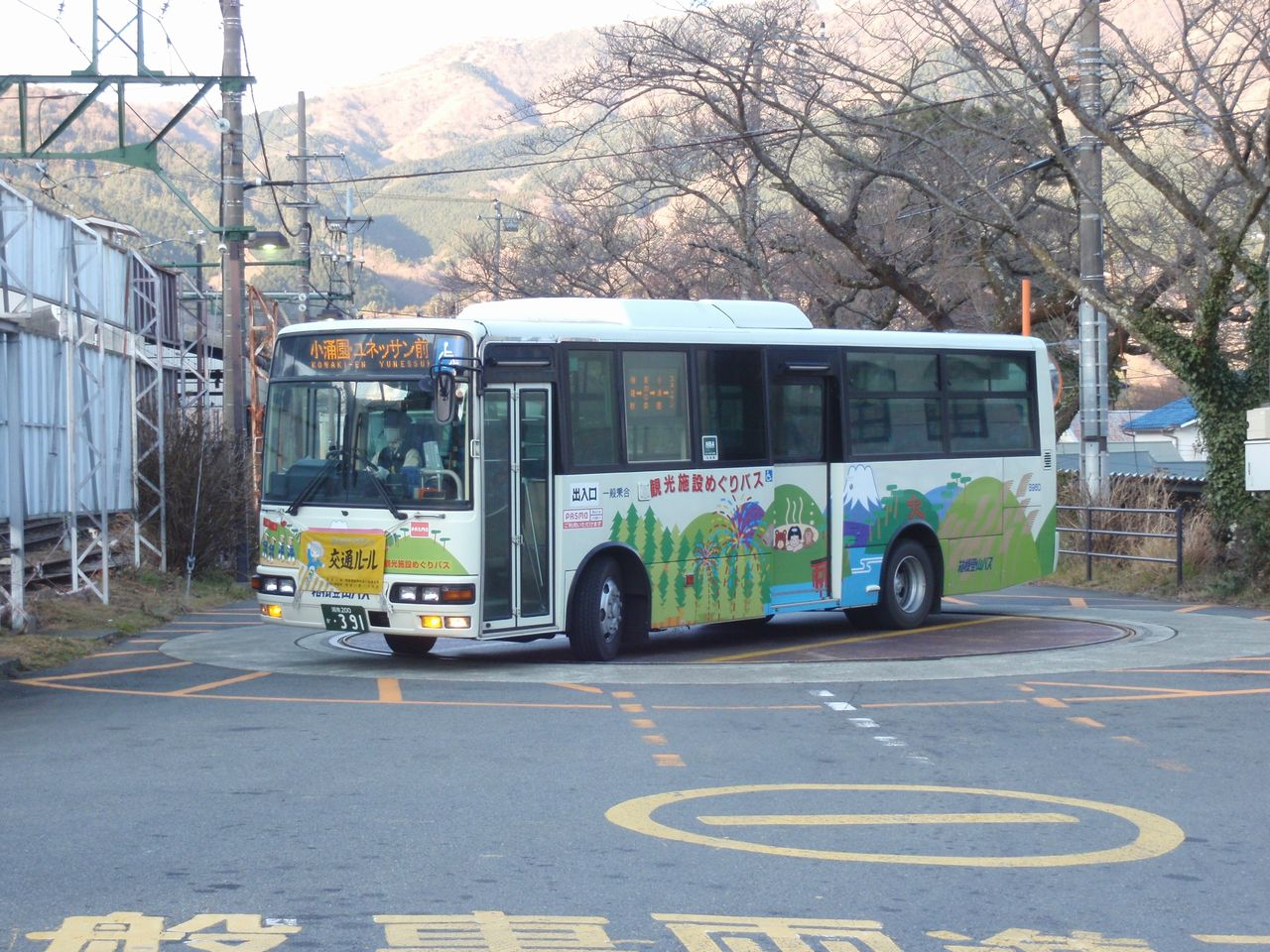
Bus using a turntable in Japan in 2010

Turntables have also been built for use by buses or trolleybuses in a few places. Examples of trolleybus turntables include the Christchurch trolleybus turntable, in Dorset, England (long disused but still extant); the Longwood trolleybus turntable, in Huddersfield, England (dismantled); one at the LT Isleworth trolleybus depot; one used on the Guadalajara trolleybus system in Mexico in the 1980s; and the Unterburg trolleybus turntable, at Burg, Germany, near Solingen, which was used by trolleybuses of the Solingen trolleybus system in regular service until November 2009 and remains in place for occasional use by heritage vehicles.

A bus turntable existed at Snow Hill in St Helier, Jersey, when it was used as a bus station between 1932 and 1964.

A bus platform, currently in use in Elantxobe, Basque Country, has a turntable.
