= Christchurch trolleybus turntable =

Turntable in Dorset, England

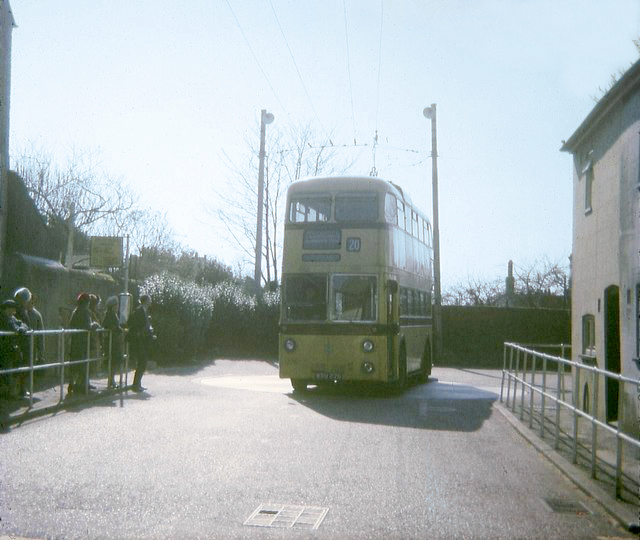
- The turntable on 5 April 1969, shortly before its closure.

- Location within England

General information
- Type: Turntable
- Location: Christchurch, Hampshire (now Dorset), England
- Coordinates: 50°43′59.6994″N 1°46′33.24″W
- Inaugurated: 19 June 1936
- Client: Bournemouth Corporation Transport

The Christchurch trolleybus turntable formed part of the Bournemouth trolleybus system, which served the town of Bournemouth and its environs, on the south coast of England. It is still in existence, and is now a Grade II listed building.

== History ==
Opened on 19 June 1936, the turntable was used to turn around all Bournemouth trolleybuses terminating at Church Street, Christchurch, a borough and town adjoining Bournemouth in the east.

Manually operated, the turntable remained in use until the closure of the Bournemouth trolleybus system on 20 April 1969. Cables leading from the overhead wires (positive and negative) to a pole-mounted switchbox near the entrance to the yard in which the turntable was situated are evidence that at one time power operation of the turntable was contemplated but there is no record that this was ever done.

== Significance ==
The Christchurch turntable is said to be one of only five trolleybus turntables ever to have been constructed worldwide. Three other such turntables are the similarly abandoned Longwood trolleybus turntable, in Huddersfield, West Yorkshire, England (in operation 1939–1940; demolished late 1980s), one at the former Isleworth London Transport Trolleybus depot, also demolished but can be seen on YouTube, (there were a few other turntables that were incorporated into the traversers at some trolleybus depots in London) and the Unterburg trolleybus turntable in Solingen, Germany (still in use for heritage trolleybus services). A fifth known trolleybus turntable was one used on the Guadalajara trolleybus system in Mexico in the 1980s, in a since-closed trolleybus-only tunnel in the city centre, on a temporary basis in 1982–1983 and again from 1985 until early 1988 (when the tunnel closed for the start of work to convert it for use by Guadalajara's light rail system).

== See also ==
- History of Bournemouth
- Transport in Bournemouth
- Listed buildings in Christchurch, Dorset
