= Longwood trolleybus turntable =

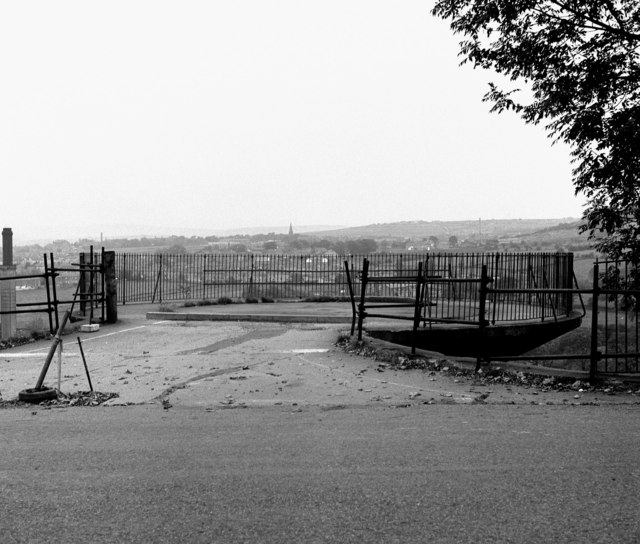
- The turntable in 1985, shortly before its demolition.

- Location within England

General information
- Type: Turntable
- Location: Huddersfield, West Yorkshire, England
- Coordinates: 53°39′3.87″N 1°50′37.22″W
- Inaugurated: 1 September 1939
- Client: Huddersfield Corporation Transport

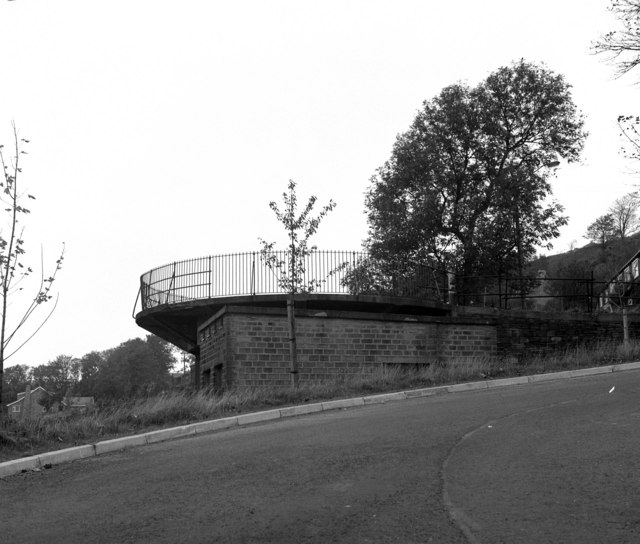
The turntable seen from below

The Longwood trolleybus turntable formed part of the Huddersfield trolleybus system, which served the market town of Huddersfield, in West Yorkshire, England.

== History ==
Opened on 1 September 1939, the turntable was used to turn around all Huddersfield trolleybuses terminating at Dod-Lea, where there was insufficient space for the trolleybuses to reverse their direction under their own power.

Manually operated, the turntable remained in use only until 1940. By that time, wartime conditions had led to the recruitment of female conductors who were not strong enough to help the driver operate the turntable, and blackout regulations had made it difficult for crew to see what they were doing after dark. The turntable was therefore replaced by alternative arrangements, and was not put back into service after the end of the war. However, it remained in situ for many years, until finally being removed in the second half of the 1980s.

== Significance ==
The Longwood turntable is said to be one of only four trolleybus turntables ever to have been constructed worldwide. Two other such turntables are the similarly abandoned Christchurch trolleybus turntable, in Bournemouth, England (in operation 1936–1969; now a Grade II listed building), and the Unterburg trolleybus turntable in Solingen, Germany (still in use for heritage trolleybus services). A fourth known trolleybus turntable was one used on the Guadalajara trolleybus system in Mexico in the 1980s, in a since-closed trolleybus-only tunnel in the city centre, on a temporary basis in 1982–1983 and again from 1985 until early 1988 (when the tunnel closed for the start of work to convert it for use by Guadalajara's light rail system).

== See also ==
- History of Huddersfield
- Transport in Huddersfield
