= Vehicle turntable =

Vehicle turntable can refer to

- Car turntable
- Turntable (rail)
