= Trolleybuses in Solingen =

German public transportation

Coordinates: 52°50′N 13°50′E

Solingen trolleybus system
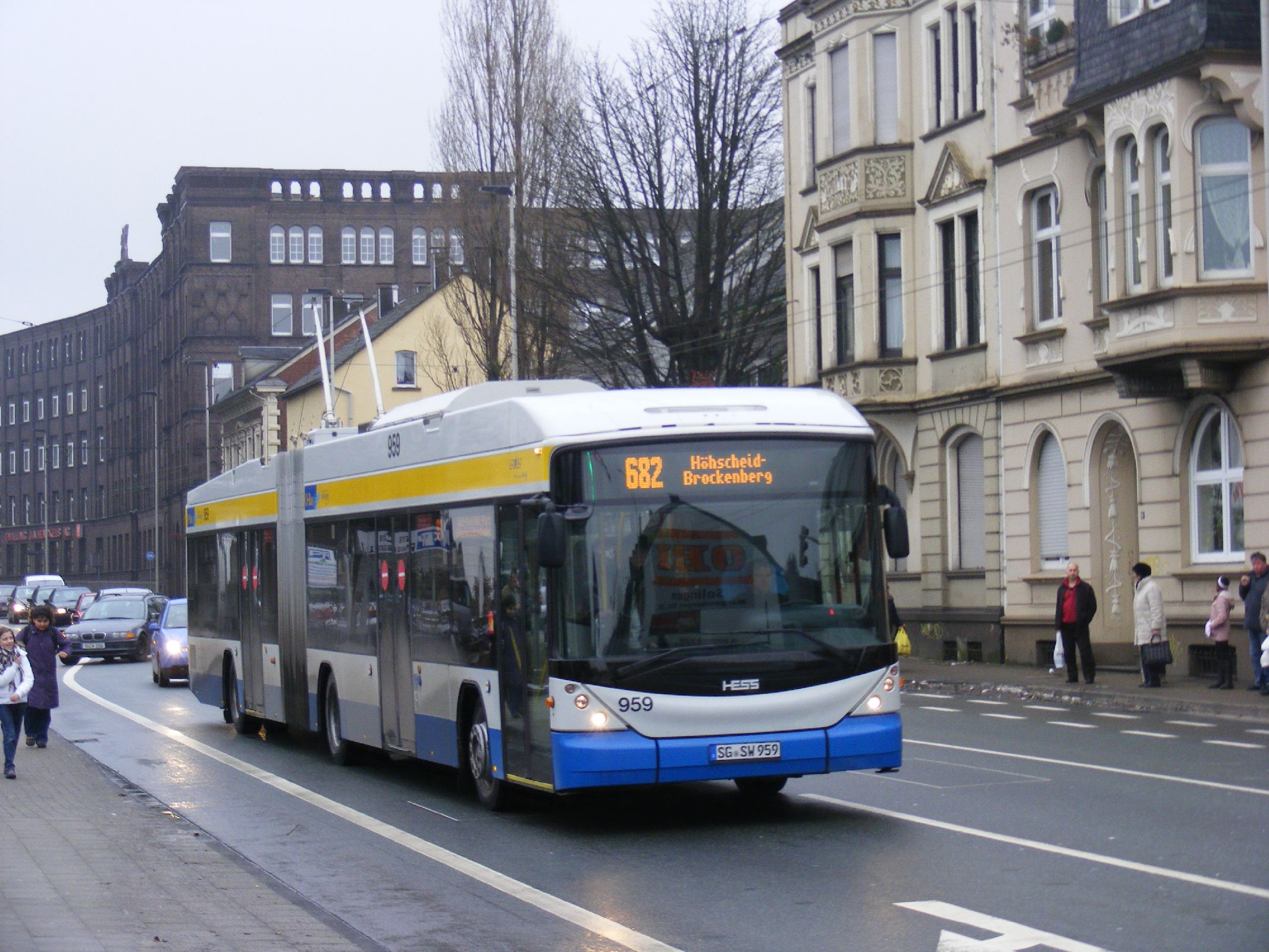
- A Hess trolleybus in Solingen, 2010

Operation
- Locale: Solingen, Germany; (also extends to Wuppertal)
- Open: 19 June 1952
- Status: Open
- Routes: 7
- Operator: Stadtwerke Solingen

Infrastructure
- Electrification: 600 V DC

Statistics
Overview
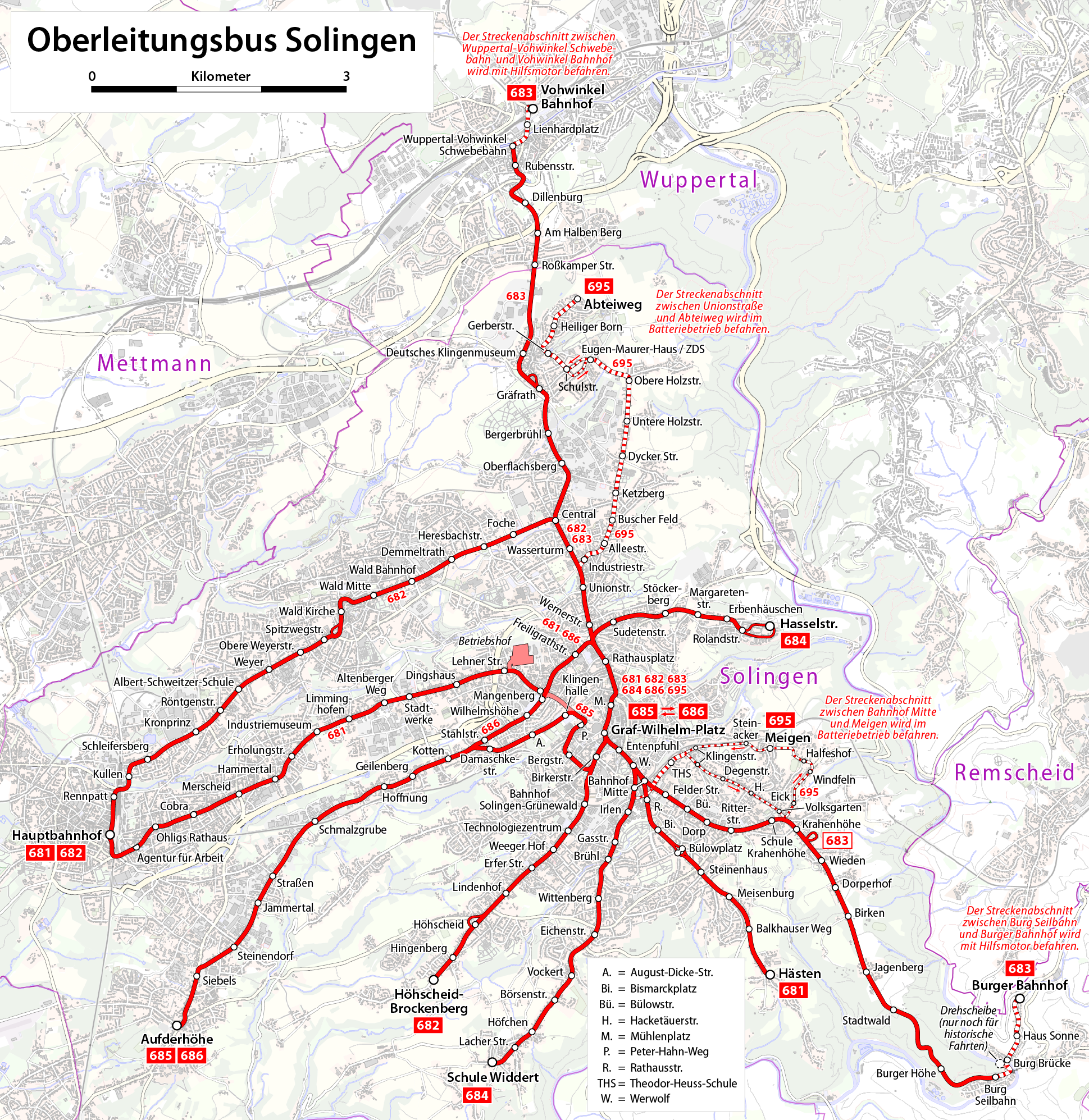
System map, 2020.
- Website: http://www.sobus.net Stadtwerke Solingen (in German)

The Solingen trolleybus (German: Oberleitungsbus Solingen), also known locally as Stangentaxi, serves the city of Solingen, in the federal state of North Rhine-Westphalia, Germany.

Opened on 19 June 1952, it is the largest of the three remaining trolleybus systems in Germany (the others being in Eberswalde and Esslingen am Neckar). The network centres on Graf-Wilhelm-Platz in Solingen city centre, and one of its lines extends into the neighbouring municipality of Wuppertal. It is operated by Stadtwerke Solingen, the municipal works company.

== History ==
The first trolleybus route was brought into service on 19 June 1952. The network was a conversion of the previous tram network. Conversion from tramway was completed on 2 December 1959. Extensions to the system were opened in 1981–82 – Schlagbaum to Hasselstraße (2.6 kilometres (1.6 mi)) and Höhscheid to Brockenberg (0.8 kilometres (0.50 mi)) respectively – and in 1993 from Aufderhöhe to Mangenberg/Graf-Wilhelm-Platz (8.2 kilometres (5.1 mi)).

The mid-1990s saw plans to replace the trolleybuses with diesel buses, but this was never pursued; trolleybuses being preferred over diesel vehicles because of superior acceleration and better suitability for the hilly terrain.

In 2009, the last non-articulated trolleybus was withdrawn from service. In November of the same year, route 683 was extended from its trolleybus turntable in Unterburg, which was incompatible with articulated buses, to Burger Bahnhof, using auxiliary diesel motors of the then-newest Hess trolleybuses. In August 2014, route 683 was similarly extended on its northern end from Vohwinkel Schwebebahn station to Vohwinkel railway station using diesel motors.

In the late 2010s, the Batterie-Oberleitungs-Bus (BOB) project started to be developed. Using in-motion charging on non-electrified streets, Stadtwerke Solingen plans to convert all of its diesel bus lines to electric operation. The first diesel bus route to be converted this way has been route 695 from Gräfrath Abteiweg to Meigen, which started electric service on 31 October 2019. It uses the existing trolleybus wires between Unionstraße and Bahnhof Mitte, with only short new sections being constructed at junctions of route 695 and at its terminuses.

In 2023, the Berkhof Premier AT18 generation of vehicles was withdrawn from service, being replaced by battery trolleybuses.

== Network ==
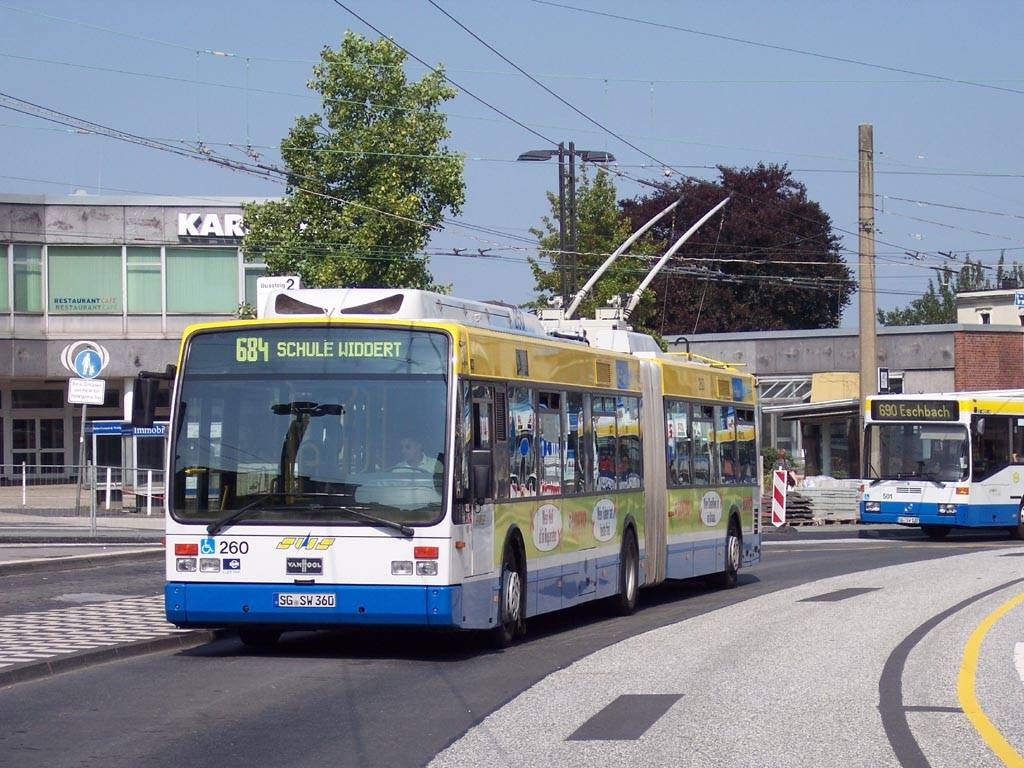
A Solingen trolleybus at Graf-Wilhelm-Platz

As of 2022, 7 lines are in operation, with weekday frequencies indicated:

Route	Itinerary	Frequency	non-electrified sections
681	Solingen Hbf (Ohligs) – Merscheid – Mangenberg – Graf-Wilhelm-Platz – Solingen Mitte station – Hästen	every 10 minutes	wholly electrified
682	Solingen Hbf (Ohligs) – Wald – Central – Graf-Wilhelm-Platz – Solingen-Grünewald station – Höhscheid-Brockenberg	every 10 minutes	wholly electrified
683	Wuppertal-Vohwinkel station – Vohwinkel Schwebebahn – Gräfrath – Central – Graf-Wilhelm-Platz – Solingen Mitte station – Krahenhöhe – Burg Brücke (Unterburg) – Burger Bahnhof	every 10 minutes, every 30 minutes between Krahenhöhe and Burg	Vohwinkel station – Vohwinkel Schwebebahn; Burg Seilbahn – Burger Brücke
684	Hasselstraße – Graf-Wilhelm-Platz – Solingen Mitte station – Schule Widdert	every 15 minutes	wholly electrified
685	Graf-Wilhelm-Platz – Klingenhalle – Schmalzgrube – Aufderhöhe	every 30 minutes	wholly electrified
686	Graf-Wilhelm-Platz – Mangenberg – Schmalzgrube – Aufderhöhe	every 30 minutes	wholly electrified
695	Gräfrath Abteiweg – Graf-Wilhelm-Platz – Solingen-Mitte station – Meigen	every 30 minutes	Abteiweg – Unionstraße; Mitte station – Meigen

Routes 681 and 682 interchange with the city's principal railway station – Solingen Hbf – which lies in the western suburb of Ohligs. Line 683 – at 14.5 kilometres (9.0 mi), by far the network's longest – also connects to the Wuppertal Schwebebahn at Vohwinkel, the northern end of the route and the western terminus of the Schwebebahn. The southern extent of 683 is the town of Burg an der Wupper, which contains Schloss Burg (Burg Castle). Burg is also home to the only surviving trolleybus turntable in the world.

Parts of routes 683 and 695 are non-electrified and are operated using electricity saved from in-motion charging, or diesel motors.

== Fleet ==
Vehicle Number	Count	Model	Type	In use since
253–258, 260-262, 264-270	17	Van Hool AG 300 T	Articulated low-floor	2002
951–965	15	Hess Swisstrolley 3	Articulated low-floor	2009
861–864	4	Solaris Trollino 18,75	Battery trolleybus	2018
865–880	16	Solaris Trollino 18 IV	Battery trolleybus	2021
201–208	8	Solaris Trollino 12 IV	Battery trolleybus	2022

== See also ==
- Solingen Hauptbahnhof
- List of trolleybus systems in Germany

== Bibliography ==
- Kenning, Ludger; Lehmann, Jürgen (2011). Obusse in Deutschland [Trolleybuses in Germany] (in German). Vol. Band 2: Nordrhein-Westfalen, Hessen. Nordhorn: Kenning. ISBN 9783933613318.
- Lehmann, Jürgen (2002). Der O-Bus in Solingen [The Trolleybus in Solingen] (in German). Nordhorn: Kenning. ISBN 3933613558.
- Walther, Christian (2002). 50 Jahre Obus in Solingen [Fifty Years of Trolleybuses in Solingen] (in German). Freiburg: EK-Verlag. ISBN 3882558423.
