= Unterburg trolleybus turntable =

Disused trolleybus turntable

Coordinates: 51°8′14.70012″N 7°8′49.45848″E

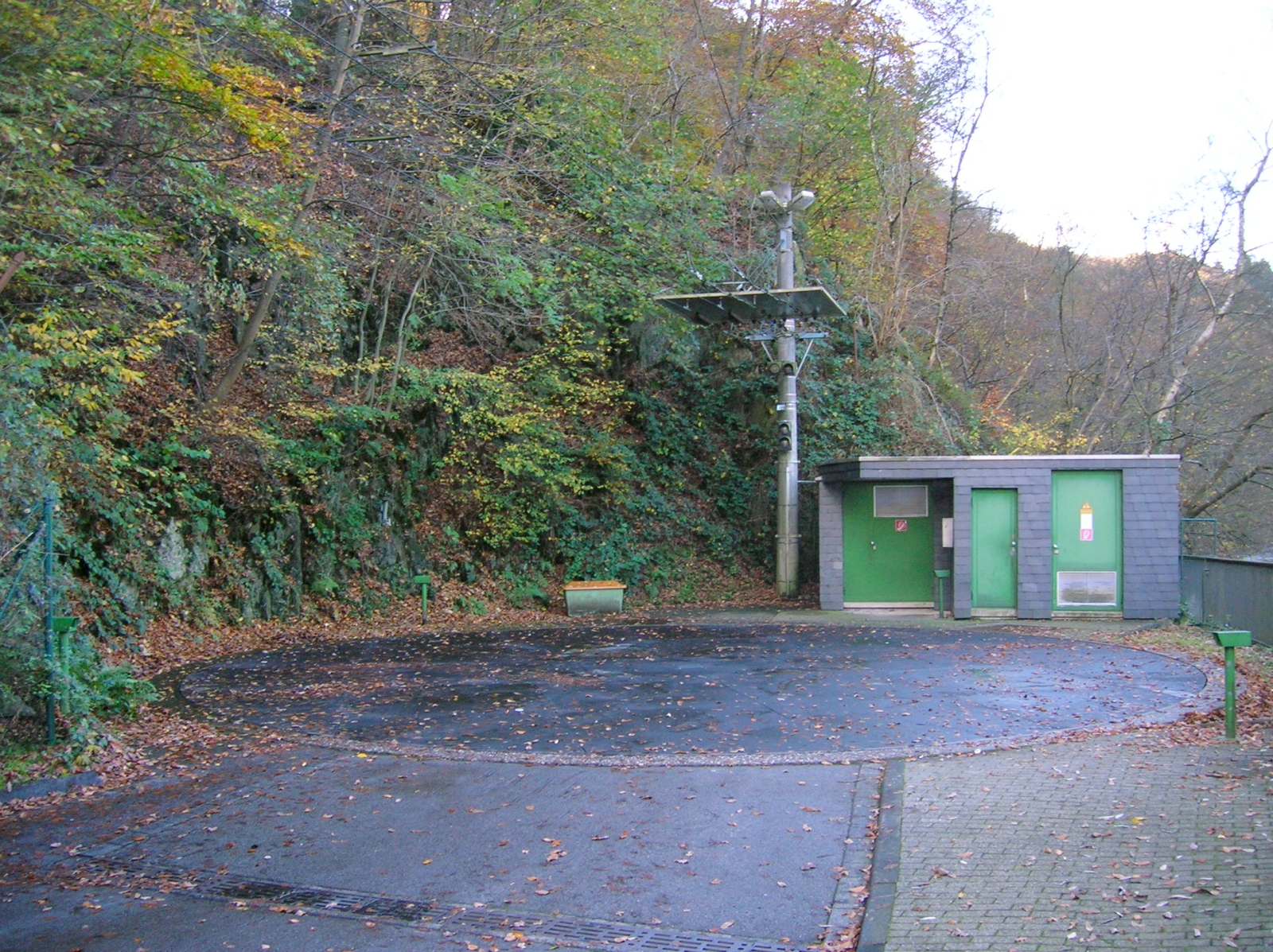
The turntable and the drivehouse in 2005

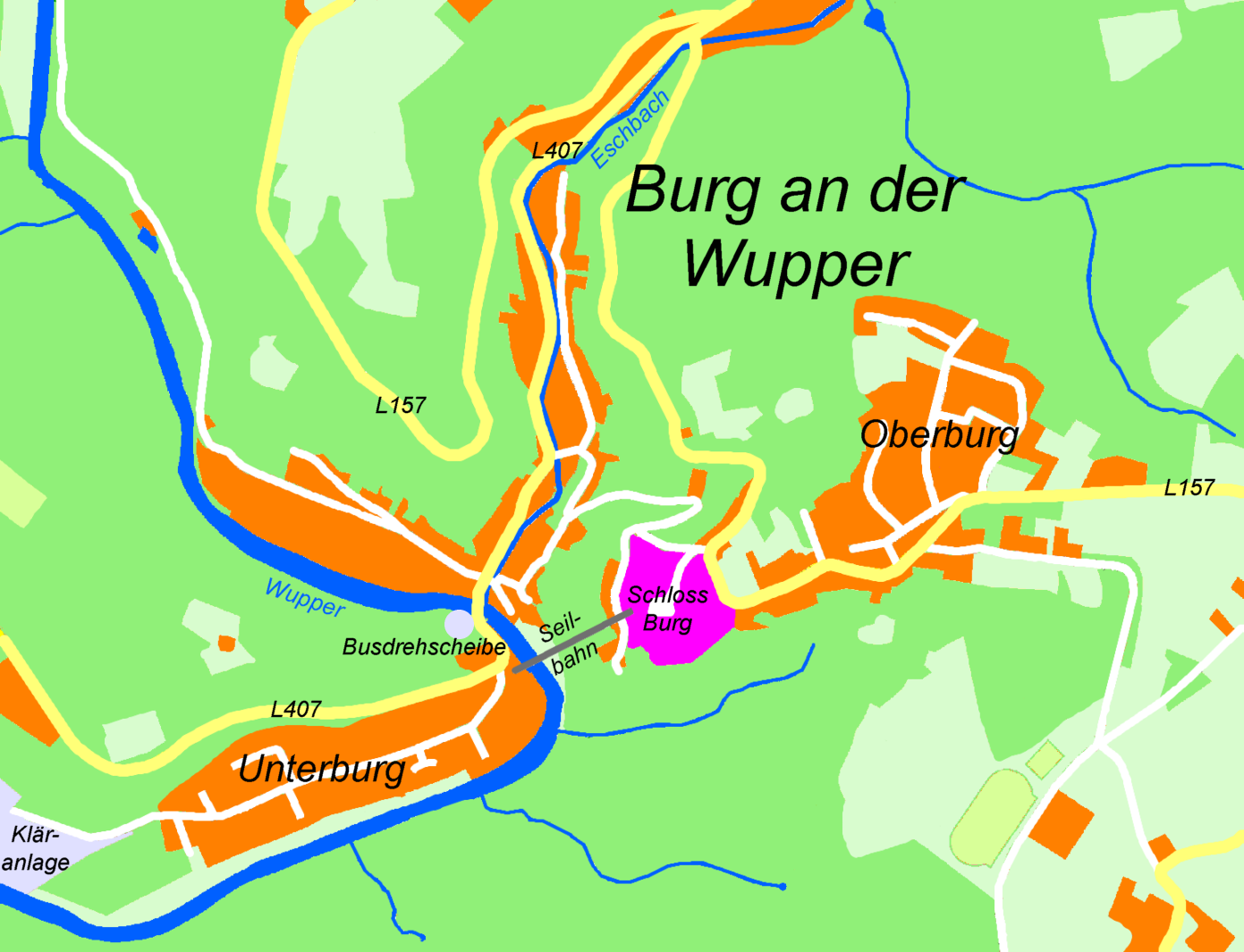
Location of the Unterburg turntable

The Unterburg trolleybus turntable (German: Drehscheibe Unterburg) is a disused turntable for trolleybuses of the Solingen trolleybus system, in the Solingen district Burg an der Wupper, Germany. The facility was regularly used by trolleybus line 683, operated by the Stadtwerke Solingen (SWS), until 15 November 2009, but is preserved in working condition.

The turntable is the last of only four turntables of this type in the world. Two more were located in Great Britain: the Christchurch trolleybus turntable (1936 to 1969) and the Longwood trolleybus turntable at Huddersfield (1939 to 1940). The fourth trolleybus turntable, in Guadalajara, Mexico, was in use from 1982 to 1983 and from 1985 to 1988.

== Description ==
The turning process lasts 45 seconds and is always carried out without passengers on board. The turntable is remotely operated by the driver from an adjoining control house. The trolley poles are lowered manually before starting the rotation and are raised back to the trolley wires afterwards, with the aid of so-called "threading tufts".

== History ==
Until 1959, the independent municipality of Burg an der Wupper was connected to the neighbouring cities of Solingen and Remscheid by tram lines 3 and 4. A separate bridge over the Wupper connected the two tram lines. That was destroyed in World War II and not rebuilt. Instead, a stub-end terminal was placed on the Solingen side. The tram system was shut down in 1959 and replaced by a trolleybus line.

The narrow valley of the Wupper did not leave enough space for a turning loop on the 40-metre (130 ft)-long, but only 8-metre (26 ft)-wide transfer stop on the tramway. The confined area between the river and a steep slope proved particularly problematic. Therefore, as with the two above-mentioned turntables in the UK, a circular disc-type turntable, with a diameter of 7.5 metres (25 ft), was installed to turn trolleybuses on line 3. That was sufficient for the ÜHIIIs trolley type, which was exclusively used at that time. Originally, the mechanism was manually operated by the driver by means of a hand crank.

Introduced in 1968, the new 12-metre (39 ft)-long vehicles of the three-axle Trolleybus Solingen (TS) type could not be used on line 3, which was why only the long-outdated ÜHIIIs vehicles were used until 27 December 1974, after which the turntable had an extension attached so it could also be used by the TS models. In 1985, the turntable was completely renewed, being extended to 12 metres (39 ft) in diameter.

Because of the limited size of the Unterburg turntable, line 683 was the only trolley line in the Solingen network on which no articulated buses could be used. Line 683 was therefore the last line on which the MAN SL 172 HO rigid buses were used. Enlargement of the turntable would have presented technical and financial difficulties.

In the middle of November 2009, line 683 was completely converted to use modern Swisstrolley articulated vehicles manufactured by Carrosserie Hess. They have a diesel-powered auxiliary drive with which they operate to and from the Seilbahn Burg ropeway terminal. There, a new bus station was built for line 683 and other bus lines. The former "Burgbrücke" stop, which was located in the short cul-de-sac between Solingerstraße and the turntable, was moved to the other side of the Wupper river.

=== Future ===
The Unterburg turntable, which is no longer needed, is to be permanently preserved for special journeys of the Trolleybus Museum. It also benefits from the fact that it was only renovated in the middle of 2004 and thus has a lifespan of ten to fifteen years. However, according to SWSA, a final decision on the future of the world's only remaining trolleybus turntable has not yet been made.

== Gallery ==
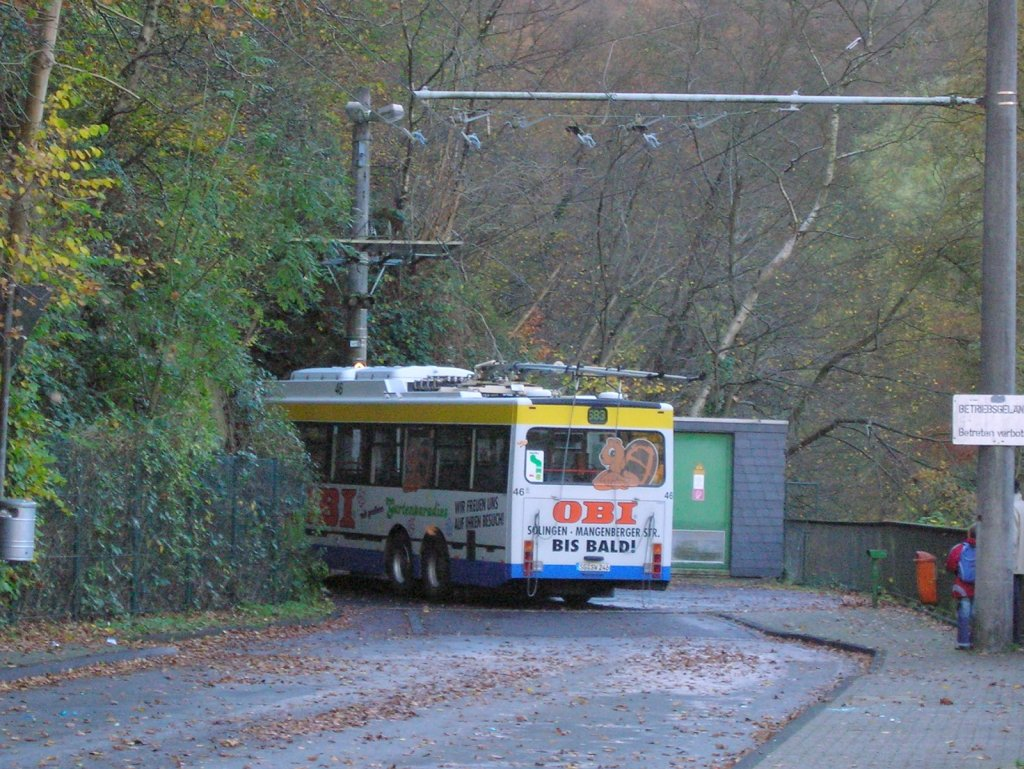
The trolley poles are taken down once the trolley is on the turntable

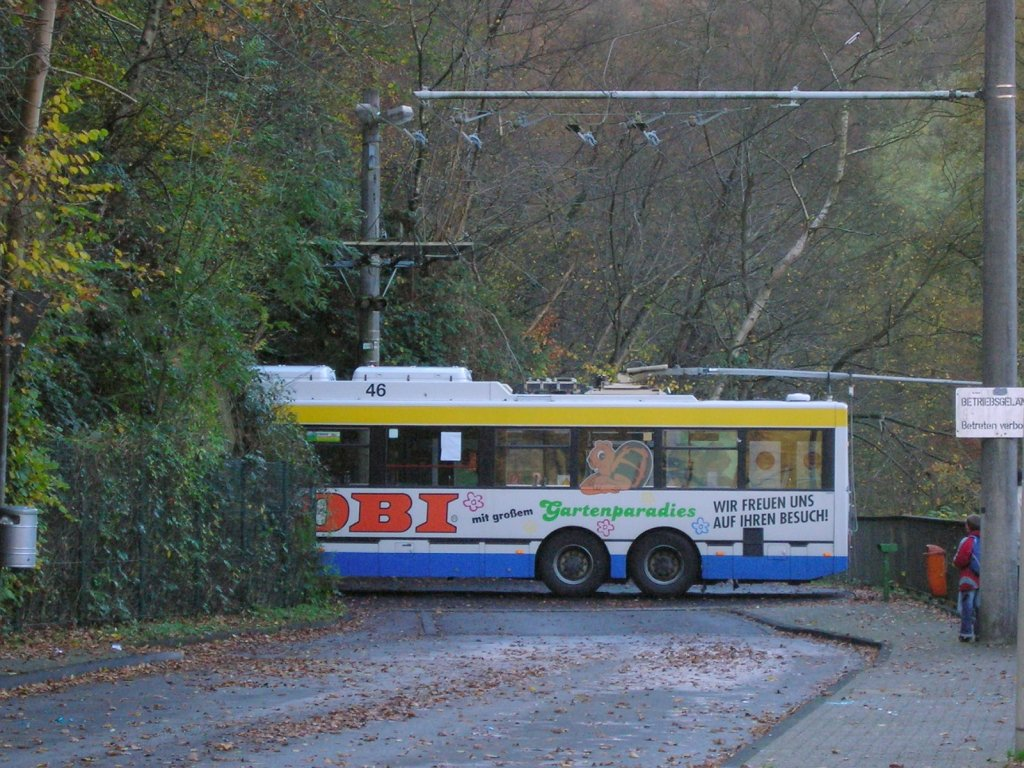
With the driver out of the vehicle, the turning process begins

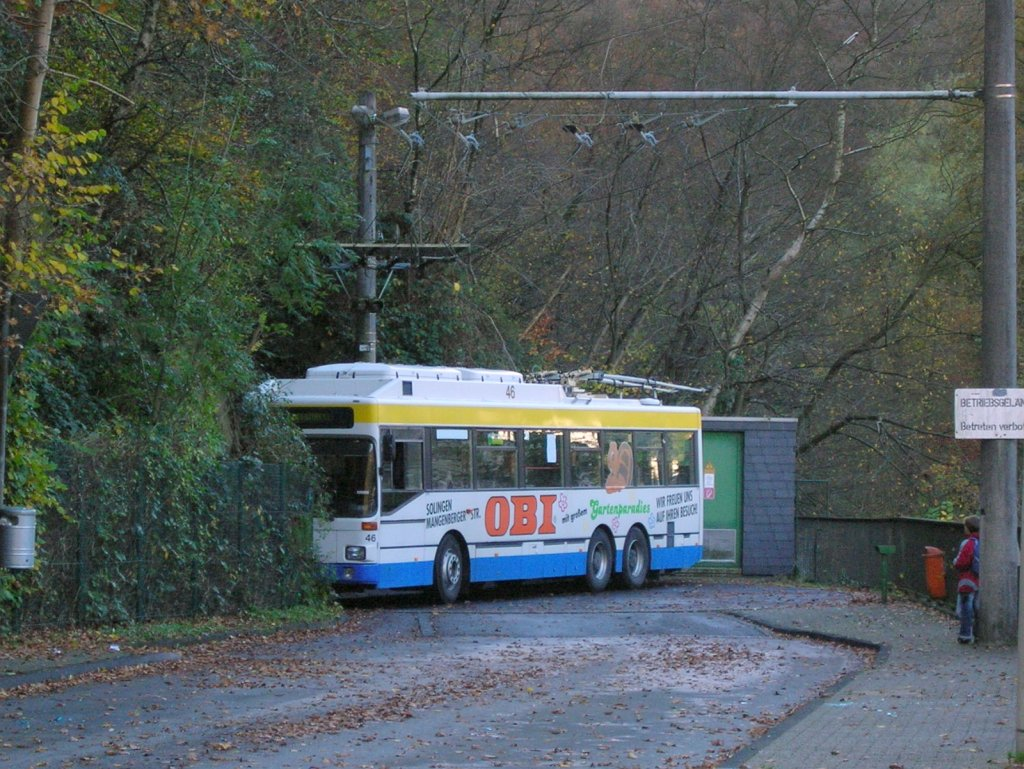
The turning continues until the bus faces the opposite direction

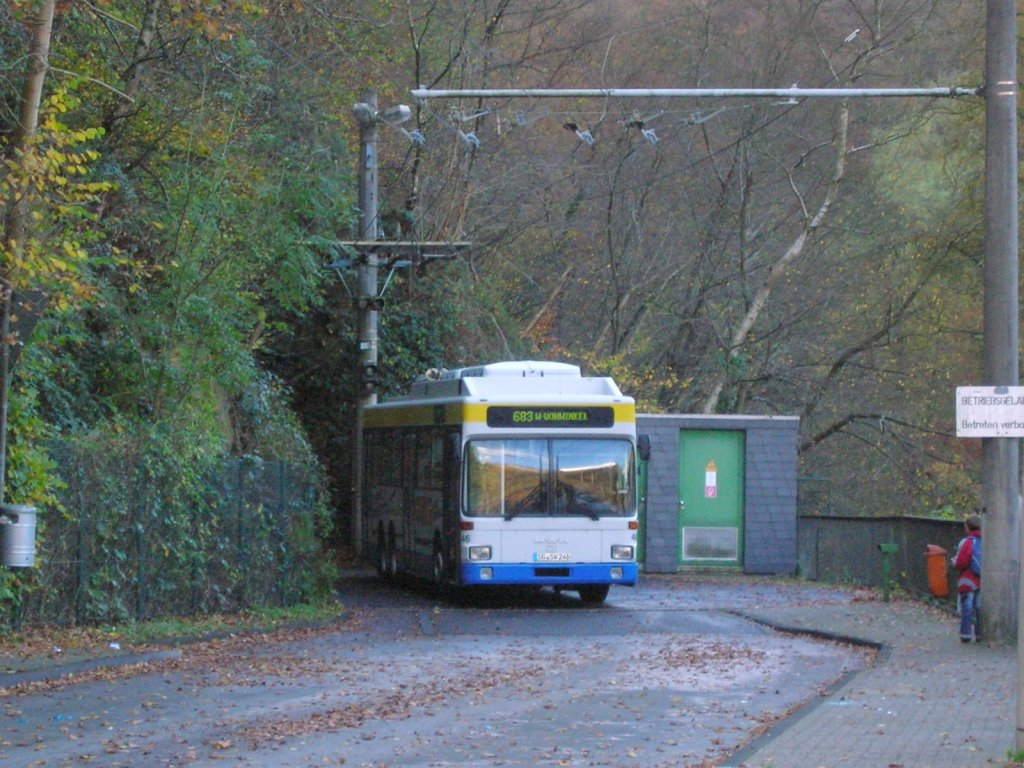
Once the turning is finished, the trolley poles are raised back to the wires
