= MASA (company) =

Former Mexican bus manufacturer

Mexicana de Autobuses, S.A. de C.V. (MASA)
- Type: Public limited company, S.A.
- Founded: 1959
- Defunct: 1998
- Fate: Acquired by Volvo
- Successor: Volvo Buses de México, S.A.
- Headquarters: Tultitlán, Mexico
- Products: Buses, trolleybuses, highway coaches

Mexicana de Autobuses, S.A., or MASA, was a major bus and coach manufacturer located in Mexico. Formed in 1959, it was owned by the Mexican government until being privatized in 1988. It was the country's second-largest bus manufacturer when it was acquired by Volvo, in 1998, and renamed Volvo Buses de México, S.A.

== History ==
MASA was created when the Mexican state-owned investment bank, SOMEX (Sociedad Mexicana de Crédito Industrial), acquired the private company, Sheppard Hnos. (Sheppard Brothers), on 10 September 1959. In 1972 the company built a new factory in Tultitlán, and this facility was expanded in 1980. Somex continued to be a major shareholder in the company, and buses built by MASA often carried "Somex" nameplates on the front.

The government sold the company to private investors on 17 October 1988, but the original buyer defaulted on its debt payments. The company had already ceased production before then, and was reported by some transport media to have "gone out of business" during 1988, but it was resold in November 1989 to an industrial group and in 1993 underwent a restructuring. Production continued during this period, as evidenced by the delivery of 30 new MASA trolleybuses to Mexico City's STE in 1991.

Volvo Buses acquired MASA for US$74 million in September 1998, renaming it Volvo Buses de México and continuing production in the same factory, the then 153,000 sq ft (14,200 m^{2}) plant in Tultitlán. In addition to the purchase amount, Volvo indicated that it planned to invest an additional $80 million in MASA, over a two-year period, to modify the Tultitlán facility and add automobile production (starting in 1999), giving it access to this North American Free Trade Agreement region. At the time of its acquisition by Volvo, MASA's owners were Mexican bus manufacturer DINA S.A., Brazilian bus-body maker Carrocerias Nielson (Busscar) and individuals on MASA's board of directors.

== Products ==
The company manufactured motorbuses for city and suburban use, trolleybuses, and intercity buses (i.e., coaches).

=== Trolleybuses ===
MASA was the major supplier of new trolleybuses to the country's only two trolleybus system operators, building more than 700 for the Mexico City trolleybus system, operated by Servicio de Transportes Eléctricos del D. F. (STE), and 100 for the Guadalajara trolleybus system, then operated by Sistecozome. Trolleybus production began after the company partnered in 1978 with Toshiba, for the latter to supply the electrical propulsion systems for the vehicles. The first MASA/Toshiba trolleybus, a prototype for STE, was completed in 1979. Trolleybuses built after 1987 were fitted with electrical equipment from other suppliers, including Melco/Mitsubishi and Kiepe.

In 1985 MASA constructed an articulated trolleybus for STE, which that transit agency compared with another prototype articulated trolleybus, one built for STE by Moyada (Motores y Adaptaciones Automotrices, S.A.) from two existing MASA two-axle trolleybuses; MASA's prototype was an all-new vehicle. After evaluating these two prototypes, STE decided to contract with MASA to fabricate 67 articulated trolleybuses, using the rear halves of 67 existing two-axle trolleybuses in STE's fleet and combining them with new forward body sections to be built by MASA. The assembly was also undertaken by MASA, and these 67 vehicles were delivered to STE in 1986–87. Apart from these 68 articulated vehicles, all other MASA trolleybuses were two-axle vehicles. However, the company also built articulated diesel buses, of which the production quantities are not known.

MASA's last order for trolleybuses was one received from STE in December 1996, for 200 12-metre (39 ft) trolleybuses. At least 50 of these were delivered in 1997, but delays in STE's obtaining funding resulted in the final 75 not being built—or at least not delivered—until 1999, after the company had been sold.

== Gallery ==
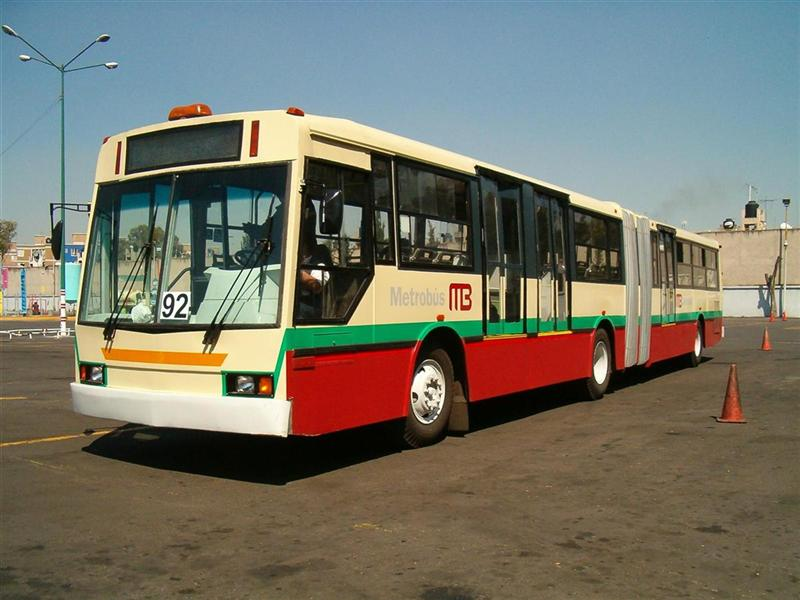
MASA U18 articulated bus in Mexico City

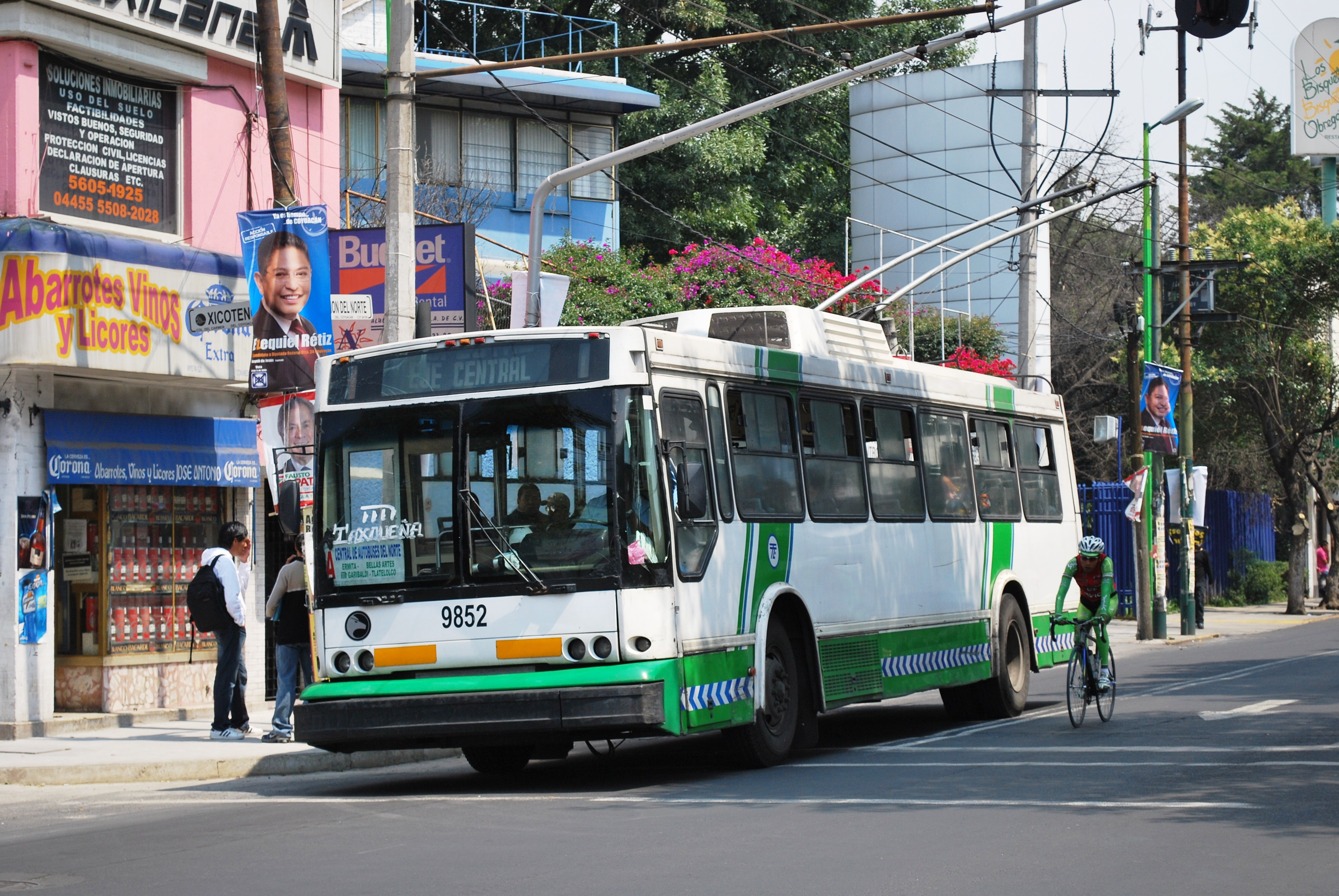
Trolleybus on Division del Norte Street, southbound on STE's Eje Central route, in Mexico City

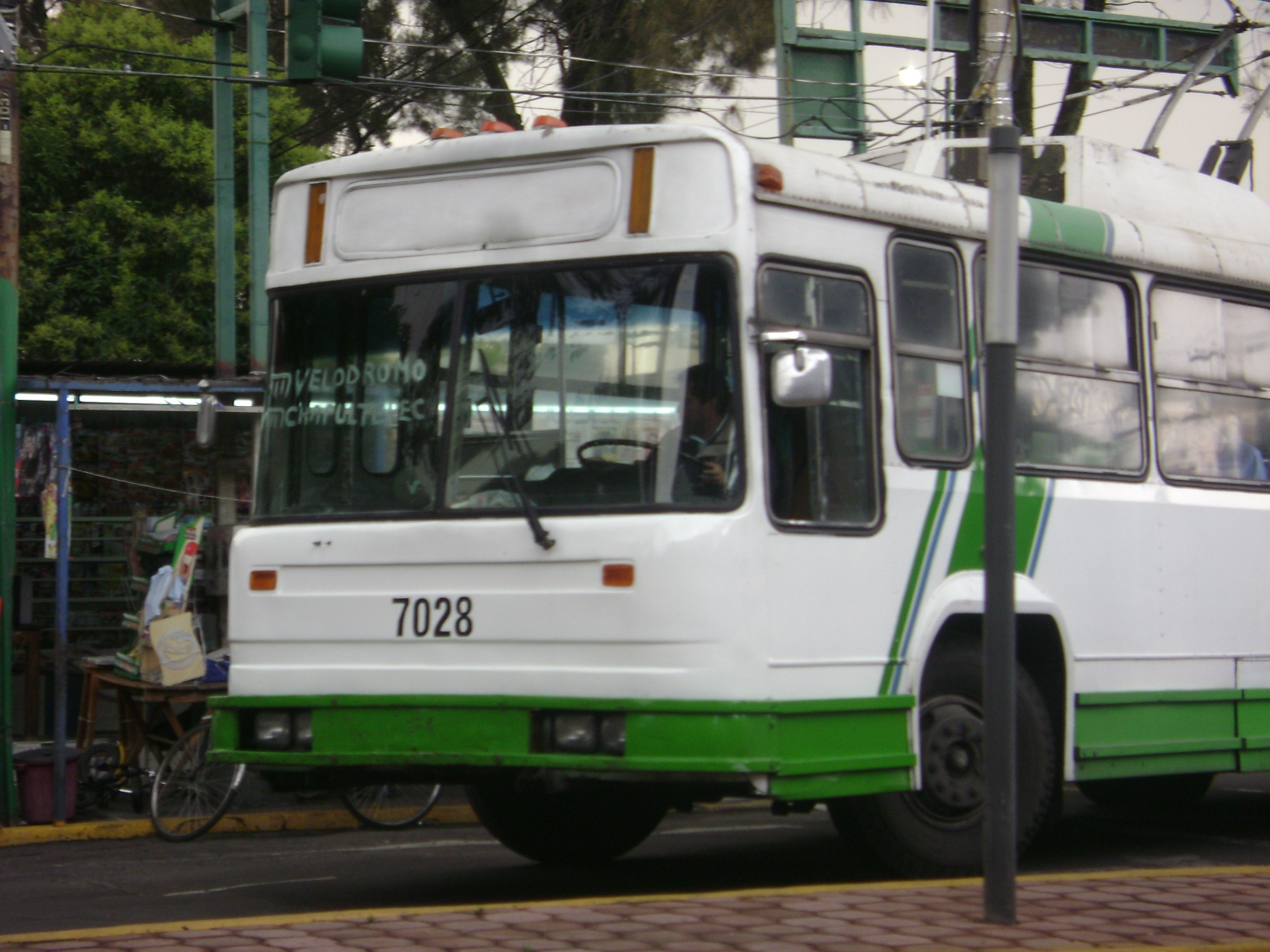
A 1991 MASA-Kiepe trolleybus in Mexico City

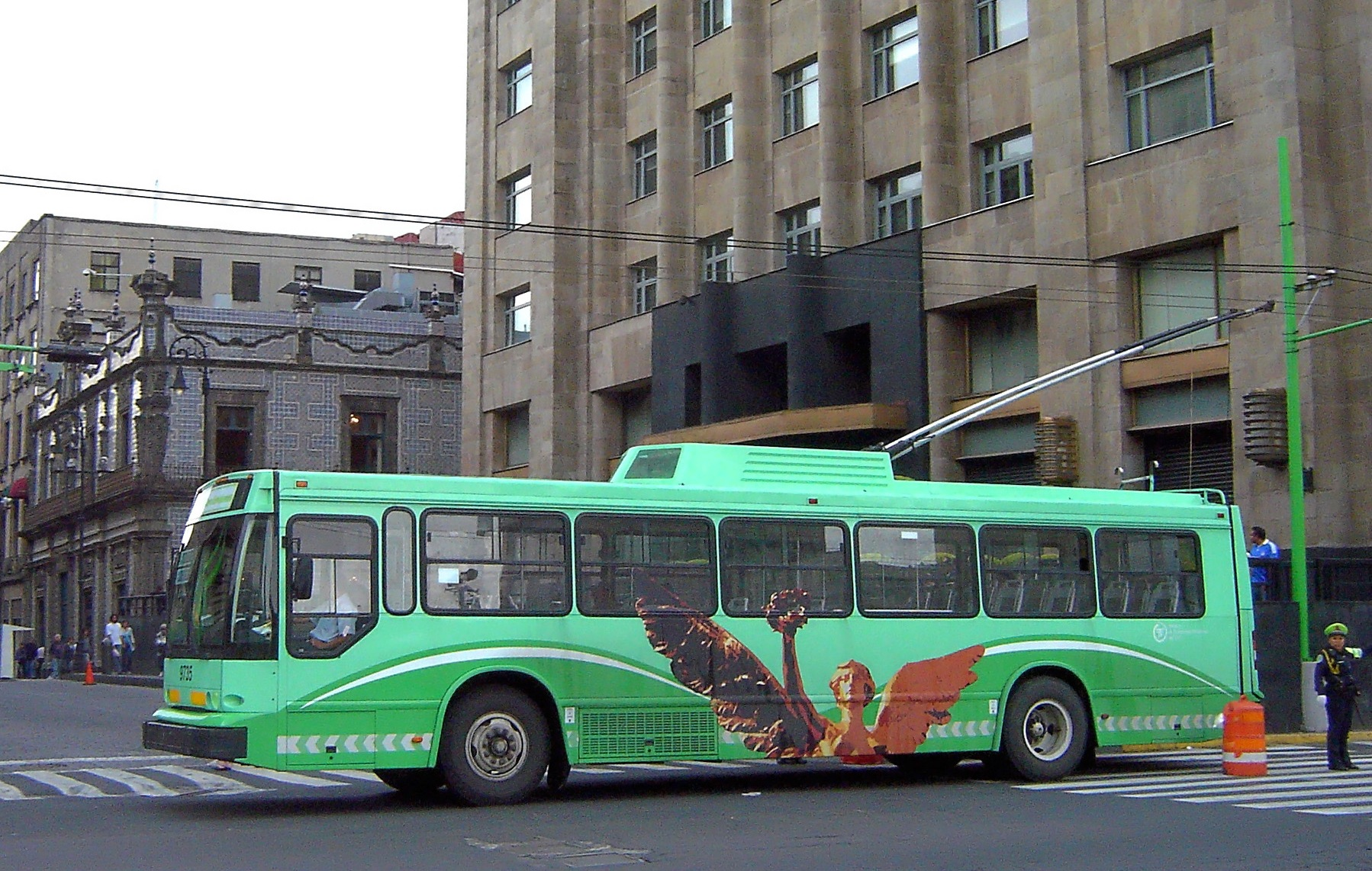
A 1997-built MASA trolleybus on Mexico City's "Zero-Emissions Corridor" line, along Eje Central, operated by STE

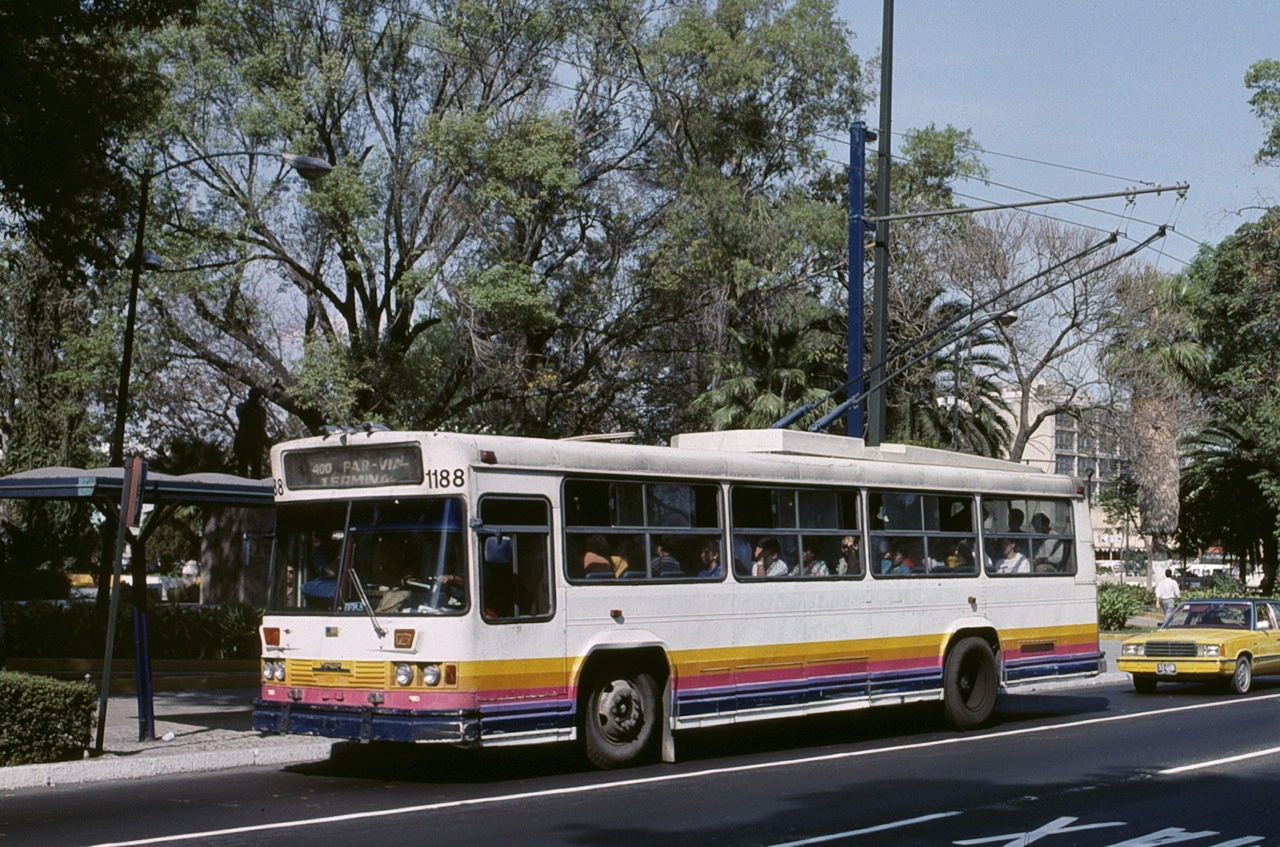
A MASA/Toshiba trolleybus in Guadalajara

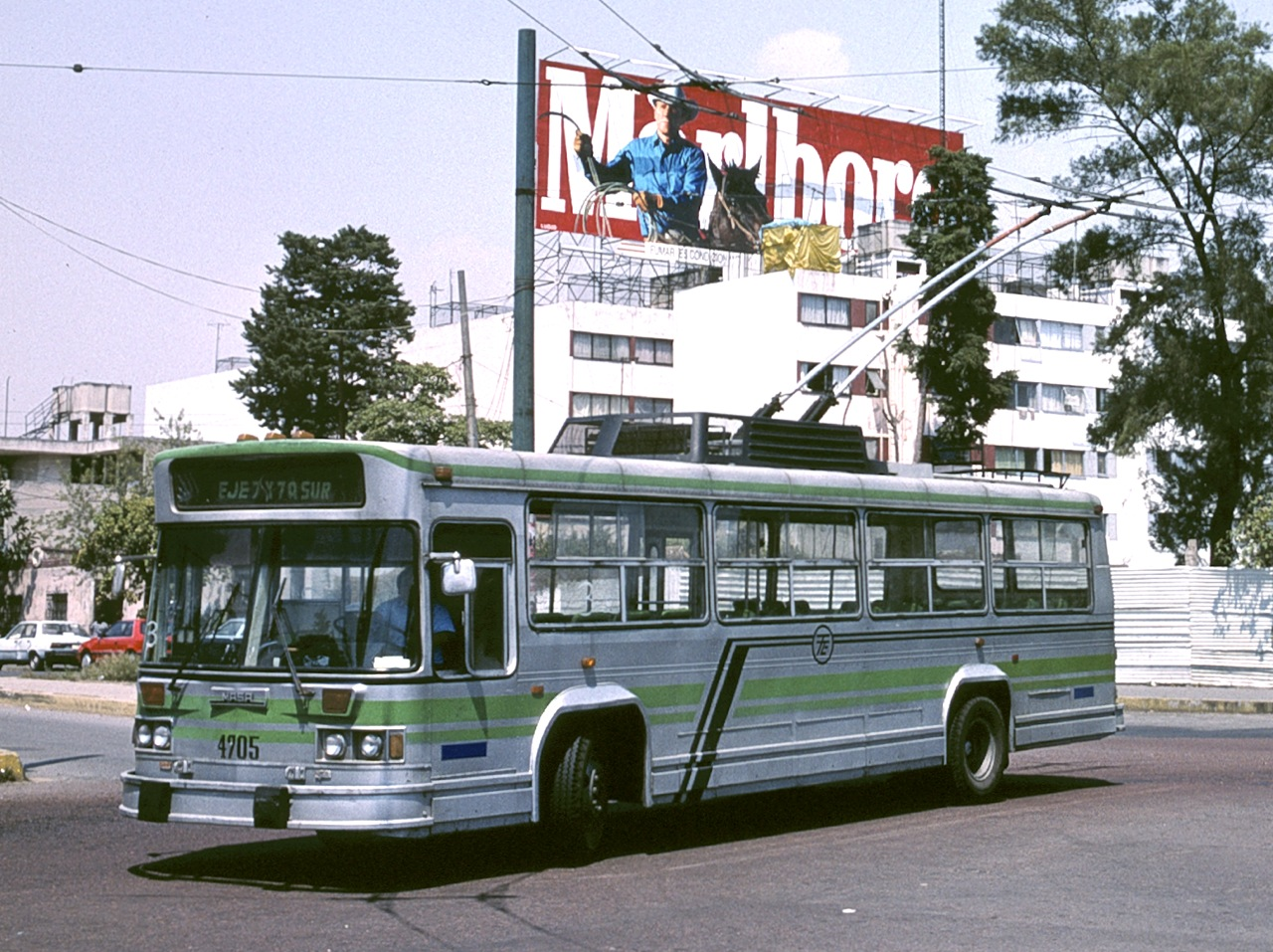
A 1988 MASA trolleybus in Mexico City

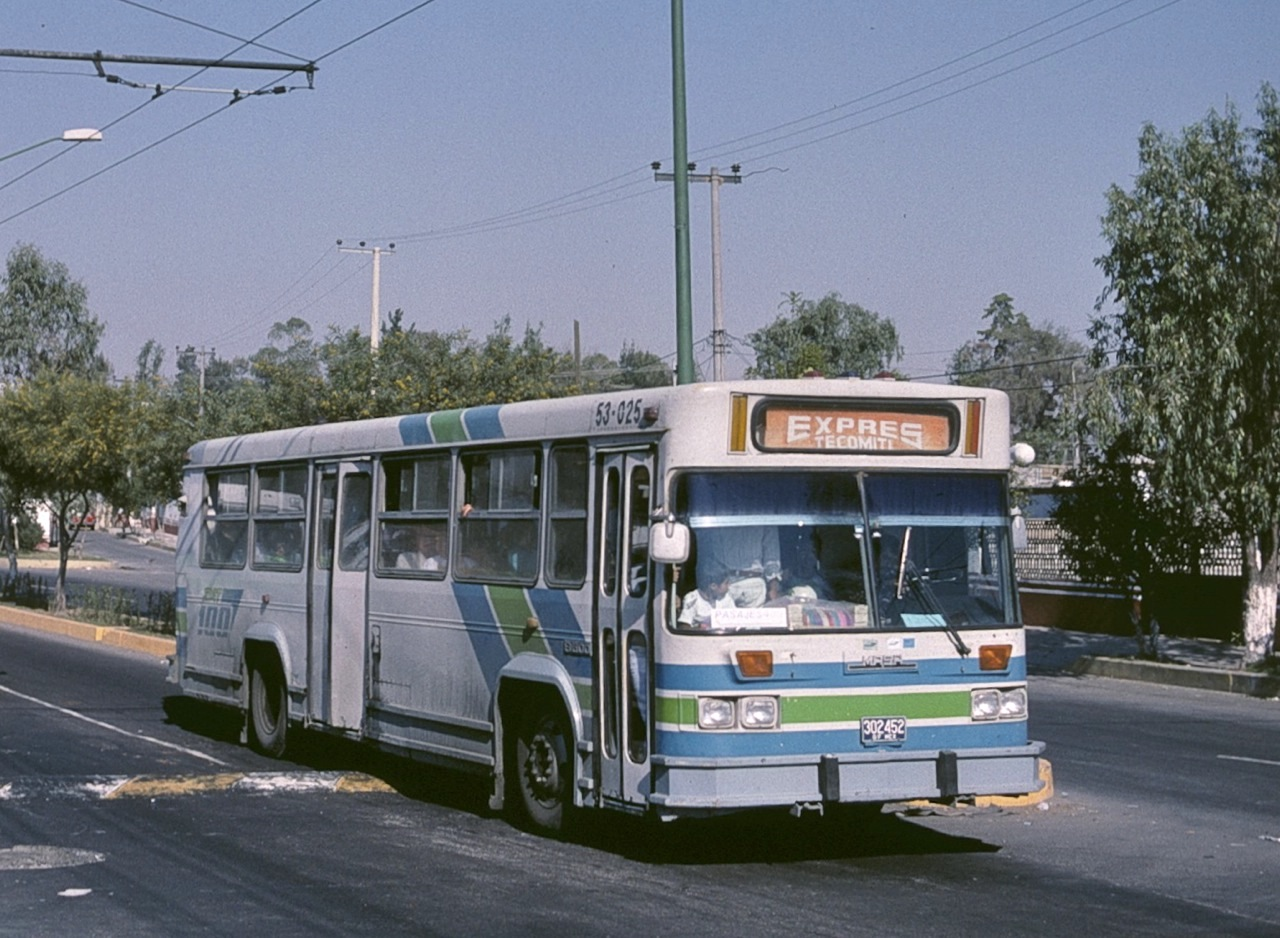
A MASA diesel bus in Mexico City

== See also ==
- DINA S.A.
