= List of trolleybus systems in Germany =

This is a list of trolleybus systems in Germany by federal states (Bundesländer). It includes all trolleybus systems, past and present. A city name in bold indicates a presently existing system.

== Baden-Württemberg ==
Name of System	Location	Date (From)	Date (To)	Notes
	Baden-Baden	26 June 1949	31 July 1971	
	**Esslingen am Neckar**	1 April 1944		See also Trolleybuses in Esslingen am Neckar.
Gleislose Bahn Heilbronn–Böckingen	Heilbronn am Neckar	16 January 1911	1916	See also Gleislose Bahn Heilbronn–Böckingen (in German) for the old system
Gleislose Bahn Heilbronn–Böckingen	Heilbronn am Neckar	23 September 1951	30 December 1960	See also Gleislose Bahn Heilbronn–Böckingen (in German) for the old system
Ludwigsburger Oberleitungs-Bahnen	Ludwigsburg	21 December 1910	1 May 1923	See also Ludwigsburger Oberleitungs-Bahnen (in German)
	Mannheim	1930	1931	
	Pforzheim	29 September 1951	1 October 1969	
	Ulm	14 May 1947	23 October 1963	

== Bavaria ==
Name of System	Location	Date (From)	Date (To)	Notes
	Augsburg	28 October 1943	17 March 1957	
	Landshut	27 November 1948	22 May 1966	
	München /Munich	28 April 1948	28 April 1966	
	Nürnberg /Nuremberg	15 November 1948	12 December 1962	Also a line at the MAN factory, 25 January 1931 – 1935.
	Regensburg	18 March 1953	17 May 1963	

== Berlin and Brandenburg ==
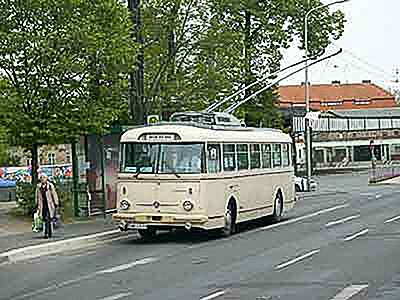
Historic Škoda 9Tr in Eberswalde

Name of System	Location	Date (From)	Date (To)	Notes
	Berlin			
Electromote	♦ Halensee, Charlottenburg – Spandau Bock	29 April 1882	13 June 1882	Electromote, world's first trolleybus operation.
Gleislose Bahn Niederschöneweide–Johannisthal	♦ Schöneweide – Johannisthal	5 December 1904	4 January 1905	See also Gleislose Bahn Niederschöneweide–Johannisthal (in German).
Oberleitungsbus Steglitz	♦ Steglitz	20 April 1912	31 July 1914	See also Oberleitungsbus Steglitz (in German)
	♦ Spandau, West Berlin	24 December 1933	17 December 1952	
	♦ Steglitz, West Berlin	2 May 1935	22 March 1965	
	♦ Mitte – Lichtenberg, East Berlin	1 August 1951	1 February 1973	
Gleislose Bahn Eberswalde	**Eberswalde**	22 March 1901	June 1901	See also Trolleybuses in Eberswalde, see also Gleislose Bahn Eberswalde (in German) for the old system
Gleislose Bahn Eberswalde	**Eberswalde**	3 November 1940		See also Trolleybuses in Eberswalde, see also Gleislose Bahn Eberswalde (in German) for the old system
	Potsdam	1 October 1949	2 February 1995	

== Bremen ==
Name of System	Location	Date (From)	Date (To)	Notes
Bremen-Arster Gleislose Bahn for the old system	Bremen	7 August 1910	19 June 1916	See also Bremen-Arster Gleislose Bahn (in German), for the old system
Bremen-Arster Gleislose Bahn for the old system	Bremen	1 November 1949	5 November 1961	See also Bremen-Arster Gleislose Bahn (in German), for the old system
	Bremerhaven	20 November 1947	30 June 1958	

== Hamburg ==
Name of System	Location	Date (From)	Date (To)	Notes
Gleislose Bahn Blankenese–Marienhöhe	Hamburg	2 January 1911	1 August 1914	See also Gleislose Bahn Blankenese–Marienhöhe (in German)
	♦ Harburg	12 July 1949	18 January 1958	

== Hesse ==
Name of System	Location	Date (From)	Date (To)	Notes
	Darmstadt	1 March 1944	16 April 1963	
	Frankfurt am Main	6 January 1944	17 October 1959	
	Gießen	18 June 1941	23 December 1968	
	Kassel	12 July 1944	Feb 1945	
	Kassel	1 October 1947	27 May 1962	
	Marburg	19 May 1951	5 October 1968	
	Offenbach am Main	14 July 1951	26 September 1972	
	Wiesbaden	23 December 1948	17 November 1961	

== Lower Saxony ==
Name of System	Location	Date (From)	Date (To)	Notes
	Hannover	6 June 1937	10 May 1958	
	Hildesheim	7 August 1943	30 May 1969	
	Oldenburg	26 September 1936	26 October 1957	
	Osnabrück	2 December 1949	10 June 1968	
	Wilhelmshaven	1 October 1942	30 October 1960	
	♦ Wilhelmshaven – Jever	8 December 1944	30 September 1954	

== North Rhine-Westphalia ==
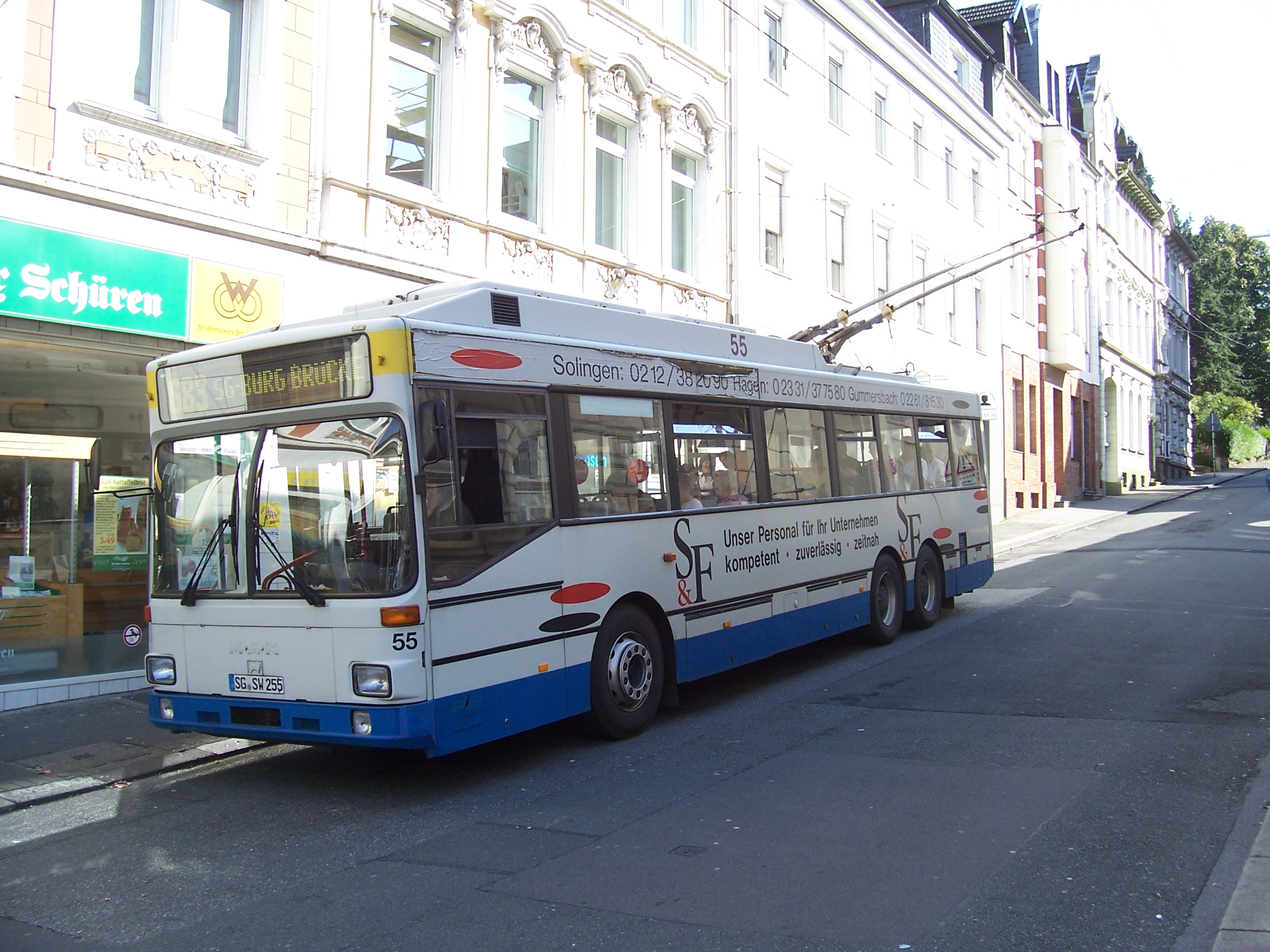
Trolleybus of the Solingen network in Wuppertal-Vohwinkel

Name of System	Location	Date (From)	Date (To)	Notes
	Aachen	2 January 1944	13 September 1944	
	Aachen	1 August 1948	3 February 1974	
	Bielefeld	27 May 1944	8 November 1968	
	Bochum	18 June 1949	18 October 1959	
	Bonn	17 February 1951	30 June 1971	
	Dortmund	29 May 1942	17 June 1967	
	Duisburg	18 December 1954	28 May 1967	
	Essen	8 May 1949	23 November 1959	
	Essen	28 May 1983	24 September 1995	Dual-mode guided bus (Duo-Bus) operation.
	Gummersbach	25 November 1948	30 September 1962	
	Köln /Cologne	6 November 1950	16 March 1959	
	Krefeld	3 December 1949	29 May 1964	
	Langenfeld – Monheim	31 May 1904	5 November 1908	
Veischedetalbahn	Grevenbrück (today: Lennestadt)	6 February 1903	6 June 1916	See also Veischedetalbahn (in German)
	Mettmann	26 August 1930	31 December 1954	
	Minden	19 December 1953	20 July 1965	
	Moers	27 October 1950	19 September 1968	
Gleislose Bahn Monheim–Langenfeld	Monheim am Rhein	31 May 1904	5 November 1908	See also Gleislose Bahn Monheim–Langenfeld (in German)
	Münster	1 October 1949	26 May 1968	
	Neuss	28 August 1948	31 December 1959	
	Neuwied	1 October 1949	28 February 1963	
	Rheydt	18 May 1952	16 June 1973	Rheydt was merged into Mönchengladbach from 1975.
	Siegen	16 October 1941	5 January 1969	
	**Solingen**	19 June 1952		See also Trolleybuses in Solingen.
	Wuppertal	1 October 1949	27 May 1972	One trolleybus line from Solingen terminates in Wuppertal-Vohwinkel

== Rhineland-Palatinate ==
Name of System	Location	Date (From)	Date (To)	Notes
Elektrische gleislose Bahn Ahrweiler	Bad Neuenahr – Ahrweiler	23 May 1906	1919	See also Elektrische gleislose Bahn Ahrweiler (in German)
	Idar-Oberstein	22 February 1932	11 May 1969	
	Kaiserslautern	29 October 1949	30 November 1985	
	Koblenz	17 July 1941	30 October 1970	
	Mainz	19 May 1946	12 February 1967	
	Pirmasens	25 November 1941	12 October 1967	
	Trier	20 January 1940	27 May 1970	

== Saarland ==
Name of System	Location	Date (From)	Date (To)	Notes
	Neunkirchen	1 August 1953	31 March 1964	
	Saarbrücken	12 November 1948	11 May 1964	
	Völklingen	12 November 1950	4 June 1967	

== Saxony ==
Name of System	Location	Date (From)	Date (To)	Notes
Mühlenbahn Großbauchlitz	Döbeln	1 May 1905	1914	See also Mühlenbahn Großbauchlitz (in German), a non-passenger operation only, cargo line
Dresdner Haide-Bahn for the first system	Dresden	24 March 1903	19 March 1904	See also Dresdner Haide-Bahn (in German) for the first system
Dresdner Haide-Bahn for the first system	Dresden	5 November 1947	28 November 1975	See also Dresdner Haide-Bahn (in German) for the first system
	Hoyerswerda	6 October 1989	30 December 1994	
Gleislose Bielathal-Motorbahn mit elektrischer Oberleitung	Königstein – Königsbrunn	10 July 1901	Sep 1904	See also Gleislose Bielathal-Motorbahn mit elektrischer Oberleitung (in German)
	Leipzig	1912	1912	
	Leipzig	29 July 1938	31 May 1975	
	Wurzen	7 April 1905	1929	Non-passenger operation only.
	Zwickau	1 December 1938	30 August 1977	

== Saxony-Anhalt ==
Name of System	Location	Date (From)	Date (To)	Notes
	Bitterfeld	Oct 1984	Oct 1988	Non-passenger (coal mine).
	Elbingerode (Harz)	Mar 1988	Feb 1989	Non-passenger (limestone works).
	Magdeburg	1 July 1951	31 October 1970	

== Schleswig-Holstein ==
Name of System	Location	Date (From)	Date (To)	Notes
	Flensburg	9 October 1943	15 September 1959	
	Kiel	28 May 1944	15 April 1964	

== Thuringia ==
Name of System	Location	Date (From)	Date (To)	Notes
	Erfurt	26 February 1948	7 November 1975	
	Gera	2 November 1939	14 September 1977	
	Greiz	21 September 1945	11 July 1969	
	Weimar	2 February 1948	2 April 1993	

Towns in historic East Prussia, West Prussia, Lower Silesia and Brandenburg that are no longer part of Germany:

- Allenstein: see Olsztyn, Poland
- Breslau: see Wrocław, Poland
- Danzig: see Gdańsk, Poland
- Insterburg: see Chernyakhovsk, Russia
- Landsberg an der Warthe: see Gorzów Wielkopolski, Poland
- Liegnitz: see Legnica, Poland
- Waldenburg: see Wałbrzych, Poland

== See also ==
- List of trolleybus systems, for all other countries
- Trolleybus
- (in German) Oberleitungsbus
- Trolleybus usage by country
- List of town tramway systems in Germany
- List of light-rail transit systems
- List of rapid transit systems

== Sources ==
=== Books and periodicals ===
- Alan G. Murray (2000). World Trolleybus Encyclopaedia. ISBN 978-0-904235-18-0.
- Werner Stock (1987). Obus-Anlagen in Deutschland: die Entwicklung der Oberleitungs-Omnibus-Betriebe im Deutschen Reich, in der Bundesrepublik Deutschland und in der Deutschen Demokratischen Republik seit 1930. ISBN 978-3-926882-00-4.
- Robert Peschkes (1993). World Gazetteer of Tram, Trolleybus, and Rapid Transit Systems, Part 3: Europe. ISBN 978-0-948619-01-4.
- Trolleybus Magazine (ISSN 0266-7452). National Trolleybus Association (UK). Bimonthly.
- Blickpunkt Strassenbahn. Arbeitsgemeinschaft Blickpunkt Strassenbahn e.V. (Germany). Bimonthly.
