= Trolleybuses in Bournemouth =

Bournemouth trolleybus system

Bournemouth trolleybus system
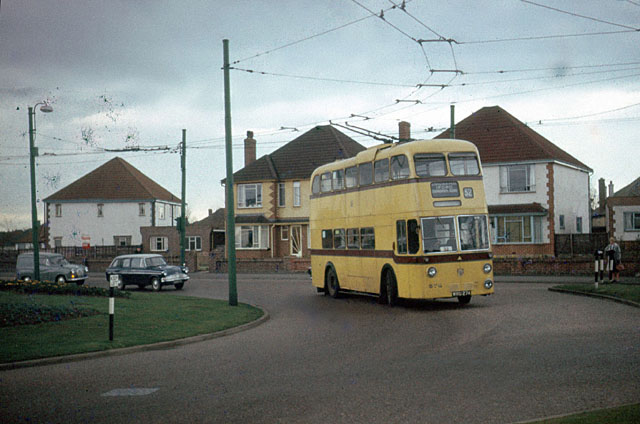
- A Bournemouth trolleybus at the Iford roundabout, March 1966

Operation
- Locale: Bournemouth, Hampshire (now Dorset), England
- Open: 13 May 1933
- Close: 20 April 1969
- Status: Closed
- Routes: 22
- Operator: Bournemouth Corporation Transport

Infrastructure
- Stock: 104 (maximum)

The Bournemouth trolleybus system once served the town of Bournemouth, then in Hampshire, but now in Dorset, England. Opened on 13 May 1933, it gradually replaced the Bournemouth tramway network.

By the standards of the various now-defunct trolleybus systems in the United Kingdom, the Bournemouth system was a medium-sized one, with a total of 22 routes, and a maximum fleet of 104 trolleybuses. It was also the second largest trolleybus system in southern England, after the London system. It was closed on 20 April 1969.

== Notable features ==
The most notable feature of the Bournemouth system was probably the Christchurch trolleybus turntable, which is said to be one of only five such turntables ever to have been constructed worldwide. It is now a Grade II listed building. The turntable was manually operated and was in use from 19 June 1936 until the closure of the system.

Also notable was the style of bodywork employed on most of the Bournemouth's trolleybuses. Many featured two staircases and the traditional open rear platform was supplemented with a front passenger exit fitted with folding doors.

== Preservation ==
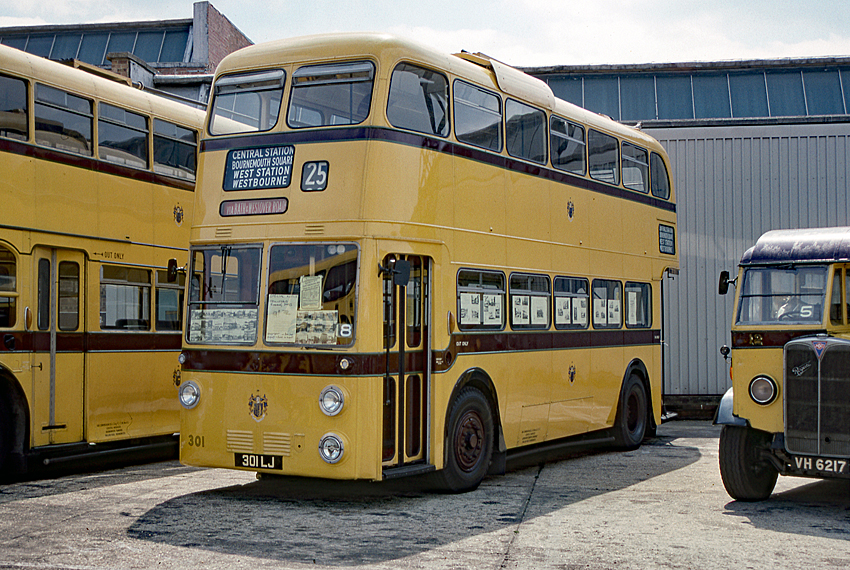
Bournemouth trolleybus 301 at Mallard Road depot open day

Several of the former Bournemouth system trolleybuses are now preserved, in their distinctive yellow and maroon livery. Two are at the East Anglia Transport Museum (fleet numbers 282 and 286), and two Sunbeam MF2B trolleybuses plus one other (fleet numbers 99, 297 and 301) are at The Trolleybus Museum at Sandtoft. One is in private ownership in England and another is in the National Transport Museum of Ireland.

== See also ==
- History of Bournemouth
- Transport in Bournemouth
- List of trolleybus systems in the United Kingdom
