= Trolleybuses in Esslingen am Neckar =

Public transit system in Baden-Württemberg, Germany

Coordinates: 48°44′N 09°19′E

Esslingen am Neckar trolleybus system
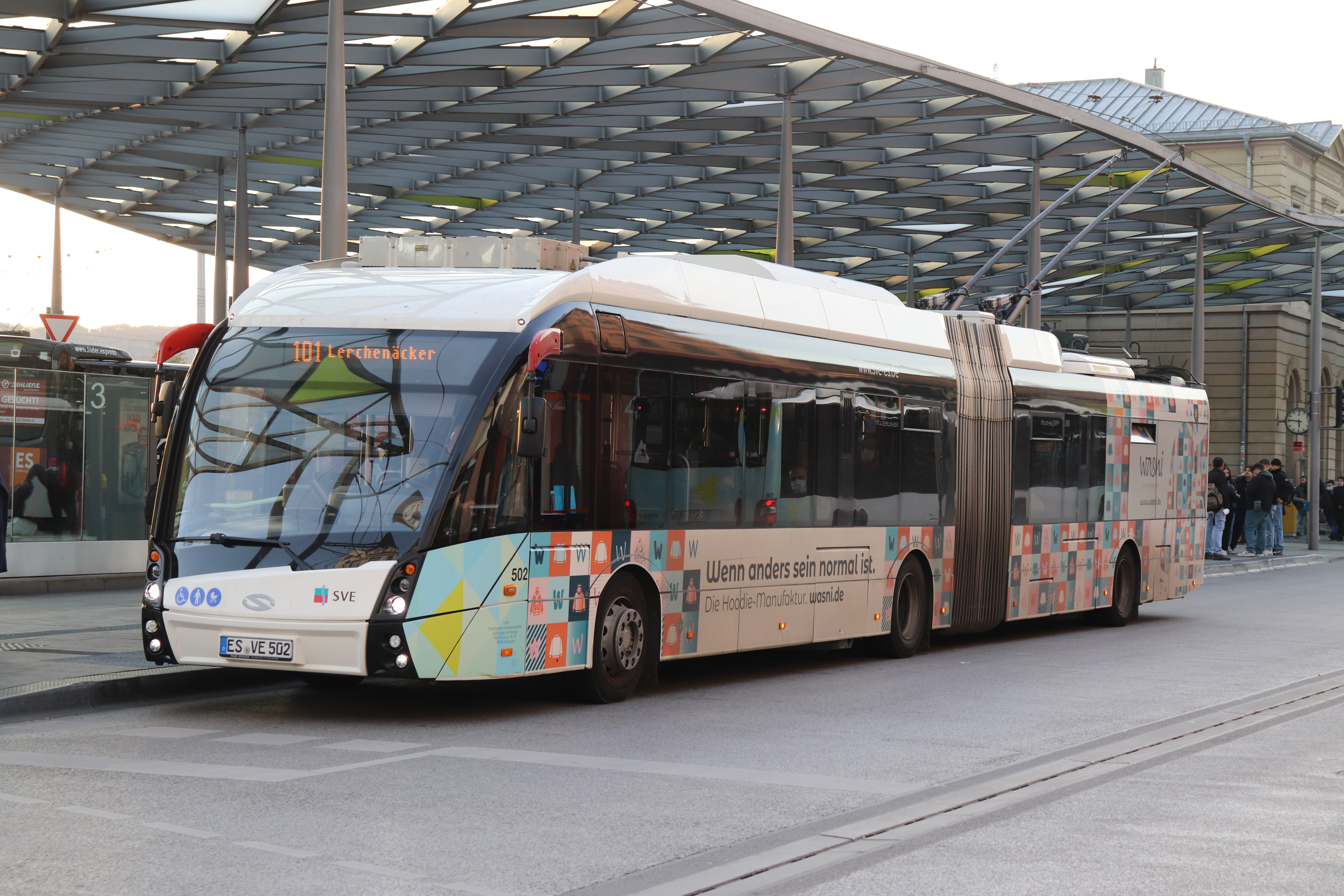
- A Solaris Trollino MetroStyle trolleybus at Esslingen Bahnhof in 2021

Operation
- Locale: Esslingen am Neckar, Germany
- Open: 10 July 1944
- Status: Open
- Routes: 3
- Operator: Städtischer Verkehrsbetrieb Esslingen am Neckar (SVE)

Infrastructure
- Electrification: 600 V DC
- Stock: 10

Statistics
Overview
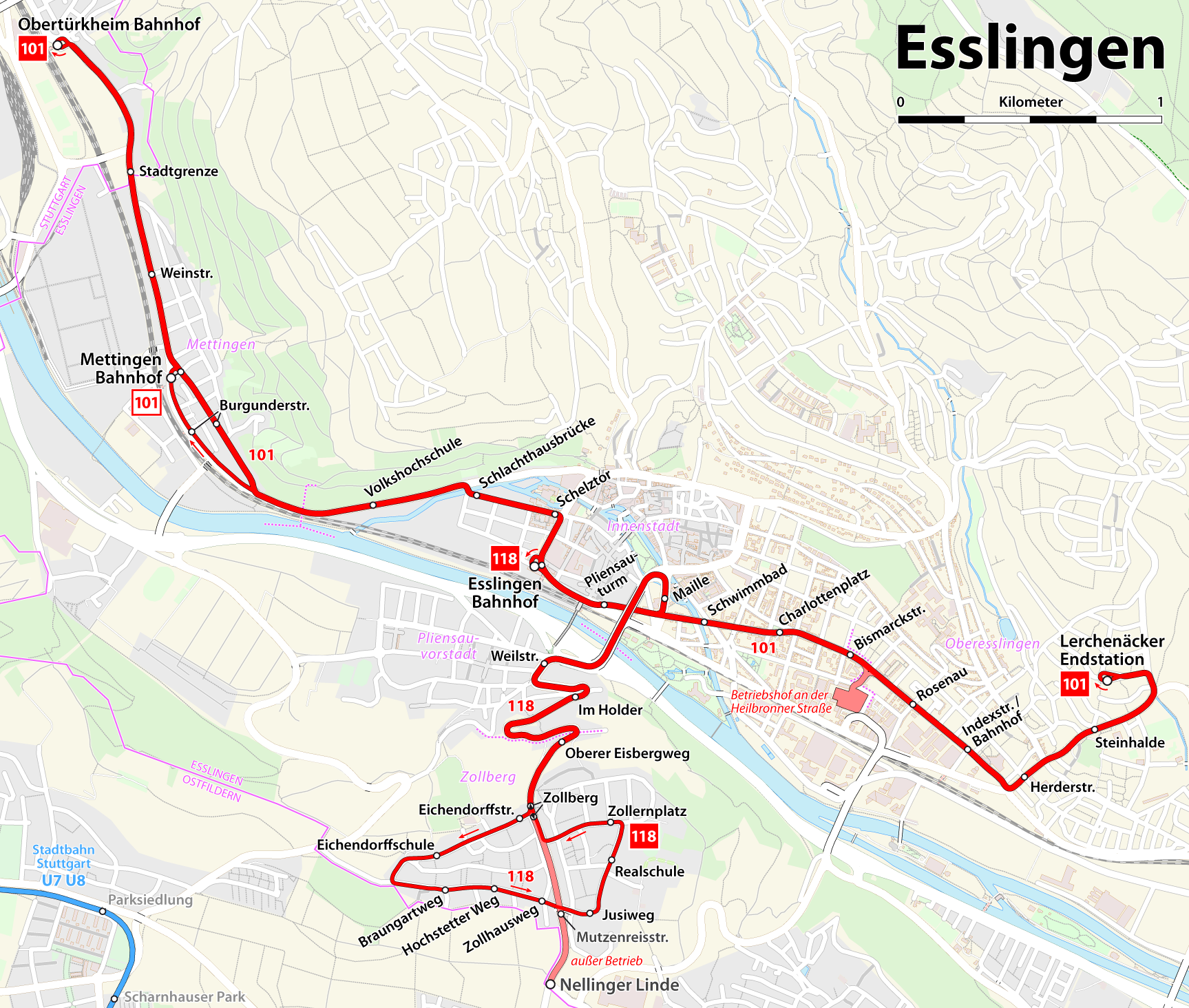
System map, 2010.
- Website: http://www.sve-es.de/ Städtischer Verkehrsbetrieb Esslingen (in German)

The Esslingen am Neckar trolleybus system serves the city of Esslingen am Neckar, in the Land of Baden-Württemberg, Germany.

Opened on 10 July 1944, the system had two routes (101 and 118) and a fleet of nine trolleybuses in 2011. Starting in 2016, trolleybuses equipped with in-motion charging were put into operation on route 113.

== Routes ==
As of 2026, trolleybuses operates on three routes:

- 101 Lerchenäcker – Esslingen Bahnhof – Mettingen – Obertürkheim
- 113 Esslingen Bahnhof – Zollberg – Berkheim
- 118 Esslingen Bahnhof – Zollberg (Zollernplatz)

However, use of trolleybuses on routes 113 and 118 is somewhat intermittent.

== History ==
The trolleybus system opened on 10 July 1944, replacing the Esslingen tram system, which closed on 7 July 1944. The first route, which still exists today, connected Obertürkeim with Oberesslingen. Obertürkheim is located outside the Esslingen town boundary, in Stuttgart, and the northern terminus of the trolleybus route was at Stuttgart-Obertürkheim station, where it met trams of the Stuttgart tram system. The route was originally numbered 31, while supplementary peak-period trips between Esslingen railway station and Oberesslingen were numbered 32. It was originally operated by Stuttgarter Straßenbahnen AG (SSB).

On 1 January 1951, the city of Esslingen took over operation of the system from SSB, and routes 31 and 32 were renumbered 1 and 2. The new operator was Städtischer Verkehrsbetrieb Esslingen am Neckar (SVE). A new turning loop in the overhead wiring was installed in Mettingen, and starting on 27 March 1951 this allowed additional trips coming from central Esslingen to terminate in Mettingen, to serve a Maschinenfabrik Esslingen factory there.

In September 1961, the route was extended by 1.2 km (0.75 mi) in Oberesslingen, to Lerchenäcker. Fares were collected by conductors until 1969.

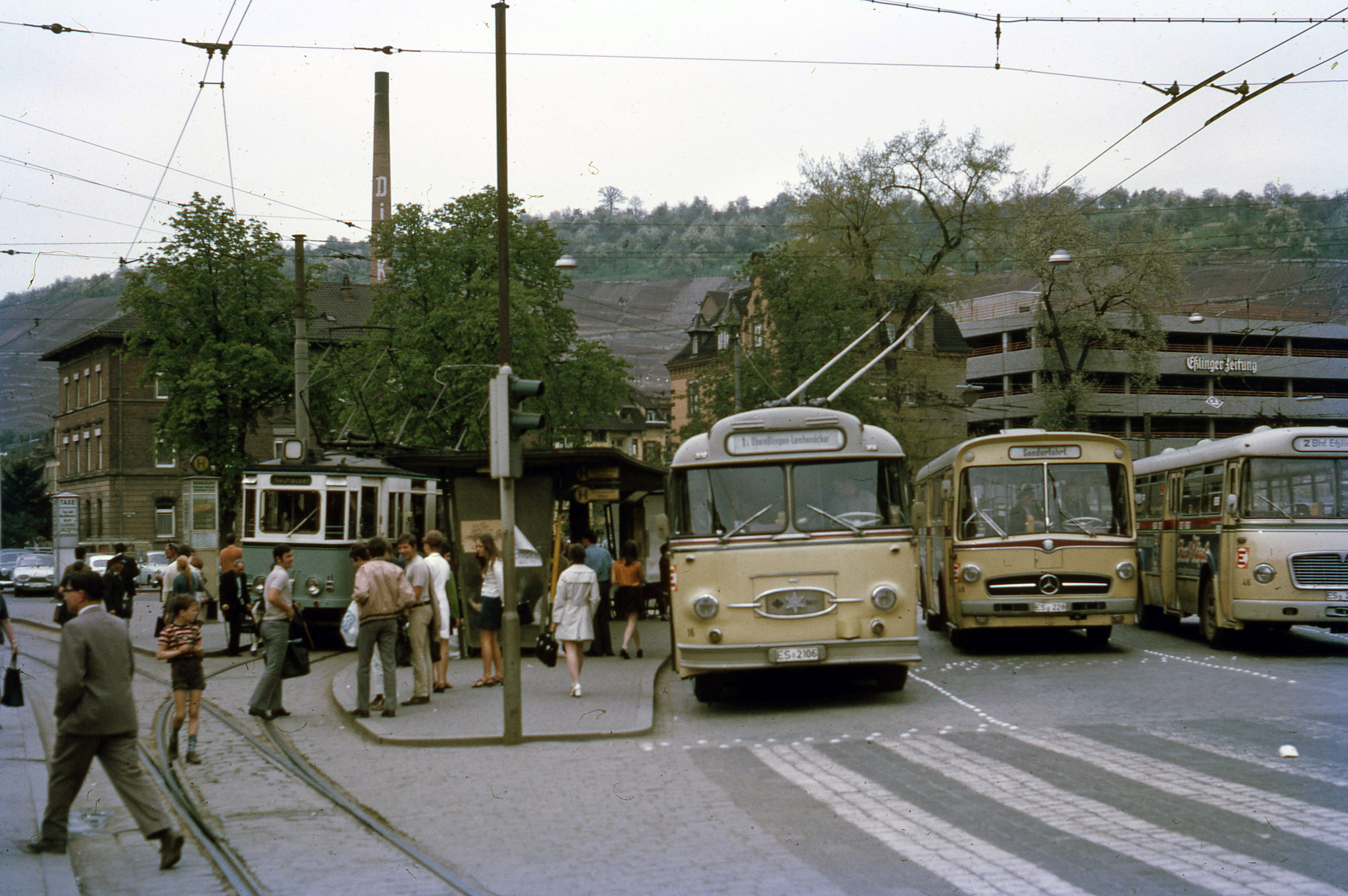
At Esslingen station, trolleybuses connected with trams of the suburban END tramway, until the latter's closure in 1978.

In 1975, SVE began testing a dual-mode bus, a bus capable of operating as either a trolleybus powered from the overhead wires or on battery power, away from the wires. Additional "duobuses", as they were called at the time, joined the fleet later, including the fleet's first articulated trolleybuses. In 1976, the peak-period service 2 was extended north to Mettingen. In the mid-1980s, it was discontinued, and route 1 was renumbered 101.

The interurban Esslingen–Nellingen–Denkendorf Tramway (END), which had connected with the trolleybus route at Esslingen Bahnhof, closed in 1978. SVE proposed building an extension of the trolleybus wires as far as the Zollberg district, to revive electric operation to some of the area formerly served by the END, to be operated by dual-mode buses and include some sections without overhead wires. By 1980, this plan had been scrapped, but it was later revived. Between 1983 and 1995, 22 dual-mode trolleybuses were acquired.

In March 1987, the direction of the turning loop at Obertürkheim was reversed, from counterclockwise to clockwise. The connection with the Stuttgart tram system was severed in 1994, when Stuttgart tram line 4 was shortened and its section serving Obertürkheim abandoned.

After more delays, construction of new overhead wires south to Zollberg began in November 1989. Trolleybus service to Zollberg was introduced on 31 August 1990, on route 118 (Hauptbahnhof – Zollberg). Routes 119 and 120 also began using dual-mode buses operating as trolleybuses on the route sections equipped with wiring. In 2001, it was reported that dual-mode bus operation on routes 119 and 120 would be phased-out in 2003. Following the removal of a section of wires used by routes 119–120 in March 2005, for nearby demolition work, the duobuses on those routes began operating in diesel mode at all times, and ultimately were replaced by diesel buses.

In the mid-2010s, plans were announced for the conversion of route 113 (Esslingen Bahnhof – Berkheim via Zollberg) to dual-mode trolleybuses, bringing back into use some of the wiring that had been used by routes 119–120 in the past. On 17 May 2016, route 113 began using dual-mode buses operating as trolleybuses over part of the route.

== Fleet ==
=== Current fleet ===
The present fleet is made up of 10 articulated trolleybuses built by Solaris, four of which have that maker's "MetroStyle" body.

| Fleet numbers | Image | Quantity | Manufacturer | Electrical equipment | Model | Configuration | Year built | Notes |
|---|---|---|---|---|---|---|---|---|
| 501–504 | | 4 | Solaris | Vossloh Kiepe (Note: Vossloh Kiepe was sold by Vossloh in early 2017 and renamed Kiepe Electric GmbH, so the electrical equipment of these two series of trolleybuses effectively came from the same company, but with a change of name.) | Solaris Trollino IV 18 MetroStyle | Articulated, low-floor | 2015 | |
| 505–510 | | 6 | Solaris | Kiepe | Solaris Trollino IV 18 | Articulated, low-floor | 2019 | |
On order
| 561–570 | | 10 | Škoda | Škoda | 32Tr | Two-axle, low-floor | 2026– | |
| 511–552 | | 42 | Škoda | Škoda | 33Tr | Articulated, low-floor | 2026– | |

Notes

In 2023, an order was placed with Van Hool for 12 new two-axle and 34 articulated trolleybuses, but that manufacturer went out of business in 2024, before any of the new vehicles for Esslingen had been completed. In March 2025, SVE announced a new order for 46 trolleybuses to be built by Škoda, a mix of articulated and two-axle configuration. It was subsequently expanded to a total of 52, of which 42 are to be articulated. The first two completed vehicles, one of each type, were unveiled at the factory in July 2026.

=== Past fleet ===
In the system's first decades, the fleet included trolleybuses built by MAN, Alfa Romeo, and Henschel, and after 1970 also ones built by Büssing and Daimler-Benz. After 2000, the now-retired fleet included only the following types:

| Fleet numbers | Image | Quantity | Manufacturer | Electrical equipment | Model | Configuration | Built | Last units withdrawn |
|---|---|---|---|---|---|---|---|---|
| 205 | | 1 | Daimler-Benz | AEG | O405T | Two-axle, high-floor | 1987 | 2002 |
| 310–328 | | 19 | Daimler-Benz | AEG | O405GTD | Articulated, high-floor | 1988–1994 | 2008 |
| 210–218 | | 9 | Van Hool | Kiepe | AG300T | Articulated, low-floor | 2002 | 2020 |

=== Preserved vehicles ===
Two trolleybuses have been preserved by SVE as historic/museum vehicles: Henschel HS160 OSL no. 22 and Van Hool AG300T no. 213.

== See also ==
- List of trolleybus systems in Germany
