= Stadtwerke Solingen =

German public transport company

Stadtwerke Solingen GmbH
- Former logo of Stadtwerke Solingen

Overview
- Owner: City Solingen
- Area served: Solingen and Wuppertal
- Locale: North Rhine-Westphalia
- Transit type: bus; trolleybus
- Number of lines: 6 (Trolleybus); 19 (Bus); 6 (Night bus)
- Line number: Hauptschule Höhscheid – Krahenhöhe; Albert-Schweitzer-Realschule; Theodor-Heuss-Realschule; Alexander-Coppel-Gesamtschule; Friedrich-Albert-Lange-Gesamtschule; Geschwister-Scholl-Gesamtschule / Uhlandstraße; Schulzentrum Leichlingen; Schulzentrum Vogelsang; August-Dicke-Gymnasium; Humboldtgymnasium; Gymnasium Schwertstraße
- Number of stations: 508
- Daily ridership: 65,000
- Headquarters: Weidenstraße 10, 42655 Solingen
- Website: www.sobus.net/

Operation
- Began operation: 30 December 1896

Technical
- System length: 219.4 kilometres (136.3 mi) (total); 162.8 kilometres (101.2 mi) (bus); 56.6 kilometres (35.2 mi) (trolleybus)

The Verkehrsbetrieb der Stadtwerke Solingen GmbH, or SWS, is a public transport company in the German city of Solingen and its surrounding area. Stadtwerke Solingen operates the Solingen trolleybus system as well as various bus lines and is a member of the Verkehrsverbund Rhein-Ruhr transport agency.

== History ==
=== Solingen city tramway ===
The metre gauge Solingen city tramway began operations on December 30, 1896, by the Union-Elektricitäts-Gesellschaft (UEG) from Berlin. The first route began by Stöckerberg near the tollgate, and down cologne street to the Südbahnhof, service began on June 7, 1897. Another line followed the same day, beginning at Neumarkt near the Kaiserstraße, next to Schützenstraße and down Burger Straße to Krahenhöhe it was 2.4 kilometers in length.
