= Trolleybuses in Eberswalde =

Public transit system in Brandenburg, Germany

Coordinates: 52°50′N 13°50′E

Eberswalde trolleybus system
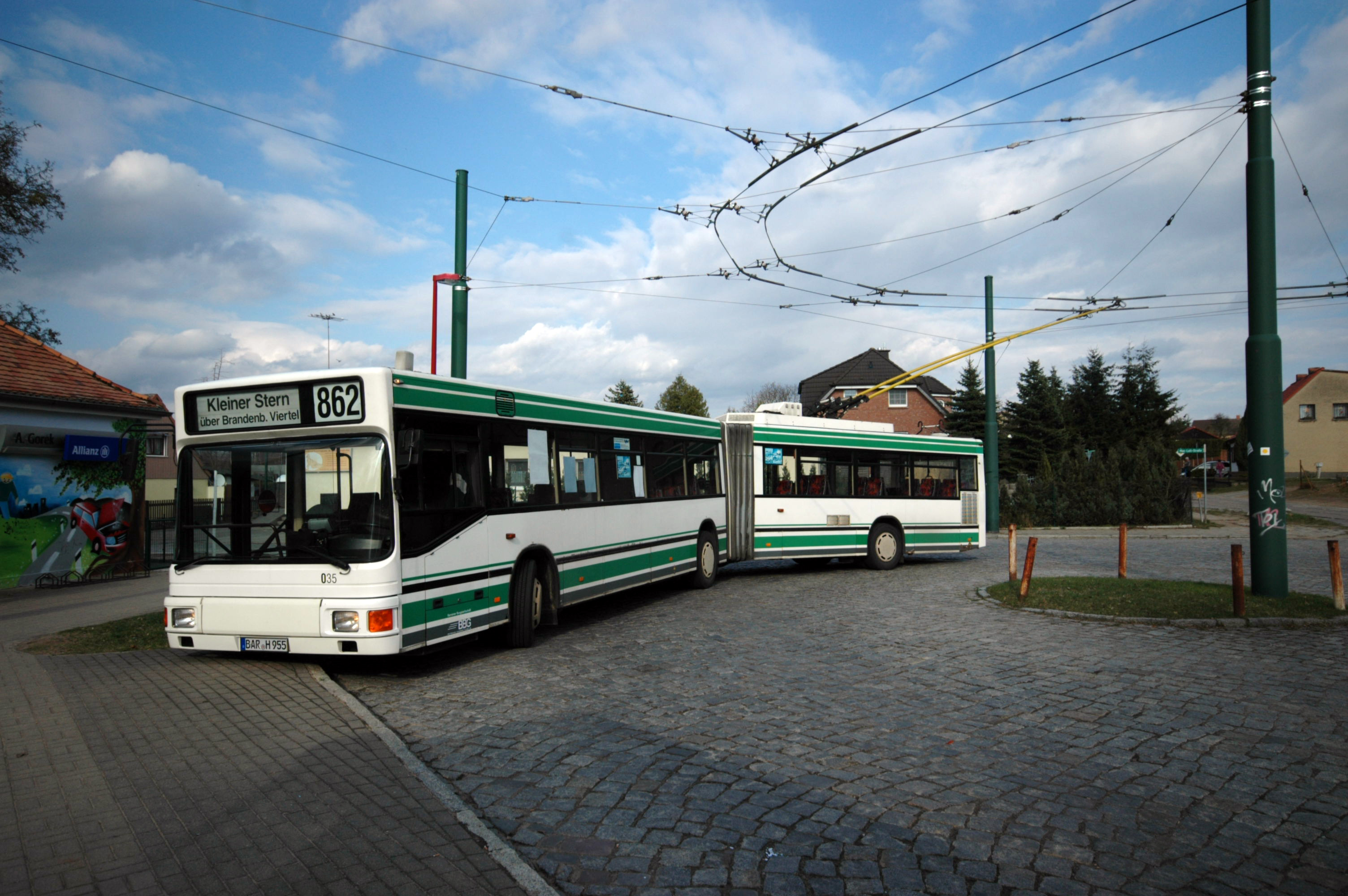
- An ÖAF Gräf & Stift NGE 152 M17 trolleybus in Eberswalde, 2011

Operation
- Locale: Eberswalde, Germany
- Open: 3 November 1940
- Status: Open
- Routes: 2
- Operator: Barnimer Busgesellschaft

Infrastructure
- Electrification: 600 V DC

Statistics
Overview
- Website: https://web.archive.org/web/20111223105828/http://www.bbg-eberswalde.de/aboutus.php Barnimer Busgesellschaft (in English)

The Eberswalde trolleybus system serves the city of Eberswalde, in the Land of Brandenburg, Germany.

Opened on 3 November 1940, it is the oldest of the three remaining trolleybus systems in Germany.

== History ==
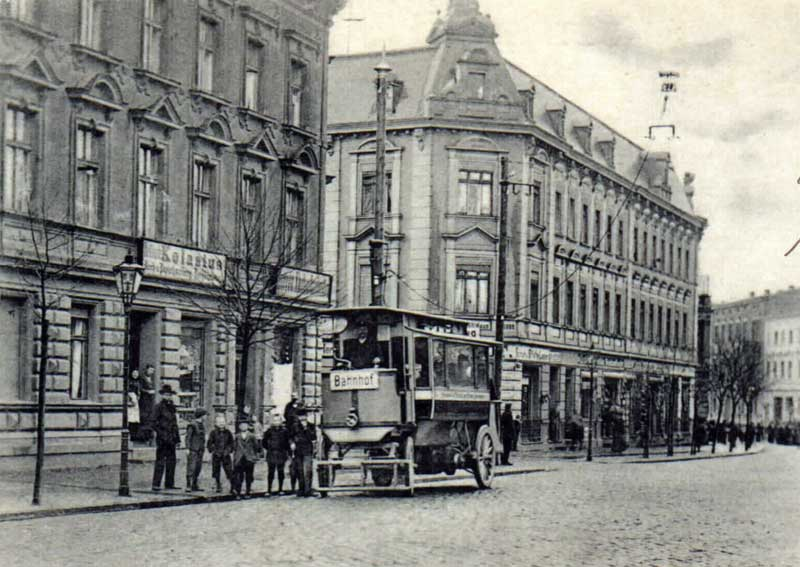
Trackless trolley at Alsenplatz

On 12 March 1901 the so-called trackless railway between Alsenplatz and the railway station was opened, but it was closed again in June of the same year. The technology of this first regularly operated trolleybus in Germany was not yet mature.

The present trolleybus system replaced, from 3 November 1940, the Eberswalde municipal tramway, which had operated from 1 September 1910 until 2 November 1940. The first five trolleybuses used (type MPE 1) had chassis from MAN in Nuremberg. The bodies were built by Schumann of Werdau in Saxony. The electric control of the 61-kilowatt twin-collector motor was achieved through a fine-step controller with double-stroke actuation. The electrical equipment was supplied by BBC. The overhead wiring was designed for a single-pole system. The total route length was 6.1 km, the line length 5.1 km.

During an air raid on 25 April 1945 the overhead wires were torn down and the depot burned down, destroying eight trolleybuses completely; the remaining two could be rebuilt. From 17 August 1945 the first line could be reopened.

In 1951 the single-pole system was converted to a two-pole system. In 1971 the trolleybus operation was integrated into the Kraftverkehr Frankfurt (Oder) combine.

From 1942 to 1985, trailers were used during peak demand. Eberswalde was thus the last German trolleybus system to conduct regular service with trailers. In later years a special permit was required, as passenger transport in trailers had not been permitted in the GDR since 1978. In 1975 three Škoda 9Tr buses from the discontinued Dresden trolleybus system came to Eberswalde. In 1980 the system was scheduled for closure, but due to rising oil prices it remained in operation. In 1985 the rectifier substation East was opened. From 6 November 1987 two lines operated for the first time, S1 and S2; the prefix “S” stood for "city" to distinguish them from interurban lines. On 28 June 1990 the operation was spun off into Speditions- und Verkehrsgesellschaft mbH Eberswalde-Finow, and in 1992 the transport division became the independent Barnimer Busgesellschaft. From 1 July 1993 fifteen low-floor trolleybuses of type NGE 152 by Gräf & Stift entered service. With the integration into the Verkehrsverbund Berlin-Brandenburg (VBB) in 1997, the three-digit line numbers still in use today were introduced. The two trolleybus lines run from Nordend (line 861) and Ostend (line 862) to the Brandenburgisches Viertel and cover most of the local public transport within the city. The two lines have a combined length of 37.2 km. The fifteen trolleybuses covered 870,500 km per year and carried 4.2 million passengers.

Ten Ikarus articulated vehicles were transferred after decommissioning in 1995 to the Timișoara trolleybus system in Romania, where some remained in service until 2008.

From 6 November 2010 the first generation of low-floor trolleybuses in Eberswalde was replaced by twelve Solaris Trollino 18 AC vehicles, with the last one entering service on 4 July 2012. The vehicles were still equipped with a diesel auxiliary drive, except for the last delivered one, which received a battery auxiliary drive instead. The battery system proved successful and was retrofitted to the other eleven vehicles.

In 2023 two Trollino 18 vehicles with a revised front design were delivered, already equipped with traction batteries from the factory.

Since 2024 these vehicles have also been operating on line 910, which partly runs without overhead wiring.

== See also ==
- Eberswalde Hauptbahnhof
- List of trolleybus systems in Germany
