= Trolleybuses in Guadalajara =

Transit system in Jalisco, Mexico

Guadalajara trolleybus system
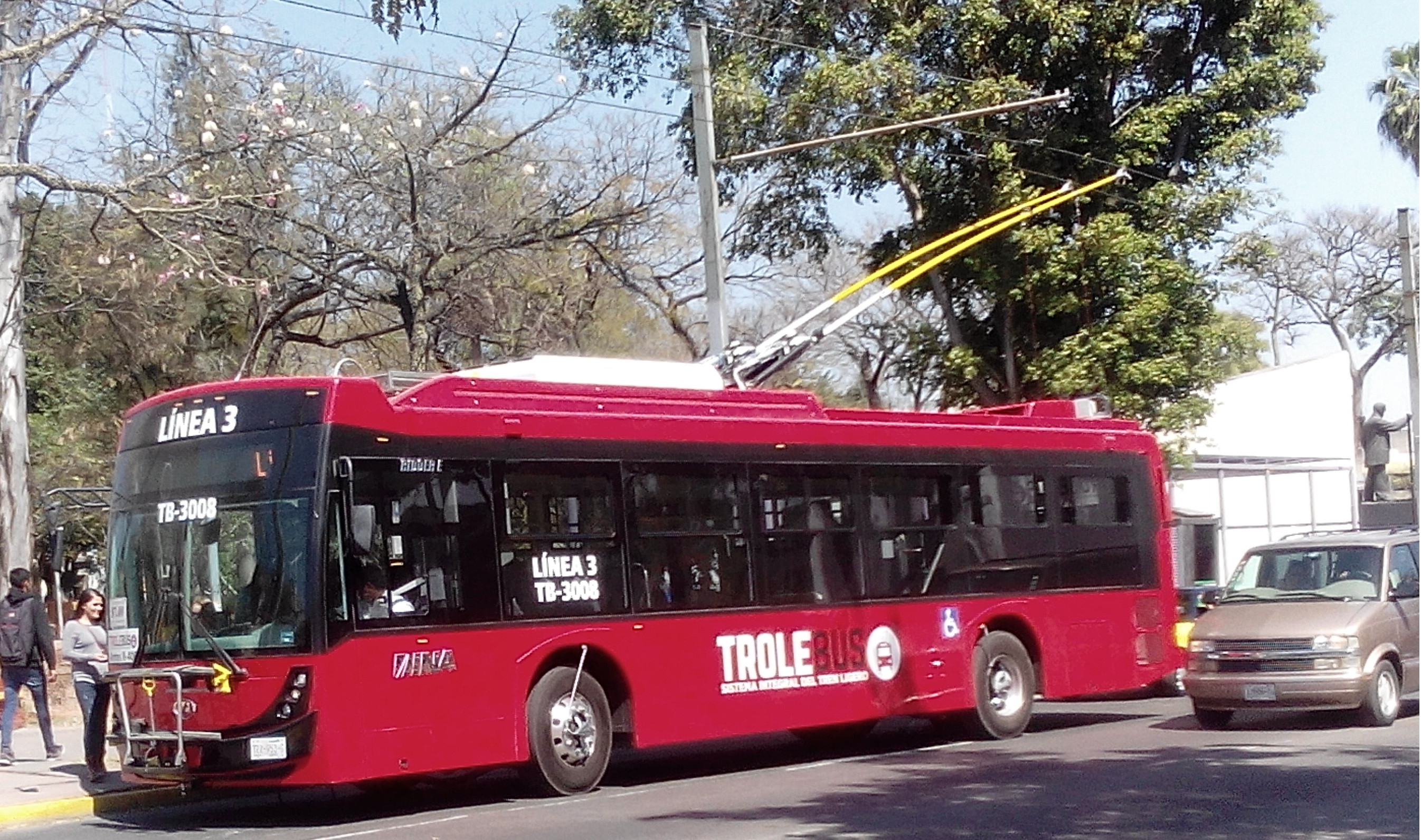
- A Guadalajara DINA trolleybus in 2016

Operation
- Locale: Guadalajara, Jalisco, Mexico
- Open: 15 December 1976
- Close: November 2025
- Status: Closed
- Routes: 5 (at maximum extent)
- Owner: Government of Jalisco
- Operators: 1976–2015: Sistecozome; 2016–2025: Sistema de Tren Eléctrico Urbano (SITEUR)

Infrastructure
- Electrification: 600 V DC
- Depot: 1
- Stock: 25 (in last 10 years)

Statistics
- 2017: 3.7 million
Overview
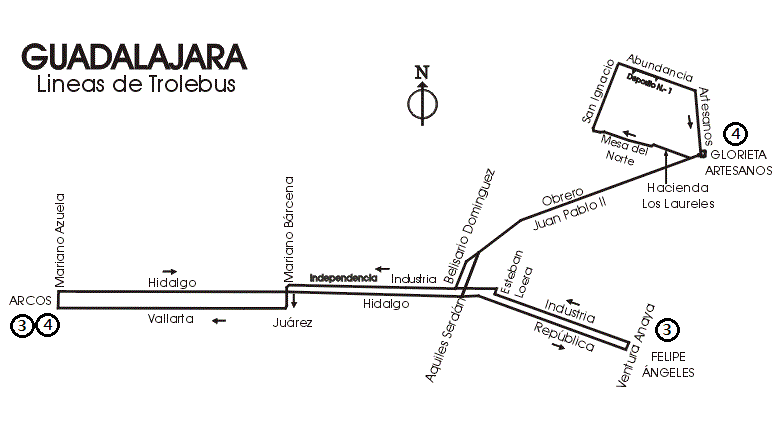
System map showing routes as of 2010, but with route numbers as of 2016. "Route 4" on this map was only a planned renumbering of route 500, which was never implemented, and that route remained in operation as Sistecozome route 500, using diesel buses.
- Website: http://www.siteur.gob.mx/sitren/caracteristicas.html SITEUR (in Spanish)

The Guadalajara trolleybus system (Spanish: Sistema de trolebuses de Guadalajara) served Guadalajara, the capital city of the state of Jalisco in Mexico, from 1976 to 2025.

Opened on 15 December 1976, the system was owned by the government of Jalisco. From its opening until January 2016, it was operated by Sistema de Transporte Colectivo de la Zona Metropolitana (Sistecozome), an agency of the Jalisco government. On 29 January 2016, operation was transferred from Sistecozome to another state agency, Sistema de Tren Eléctrico Urbano (SITEUR), which also operates the Guadalajara light rail system. A particularly notable feature of the system was its use, from the system's opening in late 1976 until circa 1 March 1988, of a trolleybus-only subway, with multiple stations, under Avenida Federalismo in the central part of the city. The subway was closed in 1988 so that it could be converted for use by light rail.

A new fleet of 25 DINA/Škoda trolleybuses was purchased in 2015, and they began to enter service on 2 February 2016, when the system reopened – now under its new operator – after a one-year suspension that had begun on 31 January 2015. Previously, the fleet had consisted of MASA trolleybuses, from 1982 until 2015, and originally ex-Chicago Marmon-Herrington trolleybuses, which had been in use from 1976 to 1993.

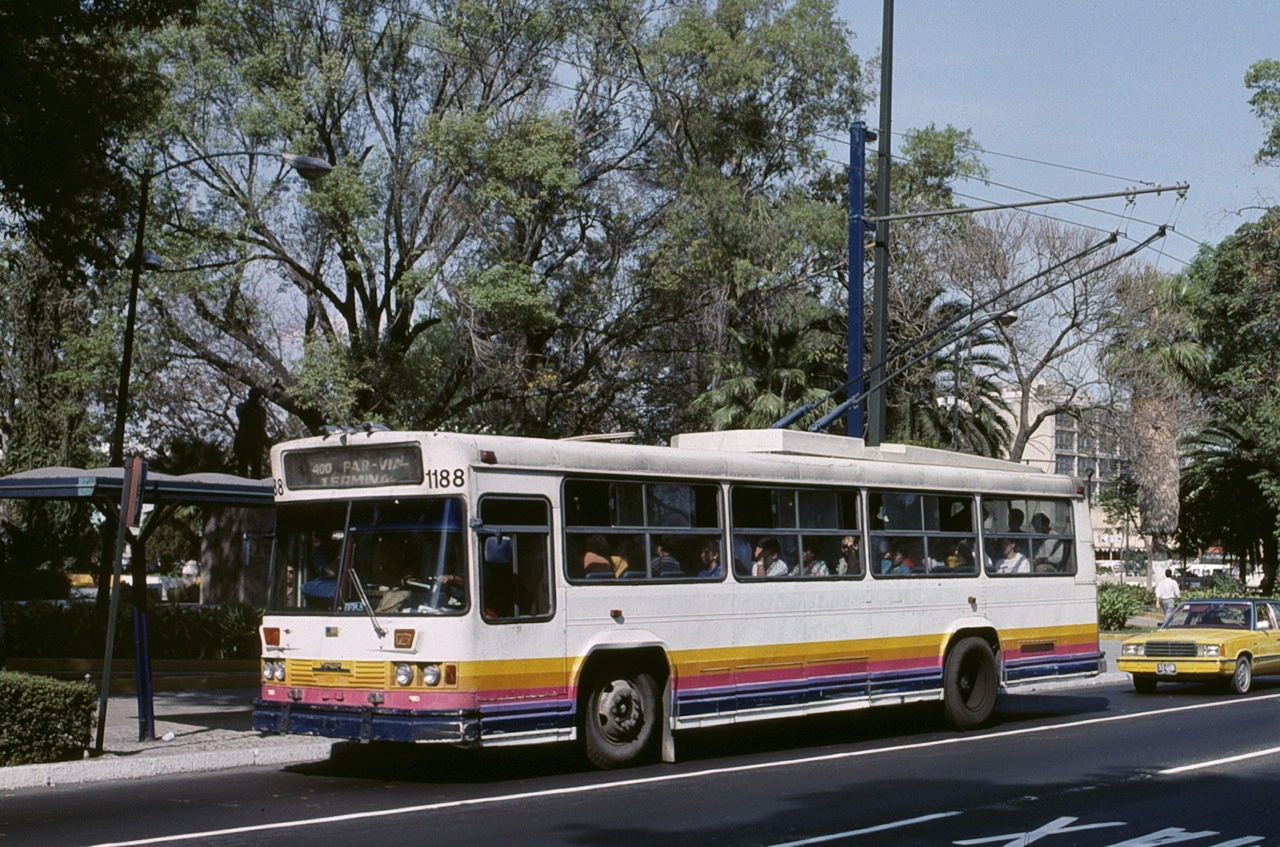
A Guadalajara MASA trolleybus in 1990

At the time of its reopening in February 2016 and introduction of the new operator and new fleet, the system had only one route, designated "Line 3" of SITEUR's "Sitren" bus network, an east–west route that was numbered 400 under Sistecozome. In January 2016, it was reported that officials planned also to transfer Sistecozome route 500, which has been operated by diesel buses since January 2015, to SITEUR and reinstate trolleybus operation to it, as Sitren Line 4, but by 2019 this had never occurred.

In November 2025 operator SITEUR announced that trolleybus service on line 3 has been replaced by buses. It has been reported that maintenance of the trolleybuses was severely neglected, to the point that in the last months of operation only one trolleybus remained in service.

== See also ==
- Guadalajara light rail system
- Guadalajara Macrobús
