= Botanischer Garten Solingen =

Botanical garden in Germany

Coordinates: 51.1845°N 7.0647°E

The Botanischer Garten Solingen is a 6-hectare (15-acre) botanical garden located at Vogelsang 2a, Solingen, North Rhine-Westphalia, Germany. It is open daily without charge.

== Garden ==
The garden dates to 1952 when the city opened its first greenhouse on a 4-hectare site, with the garden itself opening in 1963. In 1965 the tropical house was built (143 m^{2}, 8 meters in height), and in 1994-1995 the greenhouses were extended to 826 m^{2} by adding a cactus house and bromeliad house. In 2001 the garden was extended to over 6 hectares, and has gradually been handed off from city management to a nonprofit organization.

Today the garden's major sections are as follows:

- Alpinum (870 m^{2} or 9,400 sq ft) - alpine garden including Alyssum, Arabis, Aster, Aubrieta, Campanula, Cyclamen, Delphinium, Gentiana, Geranium, Primula, Ranunculus gramineus, Saxifraga, Sedum, Sempervivum, etc.
- Mediterranean garden (40 m^{2} or 430 sq ft) - plants from Southern Europe and Central America including fig, olive, and laurel trees, lavender, oregano, rosemary, sage, and thyme, as well as Cerastium and Potentilla.
- Greenhouses (826 m^{2} or 8,890 sq ft) - tropical house (with palm trees, sugar cane, wild rice, coca, cinnamon, and a large aquarium); orchids from Nicaragua and Vietnam; a cactus house containing about 250 species; and bromeliad house with about 220 species of bromeliad, as well as banana tree, vanilla, carnivorous plants, and coffee.
- Cottage garden (642 m^{2} or 6,910 sq ft) - a lawn with three maples and garden area (226 m^{2}) patterned on descriptions of the Garden of Eden with four streams, containing flowers such as daffodil, foxglove, iris, lily of the valley, lupine, marigold, nasturtium, peony, phlox, yarrow, etc.
- Biblical Garden (40 m^{2} or 430 sq ft) - eight beds, each a different geometric form, containing plants mentioned in the Bible, including barley, cistus, olive, pomegranate, wheat, etc.
- Flora Frey garden (139 m^{2} or 1,500 sq ft) - garden donated by the Flora Frey company, with bulbs including Dahlia as well as Chionodoxa, Crocus, Eranthis, Erythronium, Fritillaria meleagris, Galanthus, Leucojum, Muscari, Narcissus, Puschkinia, Scilla, Tulipa, etc.
- Pergola (60 m or 200 ft) - wild grapes, ivy, climbing hydrangea, and trumpet flower.
- Perennials garden (1,657 m^{2} or 17,840 sq ft) - aster, daisy, larkspur, peony, etc.
- Rose Garden (160 m^{2} or 1,700 sq ft) - about 100 rose varieties.
- Medicinal garden (60 m^{2} or 650 sq ft) - about 40 medicinal plants known from antiquity to the Middle Ages including Malva sylvestris, marigold, peppermint, rosemary, etc.
- Herb Garden (60 m^{2} or 650 sq ft) - herbs such as chives, mint, parsley, etc.
- Wild Bee Trail - an old orchard in which bees have a natural habitat.
- Fern walls - brick walls with Gymnocarpium robertianum.
- Heather garden (3,035 m^{2} or 32,670 sq ft) - Calluna and Erica, as well as birch, yew, Forsythia, Ilex, Pieris, Rhododendron, Skimmia, etc.
- Pond area ([2,139 m^{2} or 23,020 sq ft)] of which about [500 m^{2} or 5,400 sq ft] is water) - Japanese cherry trees, with carp, goldfish, roach, three-spined stickleback, etc.
- Iris Garden (1,169 m^{2} or 12,580 sq ft) - iris and daylily varieties.
- Reading room (170 m^{2} or 1,800 sq ft)
- Primelgarten (2,010 m^{2} or 21,600 sq ft)
- Conifers - A collection of conifers including Abies and Picea specimens, as well as Araucaria, Chamaecyparis, Cryptomeria, Larix pendula, and Metasequoia.
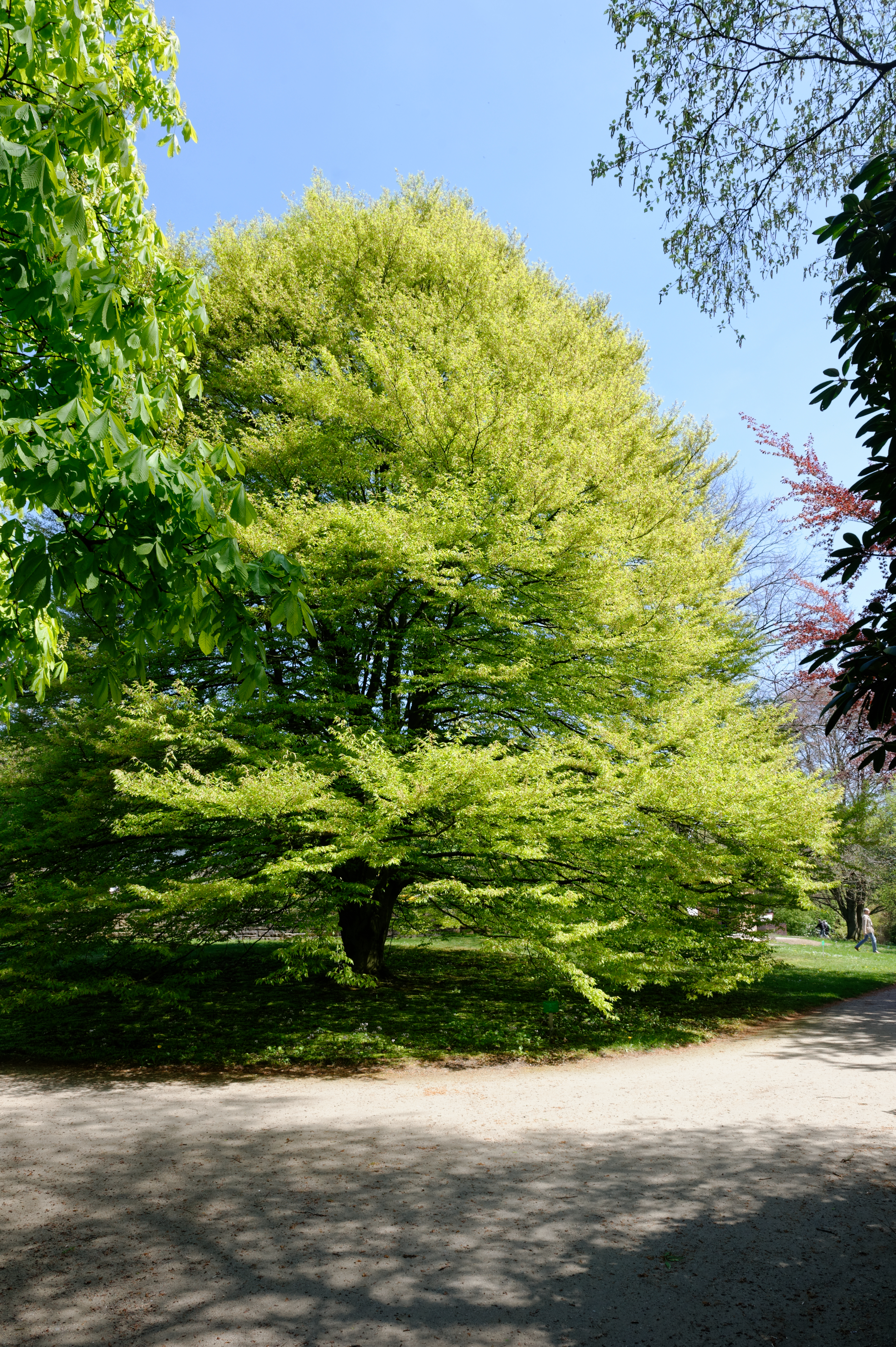

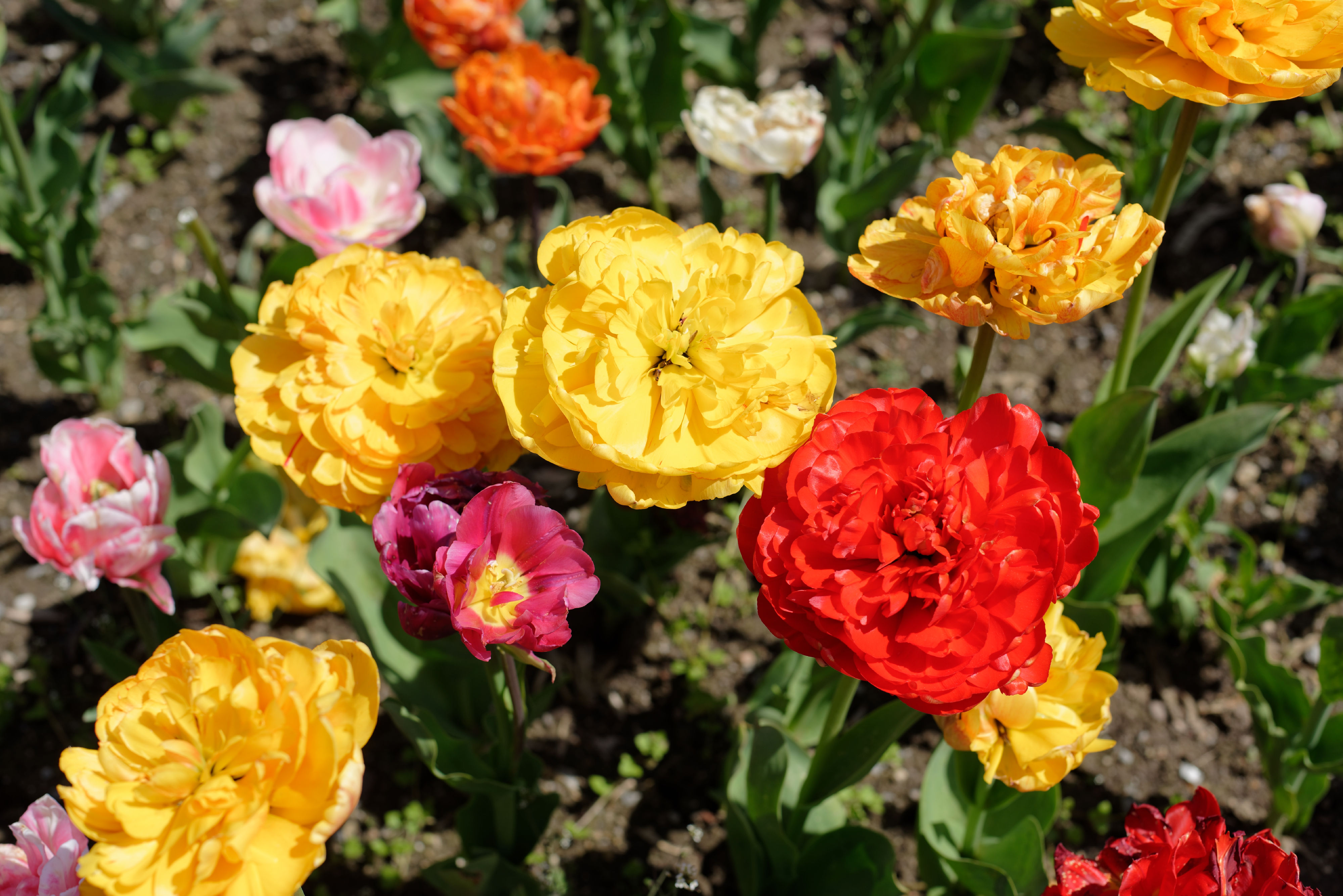

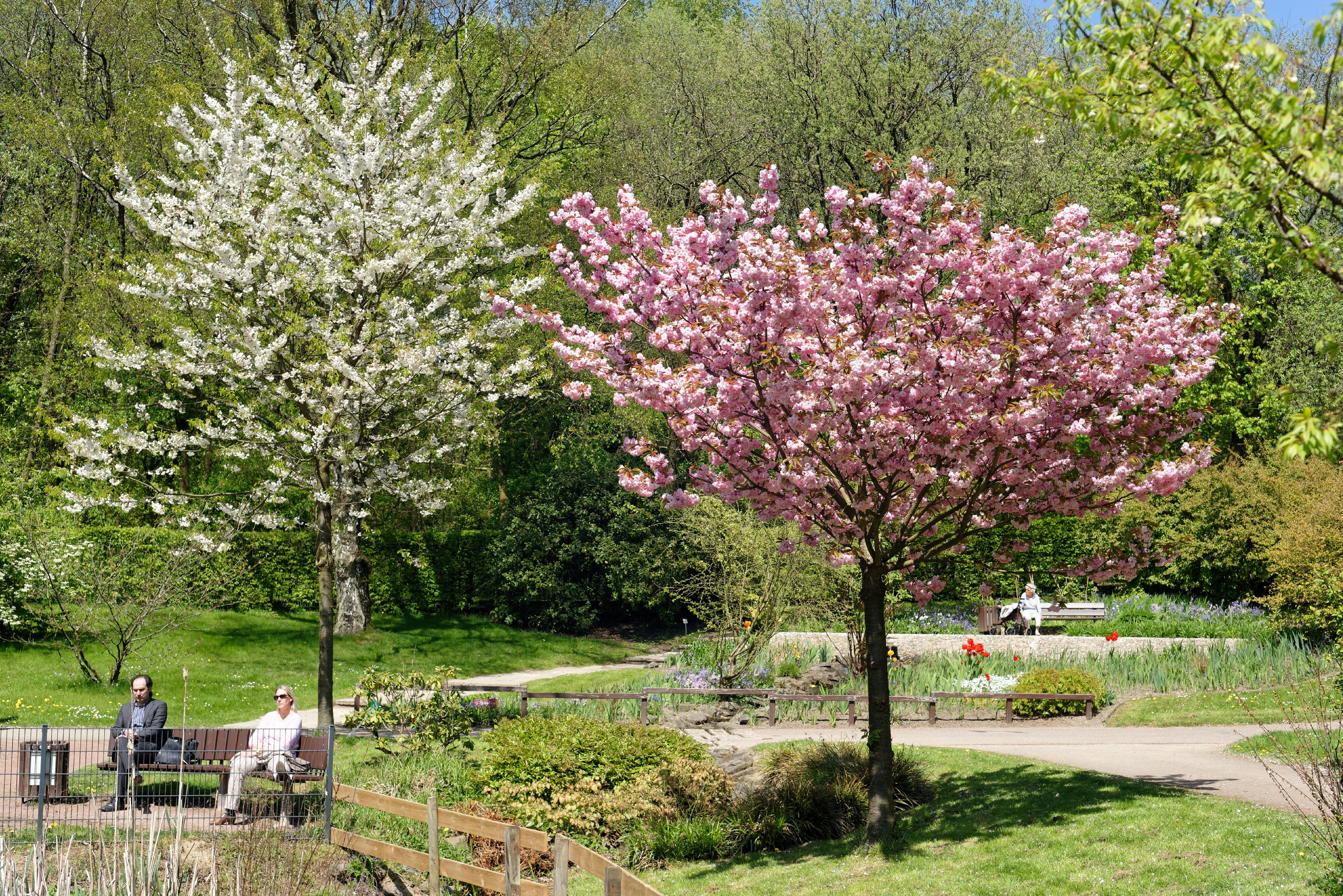

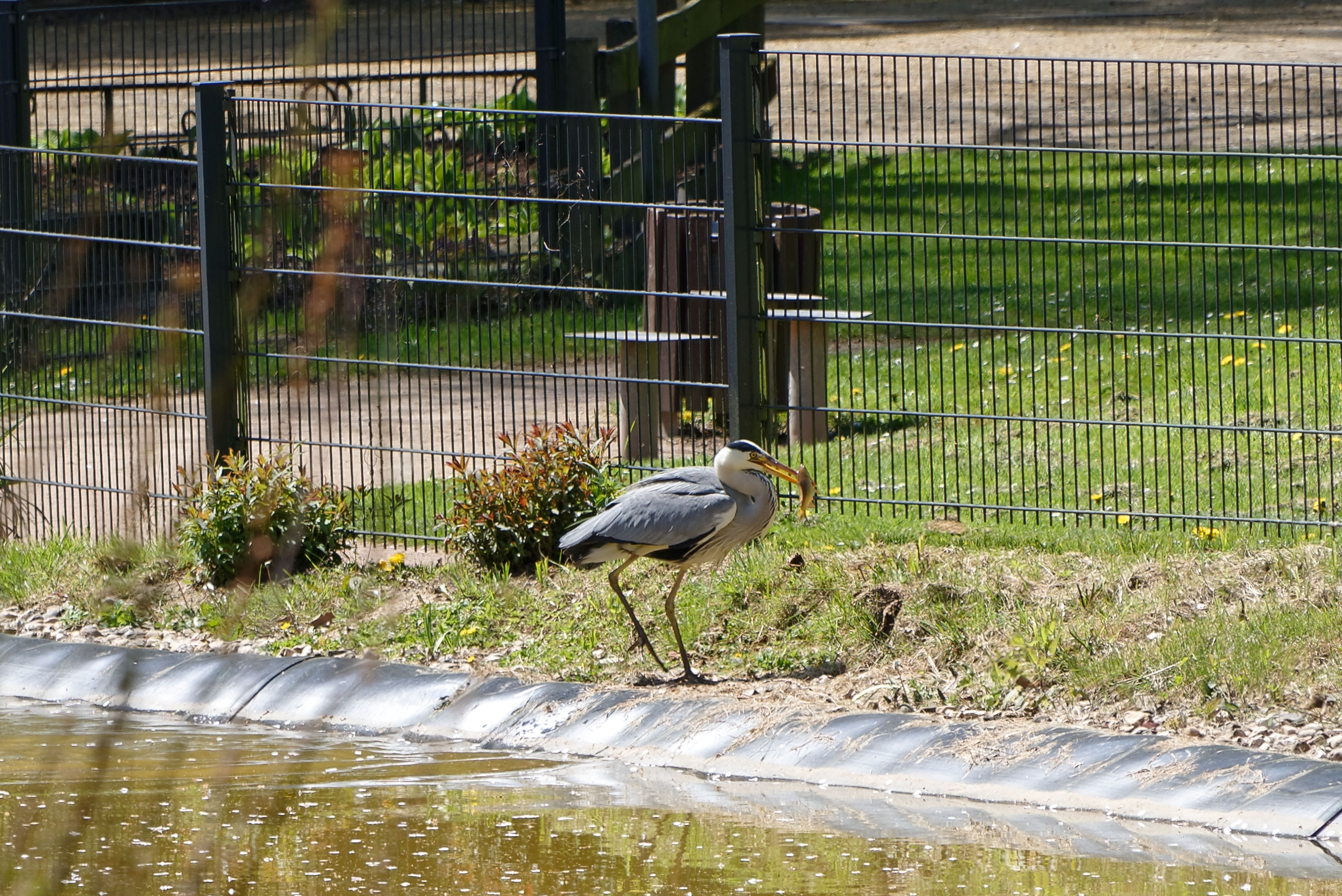

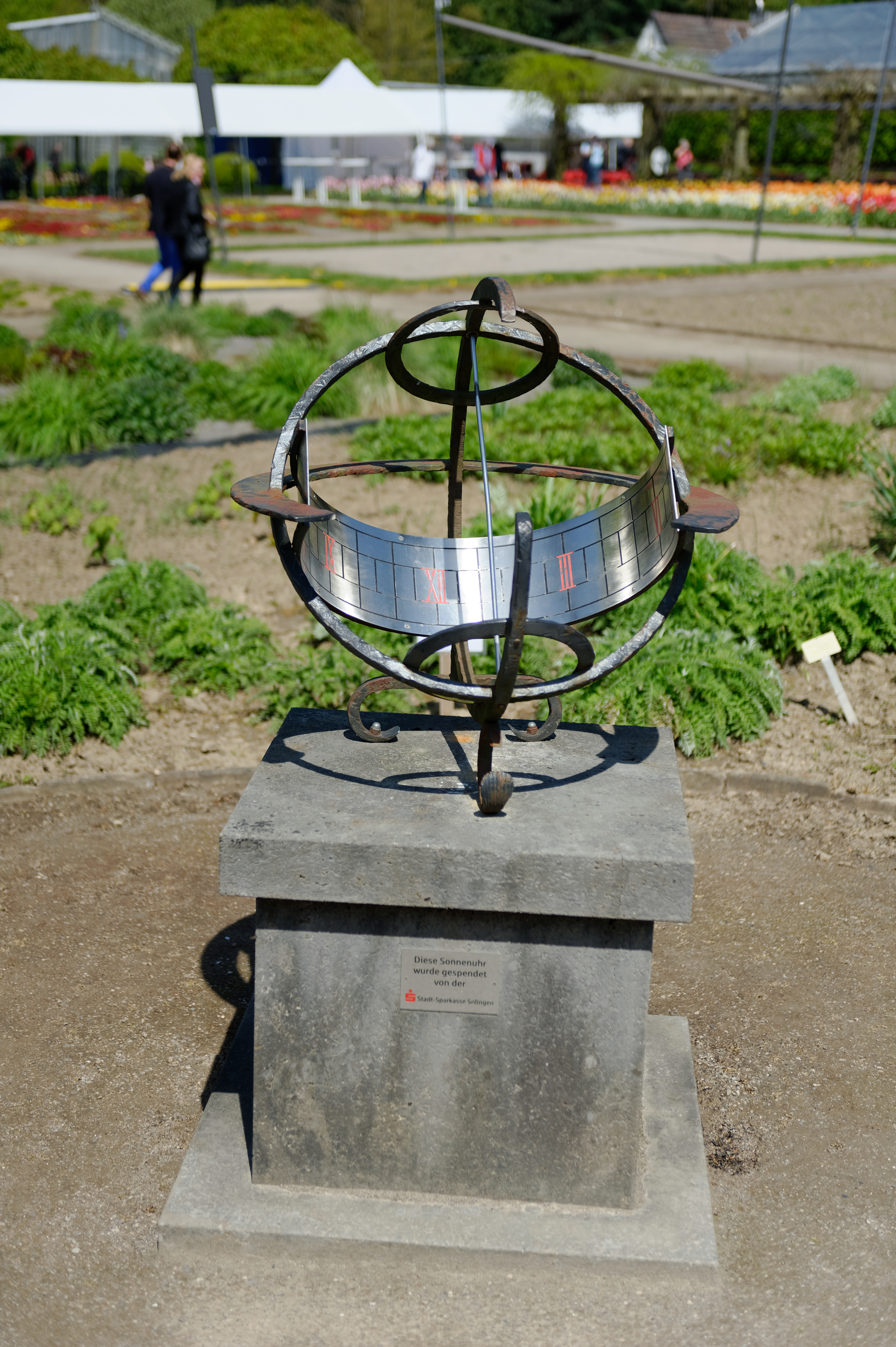

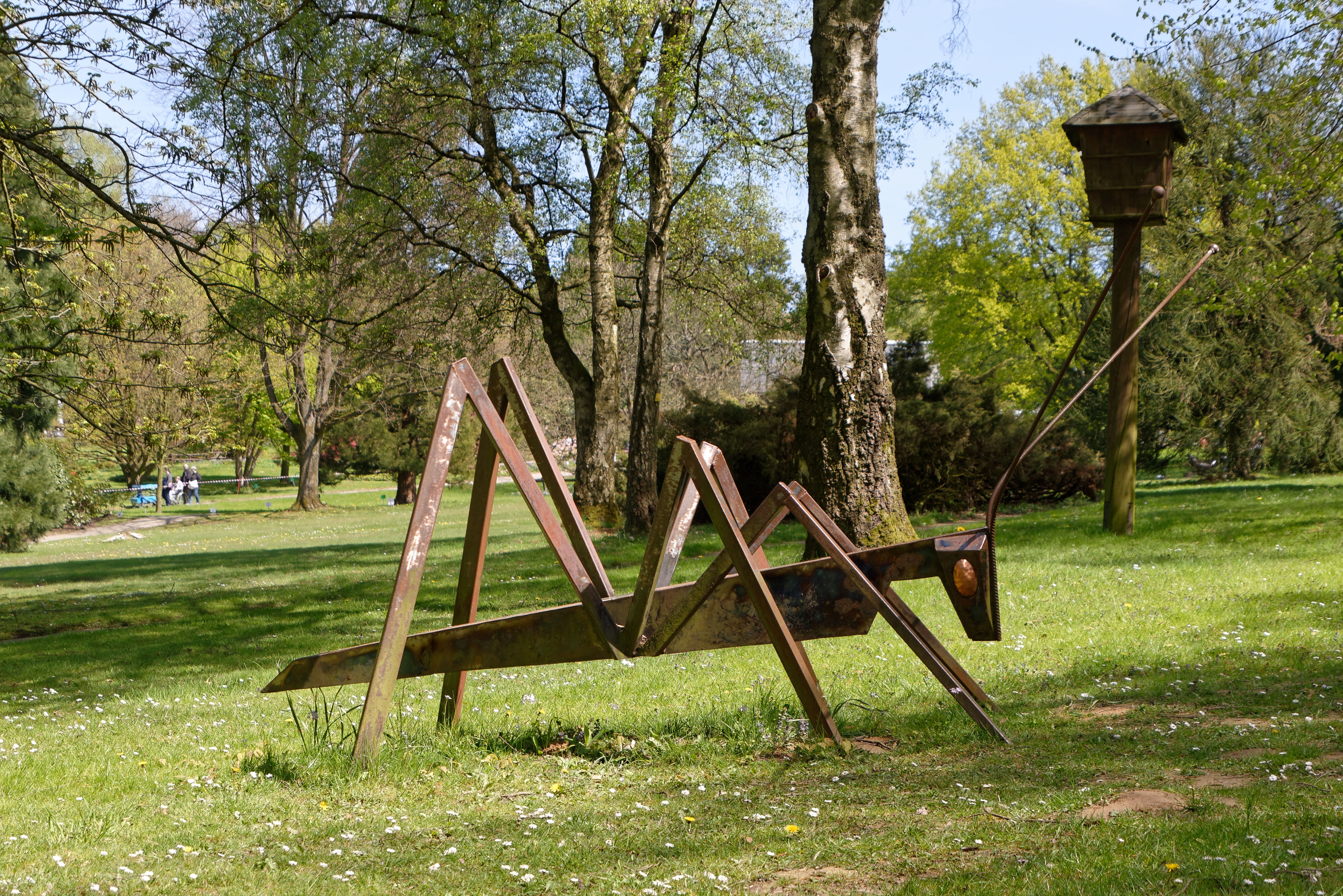

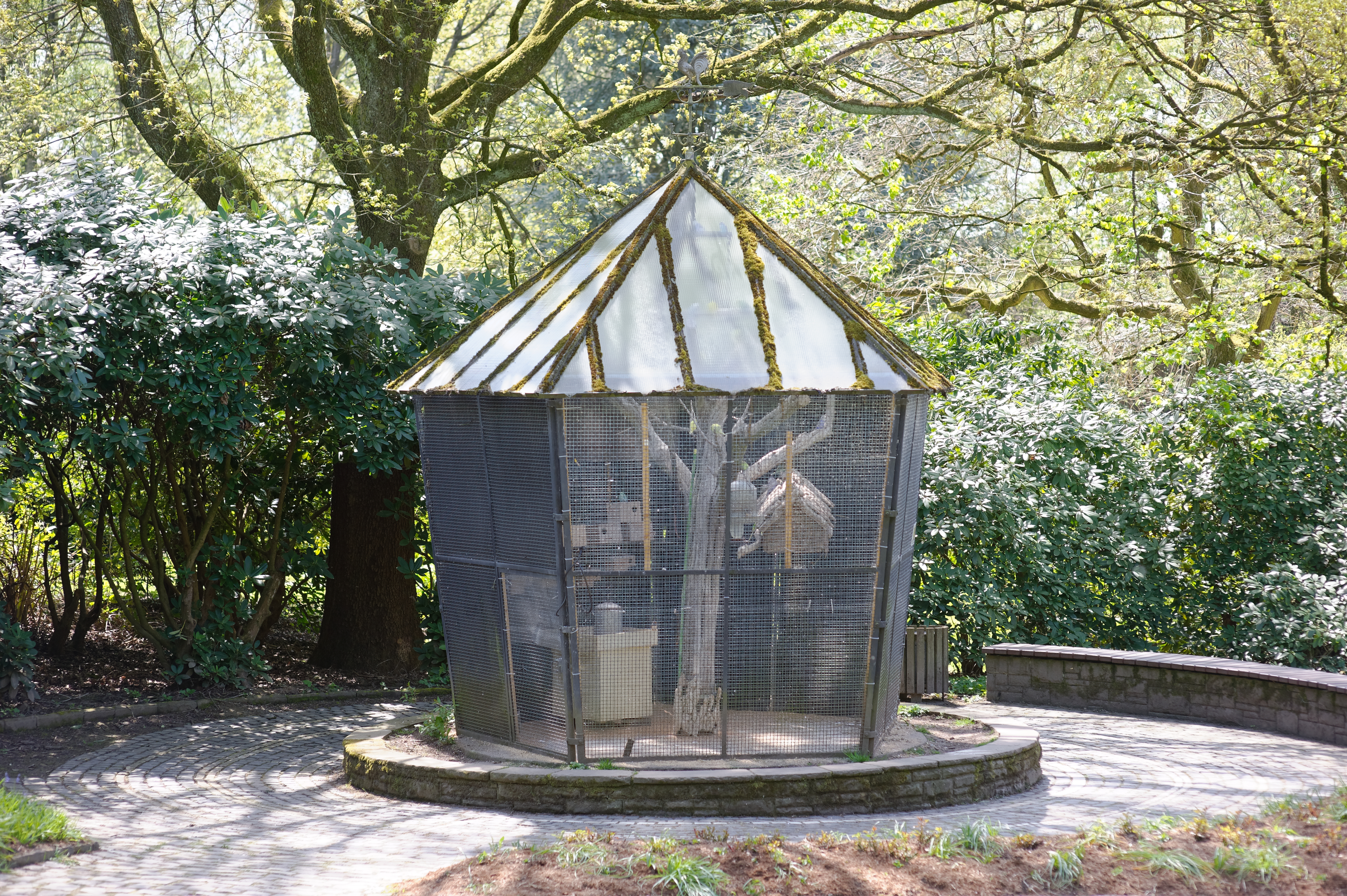

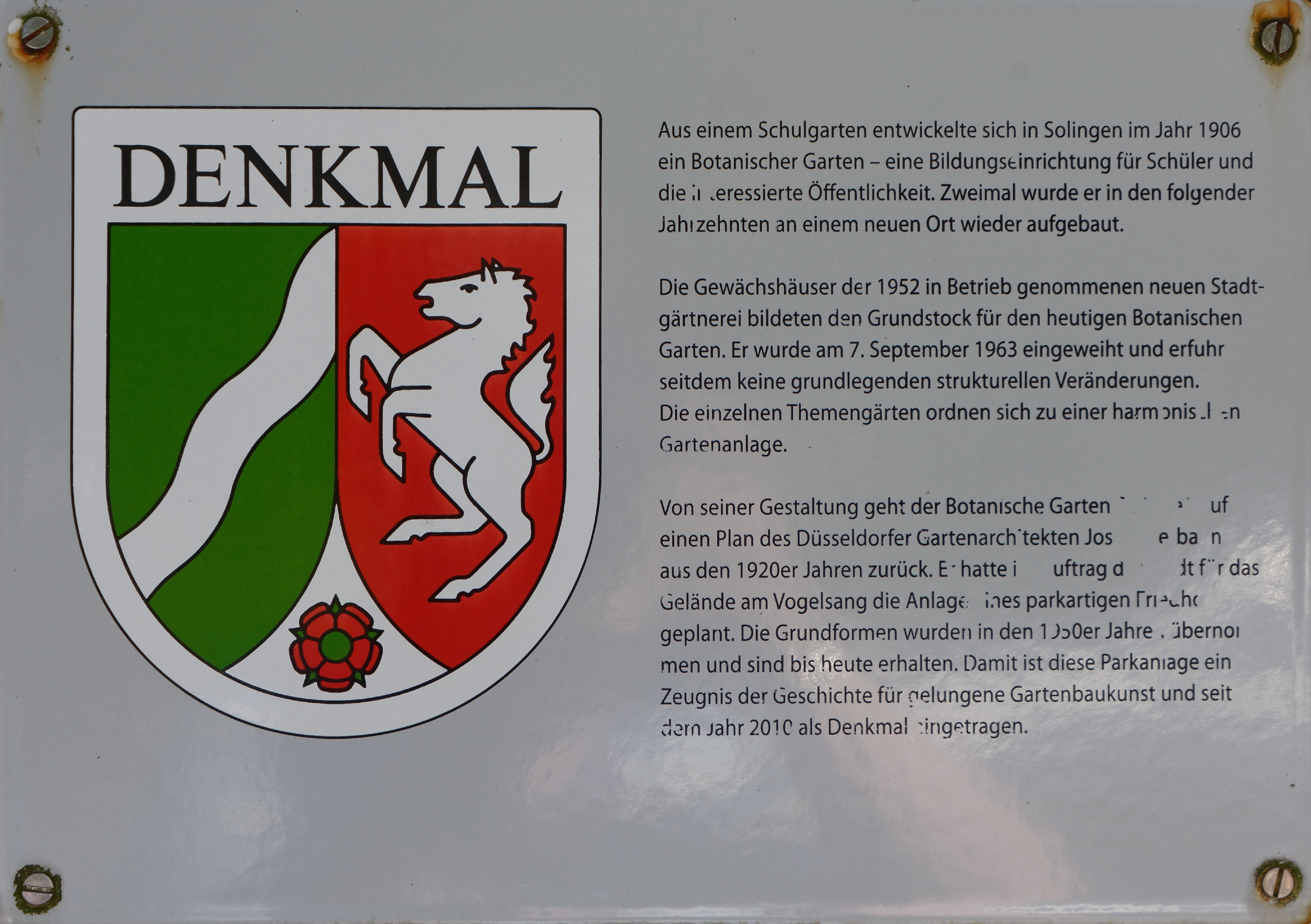

== See also ==
- List of botanical gardens in Germany
