= Solingen =

Solingen Solich (Limburgish)
- City
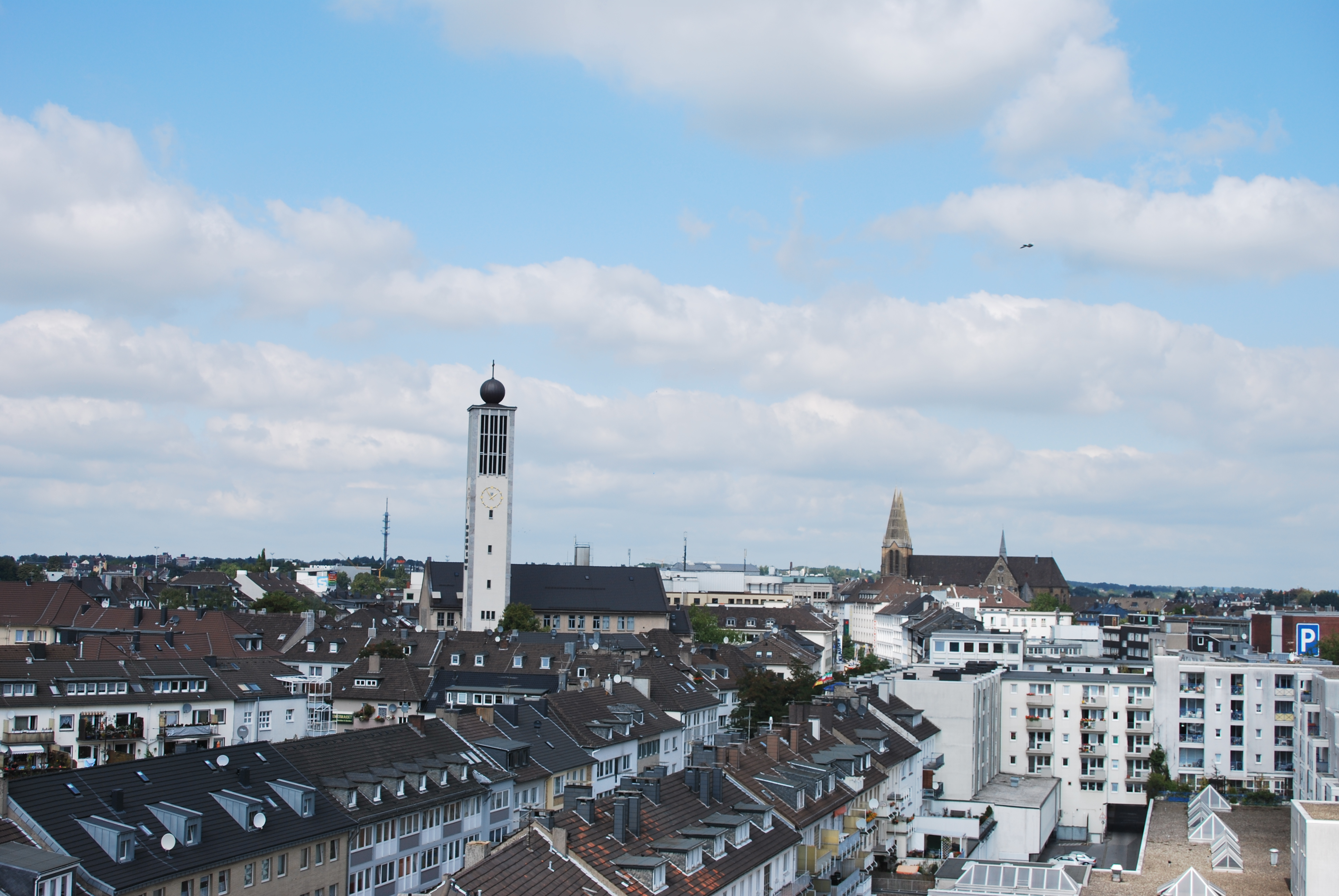
- Solingen-Mitte

- Flag Coat of arms
- Interactive map of Solingen
- Location within Germany Location within North Rhine-Westphalia
- Coordinates: 51°10′19″N 7°05′05″E
- Country: Germany
- State: North Rhine-Westphalia
- Admin. region: Düsseldorf
- District: Urban district

Government
  - Mayor (2025–30): Daniel Flemm (CDU)

Area
  - Total: 89.54 km^{2} (34.57 sq mi)
- Elevation: 53–276 m (174–906 ft)

Population (2025-12-31)
  - Total: 164,621
  - Density: 1,839/km^{2} (4,762/sq mi)
- Time zone: UTC+01:00 (CET)
  - Summer (DST): UTC+02:00 (CEST)
- Postal codes: 42601-42719
- Dialling codes: 0212
- Vehicle registration: SG
- Website: www.solingen.de

Solingen (German: [ˈzoːlɪŋən]; Limburgish: Solich) is a city in North Rhine-Westphalia, Germany, 25 km east of Düsseldorf along the northern edge of the Bergisches Land, south of the Ruhr. After Wuppertal, it is the second-largest city in the Bergisches Land, and a member of the regional authority of the Rhineland.

Solingen is called the Klingenstadt (City of Blades), and has long been renowned for the manufacturing of fine swords, knives, scissors and razors made by firms such as WKC, P.D Rasspe Söhne, DOVO, Wüsthof, Zwilling J. A. Henckels, Böker, Güde, Hubertus, Diefenthal, Puma, Clauberg/Klauberg, Eickhorn, Linder, Carl Schmidt Sohn, Dreiturm, Herder, Martor Safety Knives, Wolfertz, Ralf Aust and numerous other manufacturers.

The medieval swordsmiths of Solingen designed the town's coat of arms. In the late 17th century, a group of swordsmiths from Solingen broke their guild oaths by taking their sword-making secrets with them to Shotley Bridge, County Durham, in England. In the local dialect the Solinger Platt, a variety of the Limburgish language, the city is called Solich or Zóóliech.

== Geography ==
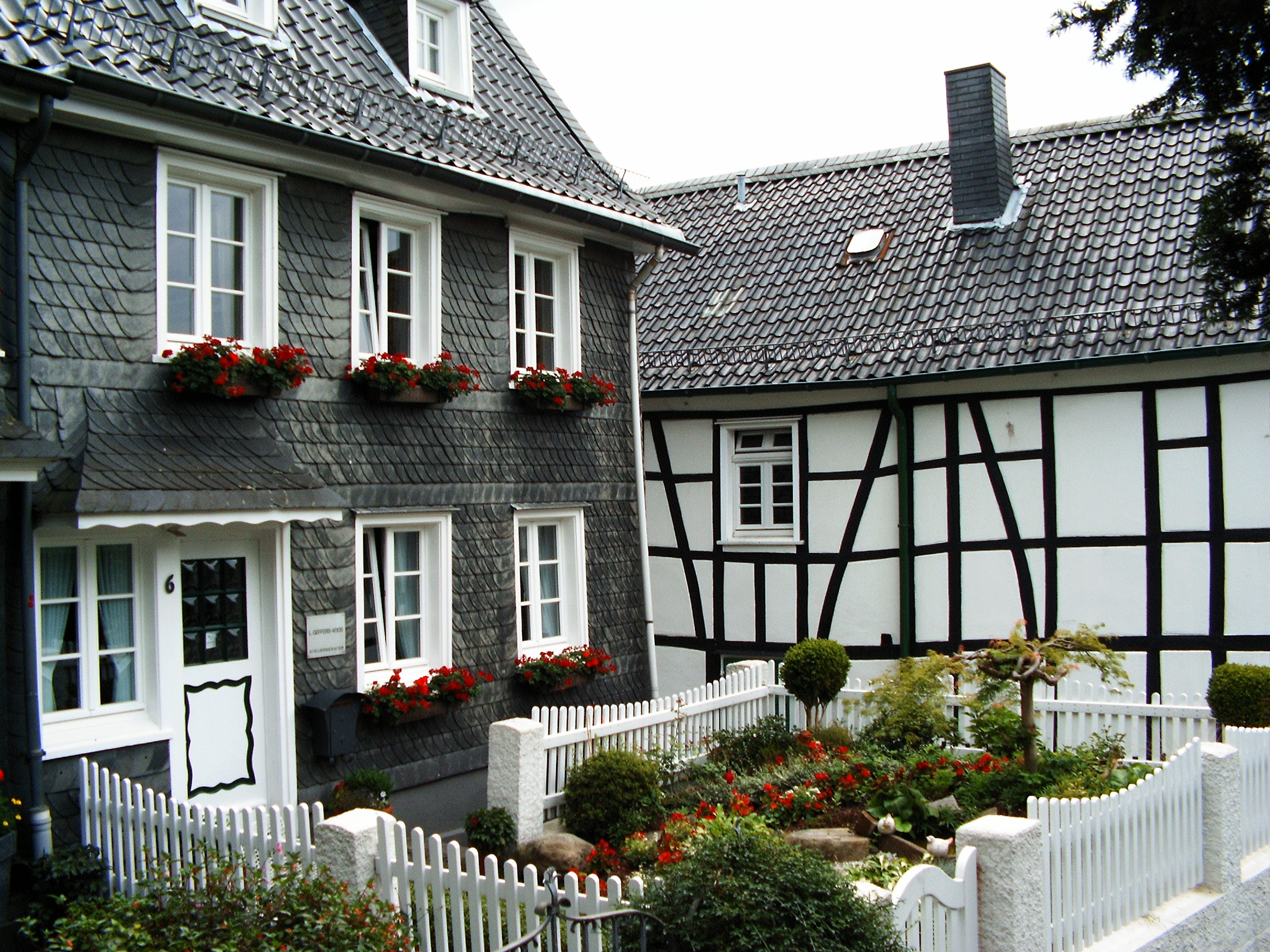
Typical houses in Solingen-Gräfrath

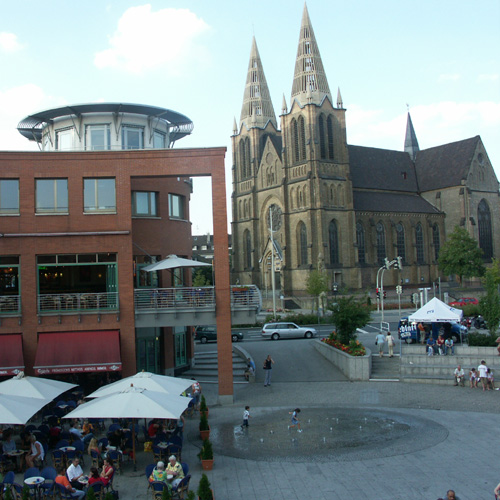
Solingen-Mitte: St. Clemens Church and Clemens Galerien

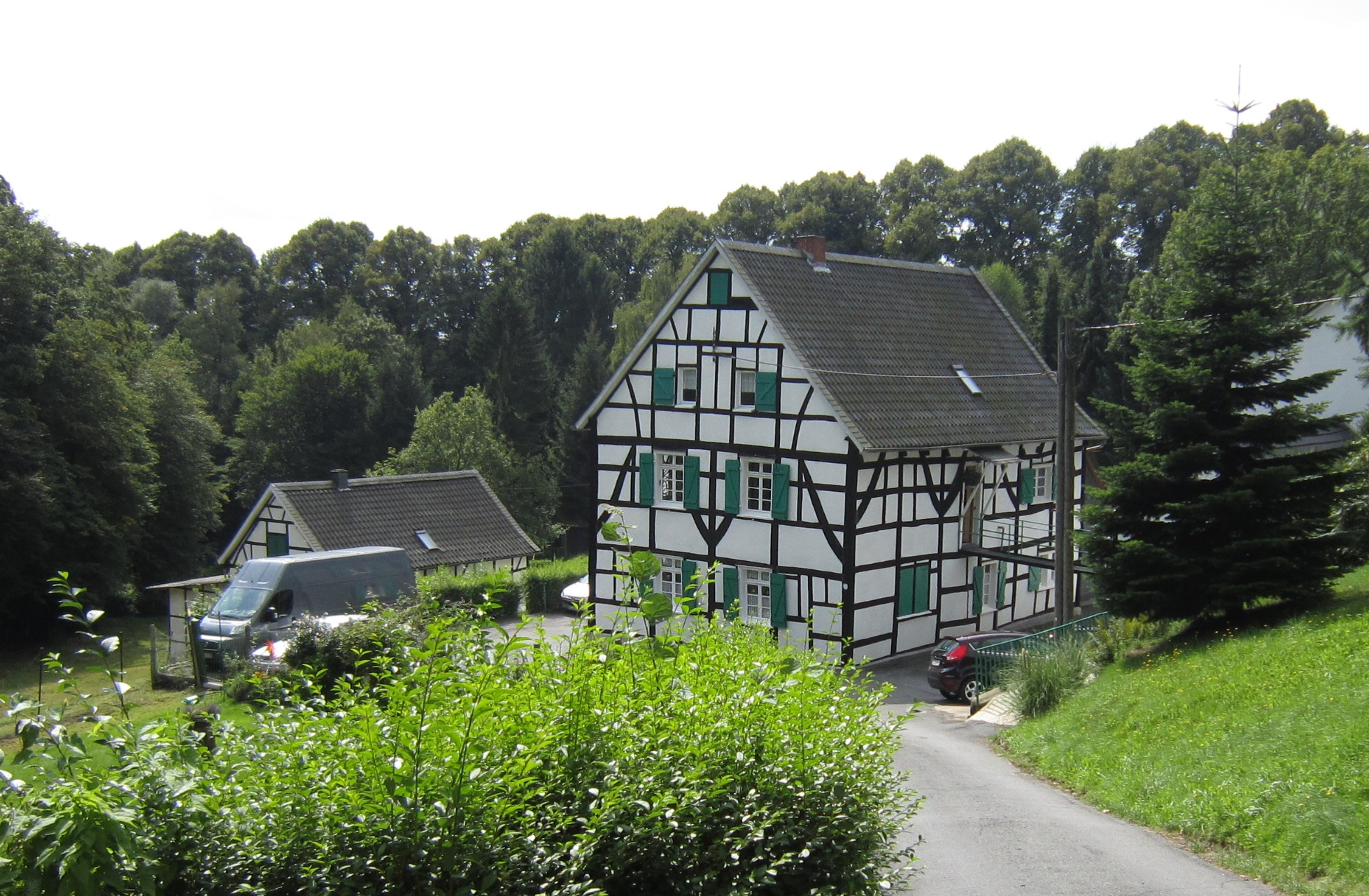
Mummenscheid farmyard in the borough of Wald

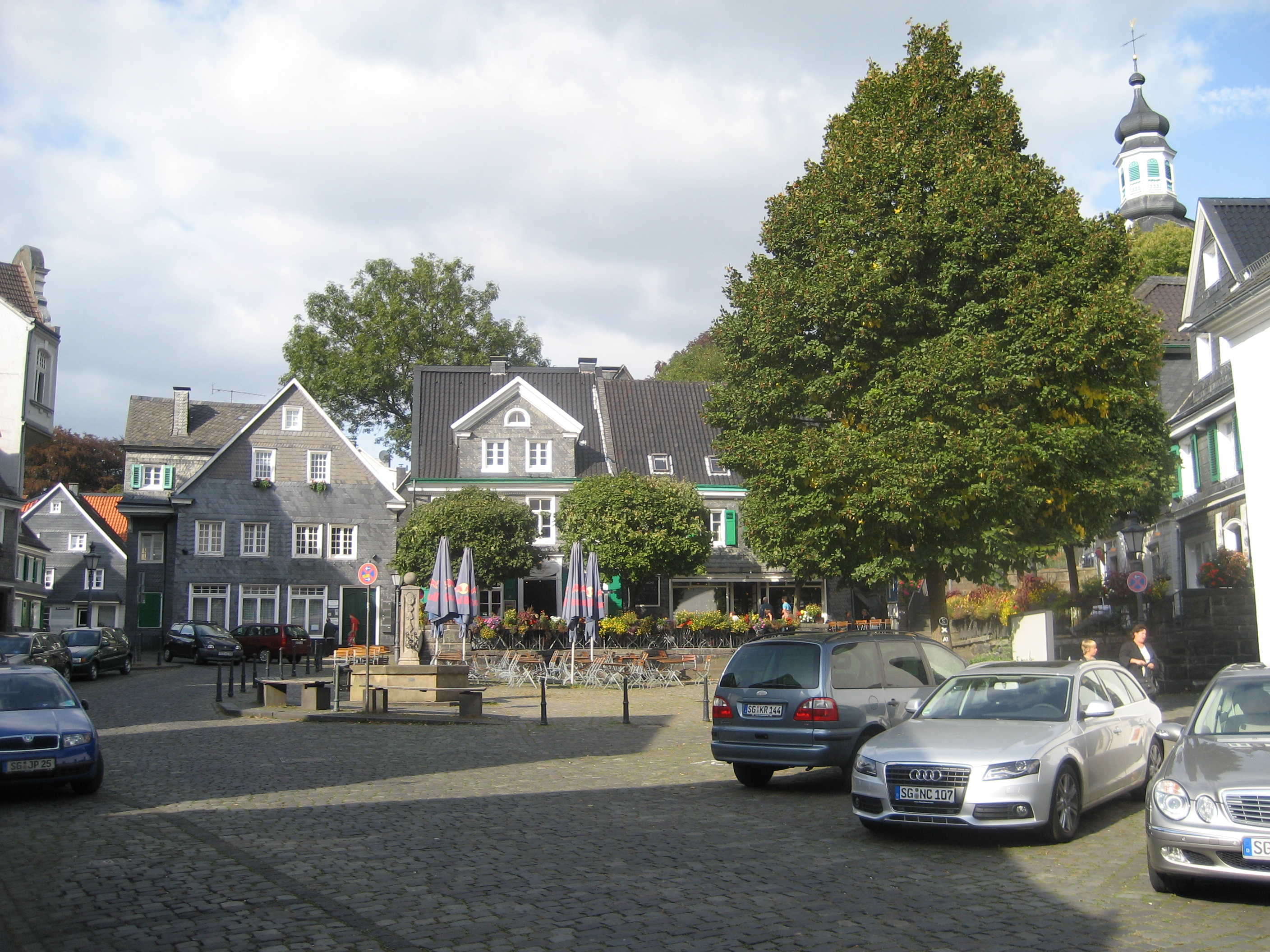
Historical marketplace in Gräfrath

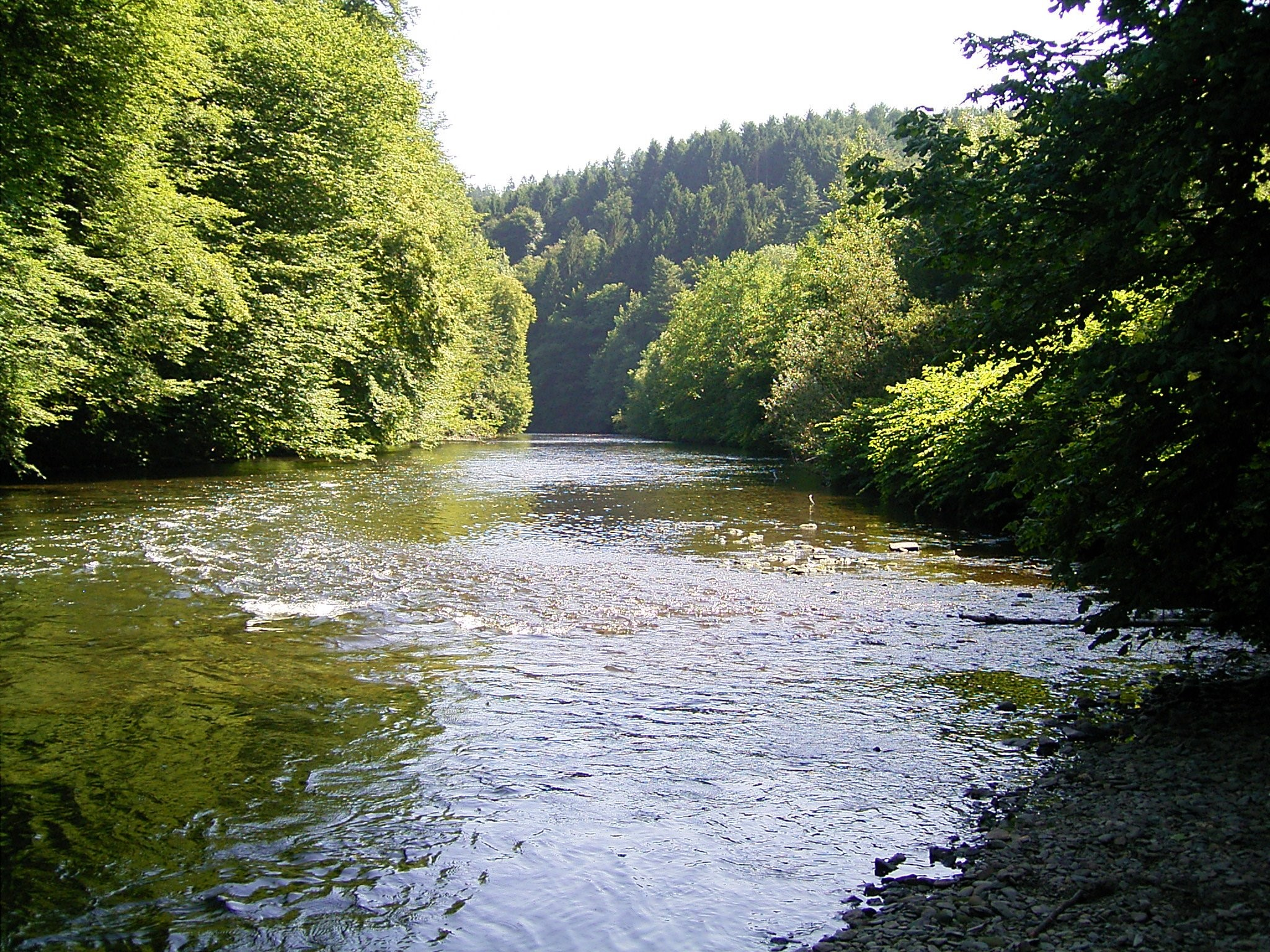
River Wupper

Solingen lies southwest of Wuppertal in the Bergisches Land. The city has an area of 89.45 square kilometres (34.54 sq mi), of which roughly 50% is used for agriculture, horticulture, or forestry. The city's border is 62 kilometres (39 mi) long, and the city's dimensions are 15.6 kilometres (9.7 mi) east to west and 11.7 kilometres (7.3 mi) north to south. The Wupper river, a right tributary of the Rhine, flows through the city for 26 kilometres (16 mi). The city's highest point at 276 metres (906 ft) is in the northern borough of Gräfrath at the Light Tower, previously the water tower, and the lowest point at 53 metres (174 ft) is in the southwest.

=== Neighbouring cities and communities ===
The following cities and communities share a border with Solingen, starting in the northeast and going clockwise around the city:

- Wuppertal (unitary urban district)
- Remscheid (unitary urban district)
- Wermelskirchen (within the Rheinisch-Bergischer district)
- Leichlingen (Rheinisch-Bergischer district)
- Langenfeld (within the district of Mettmann)
- Hilden (Mettmann)
- Haan (Mettmann)

=== City administration ===
Solingen currently consists of five Stadtbezirke, or boroughs. Each borough has a municipal council of either 13 or 15 representatives (Bezirksvertreter) elected every five years by the borough's population. The municipal councils are responsible for many of the boroughs' important administrative affairs.

The five city boroughs:

- Gräfrath
- Wald (Solingen)
- (Solingen-)Mitte
- Ohligs/Aufderhöhe/Merscheid
- Höhscheid/Burg

Ohligs/Aufderhöhe/Merscheid and Höhscheid/Burg are divided into sections ("Stadtteile") that were once separate towns and are still statistical and planning units but are no longer self-governing.

The city further comprises many neighborhoods with their own names, although they often lack precise borders:

Aufderhöhe: Aufderbech, Börkhaus, Gosse, Horn, Holzhof, Josefstal, Landwehr, Löhdorf, Pohligsfeld, Riefnacken, Rupelrath, Siebels, Steinendorf, Ufer, Wiefeldick
Burg: Angerscheid, Höhrath
Gräfrath: Central, Flachsberg, Flockertsholz, Focher Dahl, Fürkeltrath, Heide, Ketzberg, Külf, Nümmen, Piepersberg, Rathland, Schieten, Zum Holz
Höhscheid: Balkhausen, Bünkenberg, Dorperhof, Friedrichstal, Fürkelt, Glüder, Grünewald, Haasenmühle, Hästen, Katternberg, Kohlsberg, Meiswinkel, Nacken, Pfaffenberg, Pilghausen, Rölscheid, Rüden, Schaberg, Schlicken, Unnersberg, Weeg, Widdert, Wippe
Merscheid: Büschberg, Dahl, Dingshaus, Fürk, Fürker Irlen, Gönrath, Hübben, Hoffnung, Limminghofen, Scheuren, Schmalzgrube
Mitte: Entenpfuhl, Eick, Grunenburg, Hasseldelle, Kannenhof, Kohlfurth, Krahenhöhe, Mangenberg, Meigen, Müngsten, Papiermühle, Scheidt, Schlagbaum, Schrodtberg, Stöcken, Stockdum, Theegarten, Vorspel, Windfeln
Ohligs: Brabant, Broßhaus, Buschfeld, Caspersbroich, Deusberg, Engelsberger Hof, Hackhausen, Keusenhof, Mankhaus, Maubes, Monhofer Feld, Poschheide, Scharrenberg, Schnittert, Suppenheide, Unterland, Wilzhaus, Verlach
Wald: Bavert, Demmeltrath, Eschbach, Eigen, Fuhr, Garzenhaus, Itter, Kotzert, Lochbachtal, Rolsberg, Vogelsang, Weyer

=== Climate ===
Solingen's climate is classified as oceanic (Köppen: Cfb; Trewartha: Dolk). The average annual temperature in Solingen is 9.1 °C (48.4 °F). The average annual rainfall is 1,046.1 mm (41.19 in) with December as the wettest month. The temperatures are highest on average in July, at around 17.1 °C (62.8 °F), and lowest in January, at around 1.2 °C (34.2 °F).

The Solingen weather station has recorded the following extreme values:

- Highest Temperature 38.4 °C (101.1 °F) on 27 June 2026.
- Warmest Minimum 23.6 °C (74.5 °F) on 9 August 1992.
- Coldest Maximum −14.0 °C (6.8 °F) on 1 February 1956.
- Lowest Temperature −23.6 °C (−10.5 °F) on 27 January 1942.
- Highest Daily Precipitation 84.1 mm (3.31 in) on 17 April 1936.
- Wettest Month 267.8 mm (10.54 in) in September 1957.
- Wettest Year 1,420.0 mm (55.91 in) in 1954.
- Driest Year 720.6 mm (28.37 in) in 1959.
- Earliest Snowfall: 28 October 1950.
- Latest Snowfall: 3 May 1979.

Climate data for Solingen (1961−1990 normals, extremes 1936–2002)
Month	Jan	Feb	Mar	Apr	May	Jun	Jul	Aug	Sep	Oct	Nov	Dec	Year
Record high °C (°F)	14.2 (57.6)	18.8 (65.8)	23.9 (75.0)	28.4 (83.1)	31.6 (88.9)	36.6 (97.9)	36.2 (97.2)	35.2 (95.4)	33.0 (91.4)	25.9 (78.6)	19.5 (67.1)	16.6 (61.9)	36.6 (97.9)
Mean maximum °C (°F)	9.3 (48.7)	10.9 (51.6)	16.1 (61.0)	21.6 (70.9)	25.7 (78.3)	28.8 (83.8)	30.3 (86.5)	29.7 (85.5)	25.3 (77.5)	21.3 (70.3)	14.7 (58.5)	10.8 (51.4)	31.5 (88.7)
Mean daily maximum °C (°F)	3.2 (37.8)	4.8 (40.6)	8.1 (46.6)	12.3 (54.1)	17.1 (62.8)	20.0 (68.0)	21.5 (70.7)	21.4 (70.5)	18.2 (64.8)	13.7 (56.7)	7.5 (45.5)	4.3 (39.7)	12.7 (54.9)
Daily mean °C (°F)	1.2 (34.2)	2.0 (35.6)	4.7 (40.5)	8.2 (46.8)	12.6 (54.7)	15.5 (59.9)	17.1 (62.8)	16.7 (62.1)	13.7 (56.7)	10.0 (50.0)	5.1 (41.2)	2.3 (36.1)	9.1 (48.4)
Mean daily minimum °C (°F)	−0.8 (30.6)	−0.4 (31.3)	1.9 (35.4)	4.5 (40.1)	8.5 (47.3)	11.3 (52.3)	13.0 (55.4)	12.9 (55.2)	10.4 (50.7)	7.3 (45.1)	2.9 (37.2)	0.3 (32.5)	6.0 (42.8)
Mean minimum °C (°F)	−8.5 (16.7)	−6.9 (19.6)	−4.2 (24.4)	−1.2 (29.8)	2.1 (35.8)	5.7 (42.3)	7.9 (46.2)	7.8 (46.0)	5.1 (41.2)	1.6 (34.9)	−3.4 (25.9)	−6.9 (19.6)	−11.1 (12.0)
Record low °C (°F)	−23.6 (−10.5)	−20.1 (−4.2)	−11.6 (11.1)	−5.6 (21.9)	−2.2 (28.0)	2.0 (35.6)	5.0 (41.0)	4.5 (40.1)	1.2 (34.2)	−3.3 (26.1)	−8.2 (17.2)	−16.5 (2.3)	−23.6 (−10.5)
Average precipitation mm (inches)	94.5 (3.72)	66.5 (2.62)	90.1 (3.55)	70.8 (2.79)	82.6 (3.25)	95.7 (3.77)	99.4 (3.91)	82.5 (3.25)	80.6 (3.17)	78.4 (3.09)	96.5 (3.80)	107.5 (4.23)	1,046.1 (41.19)
Average extreme snow depth cm (inches)	10.9 (4.3)	8.4 (3.3)	5.0 (2.0)	1.5 (0.6)	0.1 (0.0)	0 (0)	0 (0)	0 (0)	0 (0)	0 (0)	2.9 (1.1)	7.0 (2.8)	16.2 (6.4)
Average precipitation days (≥ 0.1 mm)	20.6	15.8	18.8	16.3	16.5	16.3	15.7	15.5	15.3	15.3	18.8	20.0	204.9
Average relative humidity (%)	85.9	80.7	78.0	73.1	71.4	73.3	73.8	75.5	80.3	82.8	85.7	86.4	78.9
Source: DWD Open Data

== History ==
=== Middle Ages ===
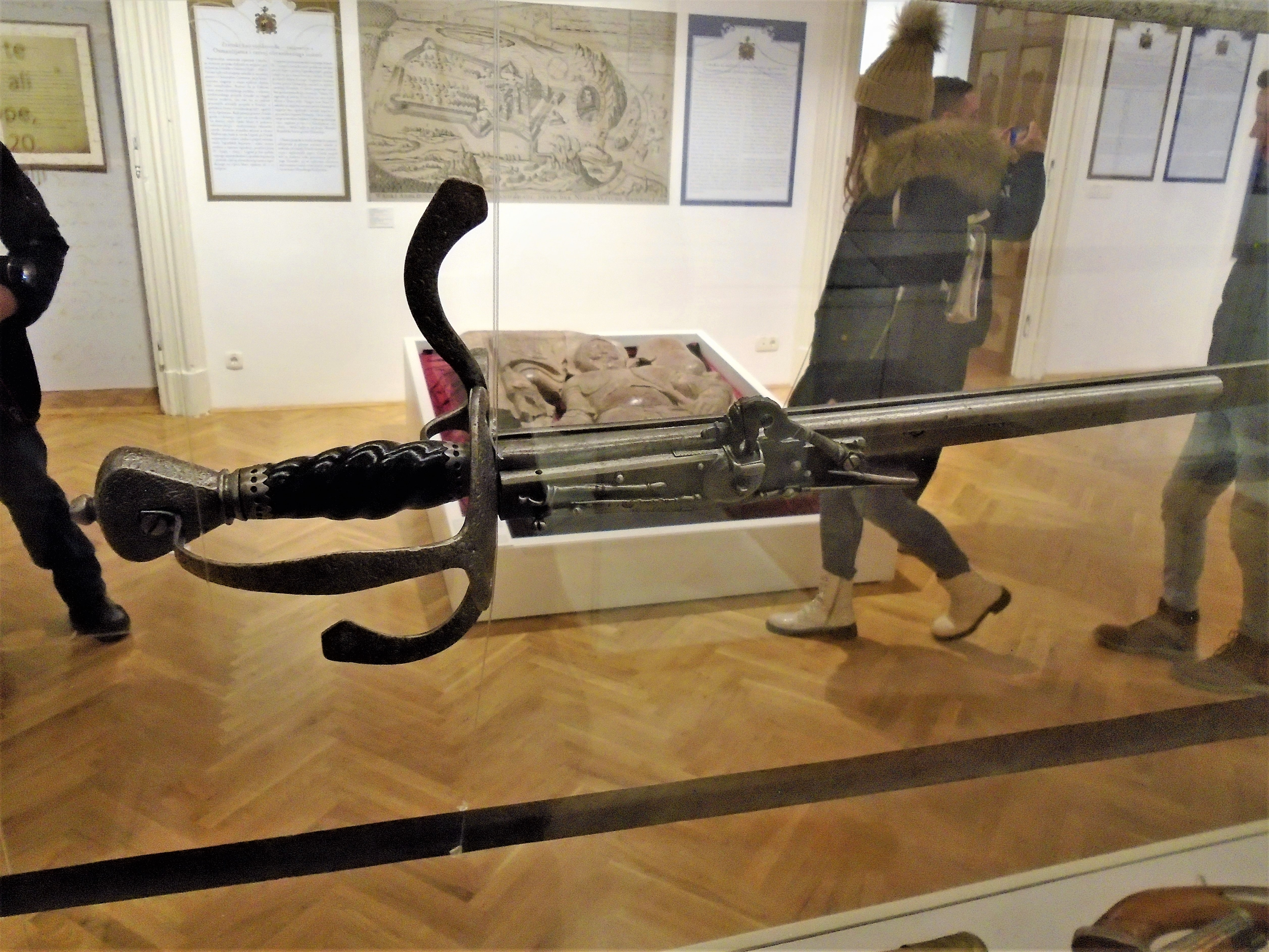
A sword with built-in flint wheellock pistol made in Solingen in 1575

Solingen was first mentioned in 1067 by a chronicler who called the area "Solonchon". Early variations of the name included "Solengen", "Solungen", and "Soleggen", although the modern name seems to have been in use since the late 14th and early 15th centuries.

Blacksmiths' smelters, dating back over 2000 years, have been found around the town, adding to Solingen's fame as a Northern Europe blacksmith centre. Swords from Solingen have turned up in places such as the Anglo-Saxon kingdoms in the British Isles. Northern Europe prized the quality of Solingen's manufactured weaponry, and they were traded across the European continent. Solingen today remains the knife-centre of Germany.

It was a tiny village for centuries, but became a fortified town in the 15th century.

=== Thirty Years' War ===
After being ravaged by the plague with about 1,800 deaths in 1614–1619, Solingen was heavily fought over during the Thirty Years' War, repeatedly attacked and plundered, and the Burg Castle was destroyed.

=== Modern Age ===
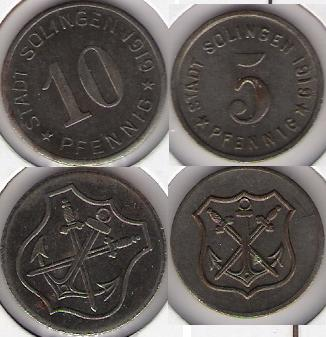
Coins issued in 1919 by the City of Solingen

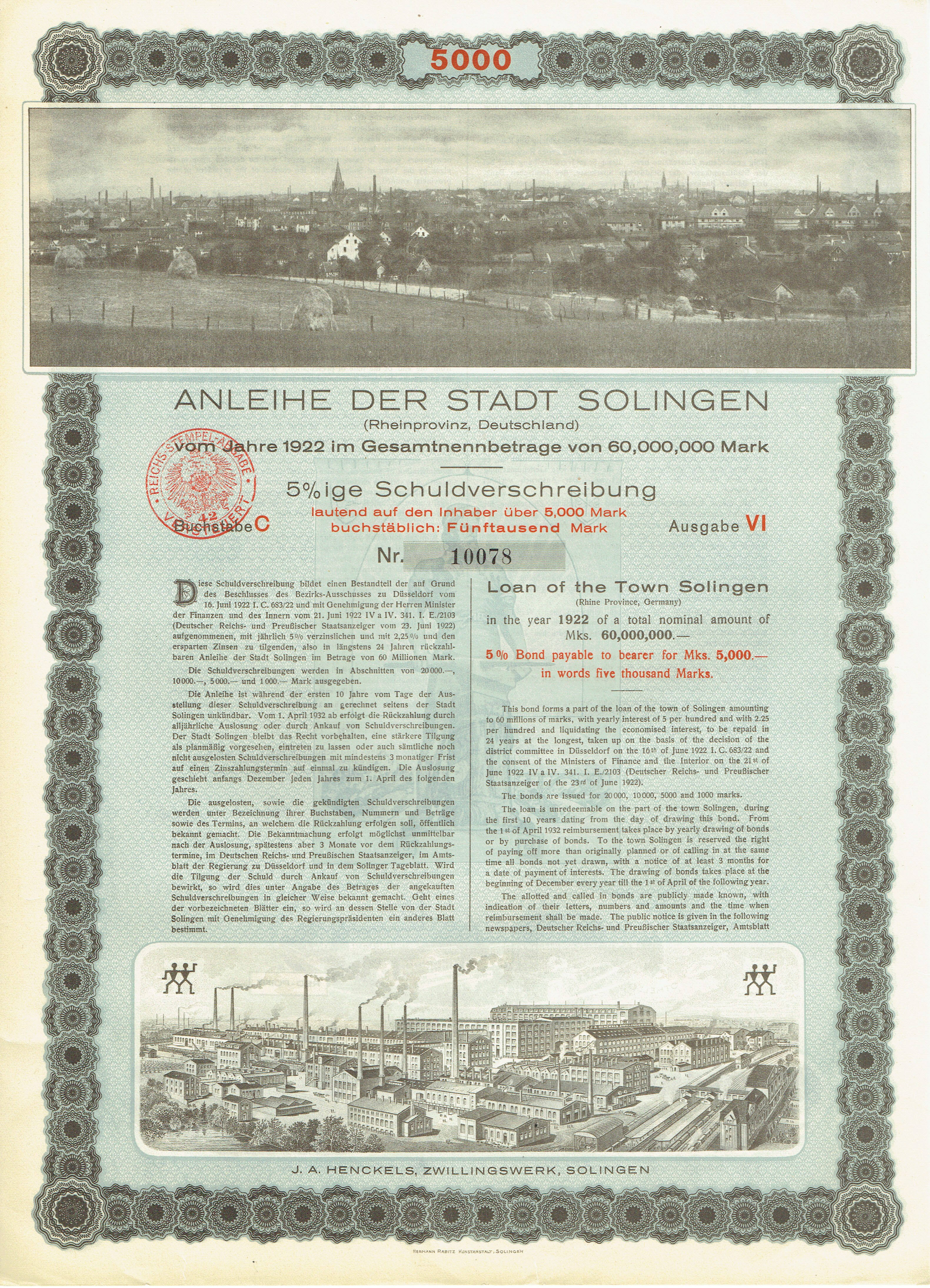
Bond of the City of Solingen, issued 1 July 1922

Early in the 20th century, Ohligs's chief manufactures were cutlery and hardware, and there were iron-foundries and flour mills. Other industries were brewing, dyeing, weaving and brick-making. In 1929, Ohligs located in the Prussian Rhine Province, 17 miles (27 km) by rail north of Cologne became part of Solingen.

In World War II, the Old Town was completely destroyed by a bombing raid by the RAF in 1944; 1,800 people died and over 1,500 people were injured. As such, there are few pre-war sites in the centre.

From 1945 to 1949 Solingen was part of the British occupation zone. Reconstruction of the old town began in 1949. The newly built Protestant church in Fronhof was consecrated in 1954, and the destroyed towers of the Catholic church of St. Clemens were rebuilt in a different style. By the end of the 1970s, the city's population had increased due to numerous new housing developments in all parts of the city. The city's infrastructure continued to grow, with the opening of the theatre and concert hall in 1963 and the construction of the Viehbachtalstraße motorway through the city in the late 1970s. In 1975, the city grew again with the incorporation of the previously independent town of Burg an der Wupper. In 1993, Solingen made international headlines for a right-wing extremist arson attack in which five Turkish girls and women were killed. The attack was followed by demonstrations and riots in the city.

Since the beginning of the new millennium, the Klingenstadt has undergone a massive transformation as a result of urban development projects such as Regionale 2006 and City 2013. For example, the new Korkenzieherstrasse cycle path was created and the demolition of the Turmhotel and the former Karstadt Passage made it possible to build a new shopping centre on Neumarkt in Solingen-Mitte. After the closure of the old central station in Solingen-Mitte, Ohligs station was officially named the new Solingen central station by Deutsche Bahn AG on 10 December 2006.

On 23 August 2024, during the city's 650th founding anniversary festival, an Islamic State terrorist stabbed eleven people, killing three, marking the first IS-claimed attack since the 2016 Breitscheidplatz truck attack in Berlin.

== Population ==
Solingen's population doubled between the years 1880 and 1890 due to the incorporation of the town of Dorp into Solingen in 1889, at which time the population reached 36,000. The population again received a large boost on 1 August 1929 through the incorporation of Ohligs, Wald, Höhscheid, and Gräfrath into the city limits. This brought the population above the 100,000 mark, which gave Solingen the distinction of being a "large city" (Großstadt). The number of inhabitants peaked in 1970 with 179,371 residents.

The following chart shows the population figures within Solingen's city limits at the respective points in time. The figures are derived from census estimates or numbers provided by statistical offices or city agencies, with the exception of figures preceding 1843, which were gathered using inconsistent recording techniques.

Historical population

Year	Pop.	±% p.a.
1747	2,000	—
1804	2,871	+0.64%
1818	4,000	+2.40%
1846	6,127	+1.53%
1861	10,100	+3.39%
1871	14,040	+3.35%
1880	16,900	+2.08%
1890	36,540	+8.02%
1900	40,843	+1.12%
1910	50,536	+2.15%
1919	48,912	−0.36%
1925	52,002	+1.03%
1933	140,162	+13.19%
1939	140,466	+0.04%
1945	129,440	−1.35%

Year	Pop.	±% p.a.
1956	161,353	+2.02%
1965	176,813	+1.02%
1970	179,371	+0.29%
1975	171,817	−0.86%
1980	166,091	−0.68%
1985	157,929	−1.00%
1990	165,401	+0.93%
1995	165,735	+0.04%
2000	164,973	−0.09%
2005	163,581	−0.17%
2010	159,927	−0.45%
2015	158,726	−0.15%
2020	159,193	+0.06%
2025	164,621	+0.67%

Population size may be affected by changes in administrative divisions. Source: Landesdatabank Nordrhein-Westfalen (1965-2025)

30.9% of the population of Solingen has foreign roots (statistics 2012).

Largest groups of foreign residents
Nationality	Population (31 December 2022)
Italy	6,130
Turkey	5,945
Syria	1,854
Poland	1,660
Ukraine	1,573
Greece	1,370
Bulgaria	1,227
Morocco	1,093
Romania	971
Serbia	945

== Politics ==
=== Mayor ===
The people of Solingen have been able to elect a council and a mayor since 1374, the year the town was granted its charter. The mayor changed annually on 24 June. Solingen has had a mayor since 1896. During the Nazi era (1933–1945), the mayor was appointed by the NSDAP and not democratically elected by the people of Solingen.

After the Second World War, the military government of the British occupation zone appointed a Lord Mayor. From 1946, the Solingen City Council elected an honorary Lord Mayor and a full-time Lord Mayor from among its members. Until 1997, the honorary lord mayors had mainly representative functions, while the full-time lord mayors were the chief administrative officers of the city of Solingen. In 1997, the dual leadership of the city administration was abolished. Since then there has been only one full-time Lord Mayor. He is the chairman of the council, the head of the city administration and the first representative of the city. Since 1999, the Lord Mayor has been directly elected by the electorate in a secret ballot.

The current mayor of Solingen is Daniel Flemm of the Christian Democratic Union (CDU), elected in 2025.

Previous mayoral election was held on 13 September 2020, and the results were as follows:

Candidate	Party	Votes	%
Tim Kurzbach	Social Democratic Party	31,836	55.4
Carsten Heinrich Becker	Christian Democratic Union	15,776	27.4
Raoul Torben Brattig	Free Democratic Party	2,869	5.0
Andreas Lukisch	Alternative for Germany	2,499	4.3
Adrian Scheffels	The Left	2,172	3.8
Jan Michael Lange	Citizens' Association for Solingen	1,624	2.8
Arnold Falkowski	Free Citizens' Union	700	1.2
Valid votes		57,476	99.1
Invalid votes		523	0.9
Total		57,999	100.0
Electorate/voter turnout		126,301	45.9
Source: State Returning Officer

=== City council ===
Results of the 2020 city council election

The Solingen city council governs the city alongside the mayor. The most recent city council election was held on 13 September 2020, and the results were as follows:

Party	Votes	%	+/−	Seats	+/−
Christian Democratic Union (CDU)	17,326	30.2	▼3.9	16	▼1
Social Democratic Party (SPD)	16,229	28.3	▼1.3	15	±0
Alliance 90/The Greens (Grüne)	10,428	18.2	▲7.0	9	▲3
Free Democratic Party (FDP)	3,178	5.5	▲0.6	3	±0
Alternative for Germany (AfD)	2,892	5.0	▲2.1	3	▲1
The Left (Die Linke)	2,435	4.2	▼0.7	2	▼1
Citizens' Association for Solingen (BfS)	1,842	3.2	▼1.1	2	±0
Die PARTEI (PARTEI)	1,367	2.4	New	1	New
Alternative Citizens' Initiative (ABI)	635	1.1	New	1	New
Free Citizens' Union (FBU)	531	0.9	▼0.5	0	▼1
Solingen Active (Aktiv)	417	0.7	▼0.7	0	▼1
Independents	34	0.1	–	0	–
Valid votes	57,314	98.8			
Invalid votes	695	1.2			
Total	58,009	100.0		52	±0
Electorate/voter turnout	126,301	45.9	▲2.2		
Source: State Returning Officer

== Transport ==
=== Rail ===
Solingen Hauptbahnhof is served by Rhine-Ruhr S-Bahn line S1 from Düsseldorf and Düsseldorf Airport Station. S-Bahn line S7 links Solingen (including the station nearest the city centre, Solingen Mitte, and Solingen-Grünewald) to Wuppertal via Remscheid, Remscheid-Lennep and Wuppertal-Ronsdorf. This line is currently operated by RheinRuhrBahn, a subsidiary of Transdev Germany. The Rhein-Wupper-Bahn (RB 48) runs over the Gruiten–Köln-Deutz line to Bonn-Mehlem via Opladen and Cologne. It has been operated by National Express as of 13 December 2015. Starting 11 December 2022, an additional line RE47, running from Remscheid to Düsseldorf via Solingen has been established. This line is served by Regiobahn.

Railway stations of Solingen
Station	Lines served	Destinations	Notes
Solingen Hauptbahnhof	ICE42	Dortmund – Solingen – Mannheim – Munich (InterCity Express)	Interchange with Obus Solingen (trolleybus) lines 681, 682.
Solingen Hauptbahnhof	ICE43	Hannover – Solingen – Cologne – Mannheim – Basel (InterCity Express)	Interchange with Obus Solingen (trolleybus) lines 681, 682.
Solingen Hauptbahnhof	ICE91	Dortmund – Solingen – Frankfurt – Vienna (InterCity Express)	Interchange with Obus Solingen (trolleybus) lines 681, 682.
Solingen Hauptbahnhof	IC31	Hamburg – Solingen – Cologne – Frankfurt (InterCity)	Interchange with Obus Solingen (trolleybus) lines 681, 682.
Solingen Hauptbahnhof	IC55	Leipzig – Hannover – Solingen – Cologne	Interchange with Obus Solingen (trolleybus) lines 681, 682.
Solingen Hauptbahnhof	RE7	Krefeld – Cologne – Solingen – Wuppertal – Hagen – Hamm – Münster – Rheine (RegionalExpress)	Interchange with Obus Solingen (trolleybus) lines 681, 682.
Solingen Hauptbahnhof	RE47	Düsseldorf – Solingen – Remscheid – Remscheid Lennep	Interchange with Obus Solingen (trolleybus) lines 681, 682.
Solingen Hauptbahnhof	RB48	Wuppertal-Oberbarmen – Solingen – Cologne – Bonn-Mehlem (RegionalBahn)	Interchange with Obus Solingen (trolleybus) lines 681, 682.
Solingen Hauptbahnhof	S1	S-Bahn to Dortmund	Interchange with Obus Solingen (trolleybus) lines 681, 682.
Solingen Hauptbahnhof	S7	S-Bahn to Wuppertal via Remscheid	Interchange with Obus Solingen (trolleybus) lines 681, 682.
Solingen Mitte	S7	Nearest station to historic centre. Interchange with trolleybus lines 681, 683, 684, 686.	
Solingen Mitte	RE47	Nearest station to historic centre. Interchange with trolleybus lines 681, 683, 684, 686.	
Solingen Grünewald	S7	Interchange with trolleybus line 682.	
Solingen Grünewald	RE47	Interchange with trolleybus line 682.	
Solingen Vogelpark	S1		
Solingen Schaberg	S7		

=== Trolleybus ===
Solingen has a trolleybus network, one of only three in Germany remaining besides Eberswalde and Esslingen am Neckar.

=== Air transport ===
The nearest airports are Düsseldorf Airport and Cologne Bonn Airport. Both airports can be reached by train from Solingen-Hauptbahnhof (change trains at Köln Messe/Deutz station for the S-Bahn 13 to Cologne Bonn Airport). Other easily reached airports are Frankfurt Airport (ICE train stop), Dortmund Airport (railway station "Holzwickede" on the RE7 trainline) and the low cost Weeze Airport (coaches from Düsseldorf Hauptbahnhof).

== Religion ==
=== Christianity ===
Solingen has belonged from its beginnings to the Roman Catholic Archdiocese of Cologne (Erzbistum Köln), and more specifically to the Archdeaconry of the Probst (provost) of St. Kunibert, the deanery of Deutz. For reasons that are unclear, the city has long been associated with St. Clement, the third Pope, symbols of whose martyrdom appear on the city’s shield. Although the Protestant Reformation gradually made gains in the city, which was under the control of the Counts of Berg, the population by and large remained Roman Catholic for a while. The Catholic community was newly endowed by the local lord in 1658 and in 1701 received a new church building. In 1827 Solingen became the seat of its own deanery within the newly defined Archdiocese of Cologne, to which the city's current parishes still belong.

As mentioned, the Reformation only gradually gained a foothold in Solingen. A reformed church affiliated with the Bergisch synod was established in 1590, and the city's parish church became reformed in 1649. Lutherans had been present in Solingen since the beginning of the 17th century, and a Lutheran congregation was founded in 1635. In 1672 a formalized religious agreement was reached between the city's religious groups. The Reformation was also introduced in Gräfrath in 1590, where a church council was apparently established in 1629. The Reformed and Lutheran churches were formed into a united church community in 1838 following the general merger of Reformed and Lutheran churches in Prussia in 1817.

The Protestant parishes originally belonged to the district synod of Lennep, today part of the city Remscheid. A new synod was established in Solingen in 1843, and the city acquired its own superintendent, a form of church administrator. This formed the basis for the present-day Church District of Solingen, a member of the Evangelical Church in the Rhineland. With the exception of the free churches, most Protestant churches belong to the Church District of Solingen.

Today approximately 34% of Solingen's population belongs to Protestant churches, and roughly 26% belong to Catholic churches. Other church communities in Solingen include Greek Orthodox, Evangelical Free (including Baptist and Brethren), Methodist, Seventh-day Adventist, Pentecostal, Salvation Army, and free churches. The Church of Jesus Christ of Latter-day Saints, Jehovah's Witnesses and the New Apostolic Church also have communities in Solingen.

=== Gallery ===
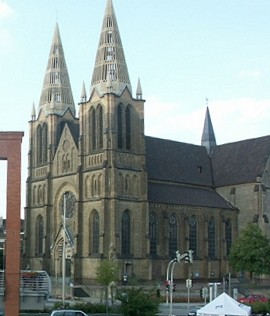
Catholic Church St. Clemens

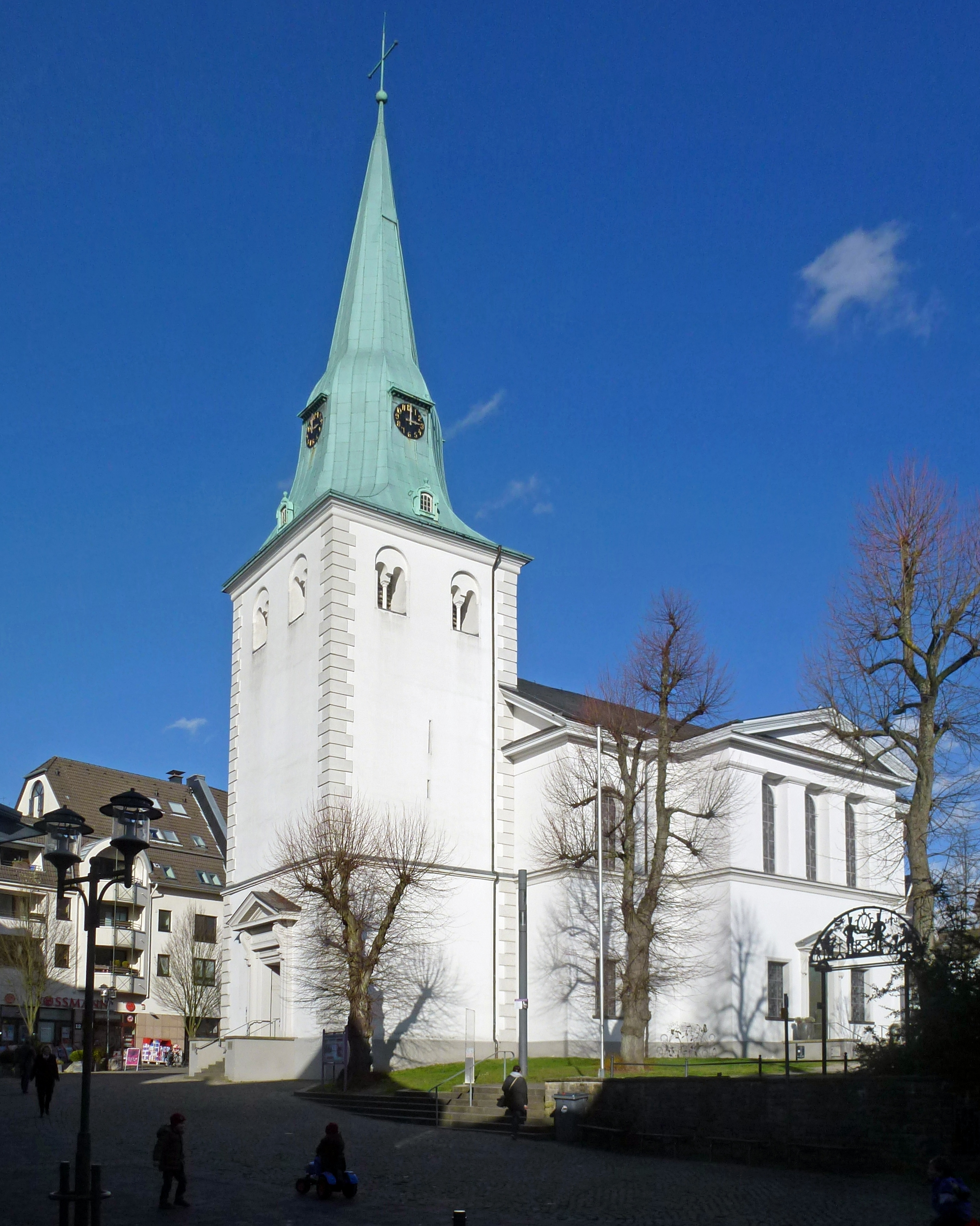
Protestant Church Wald

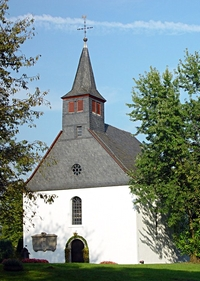
Protestant Chapel of St. Reinoldi in Rupelrath

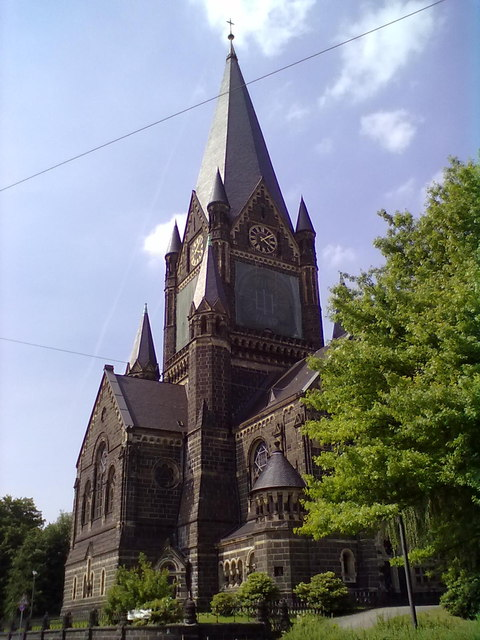
Martin-Luther-Church in Solingen-Mitte

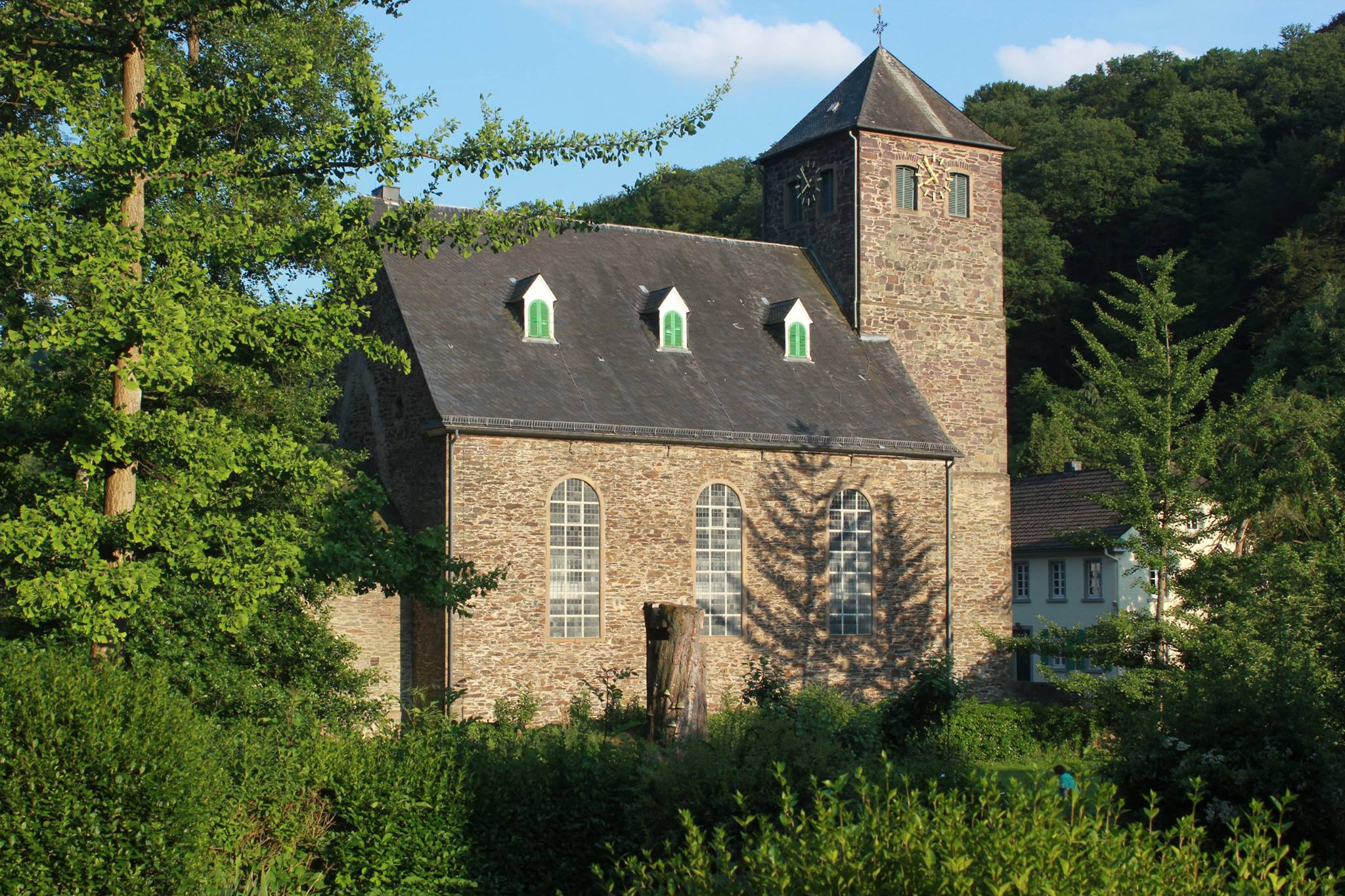
Protestant Church Burg

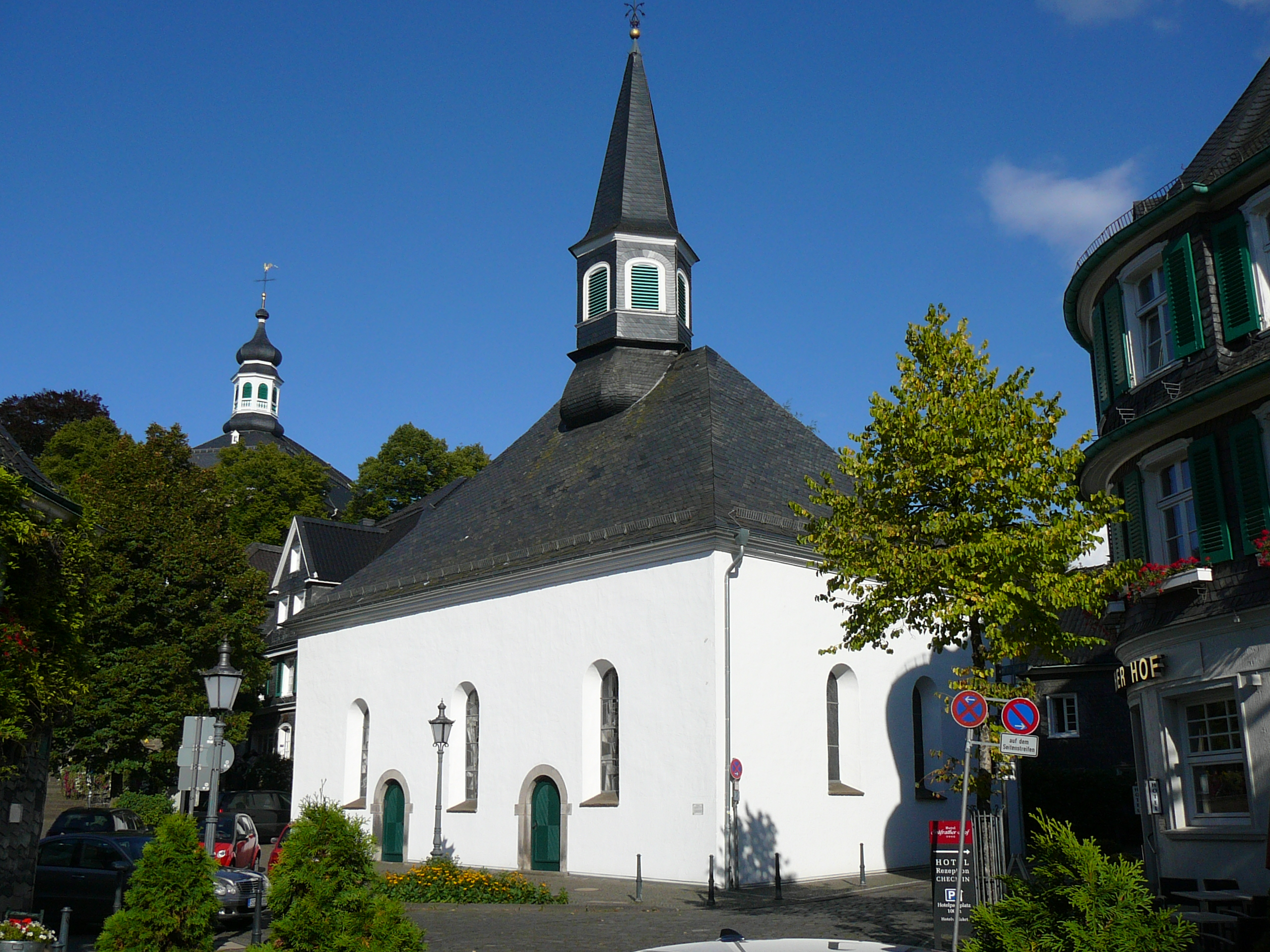
Protestant Church Gräfrath

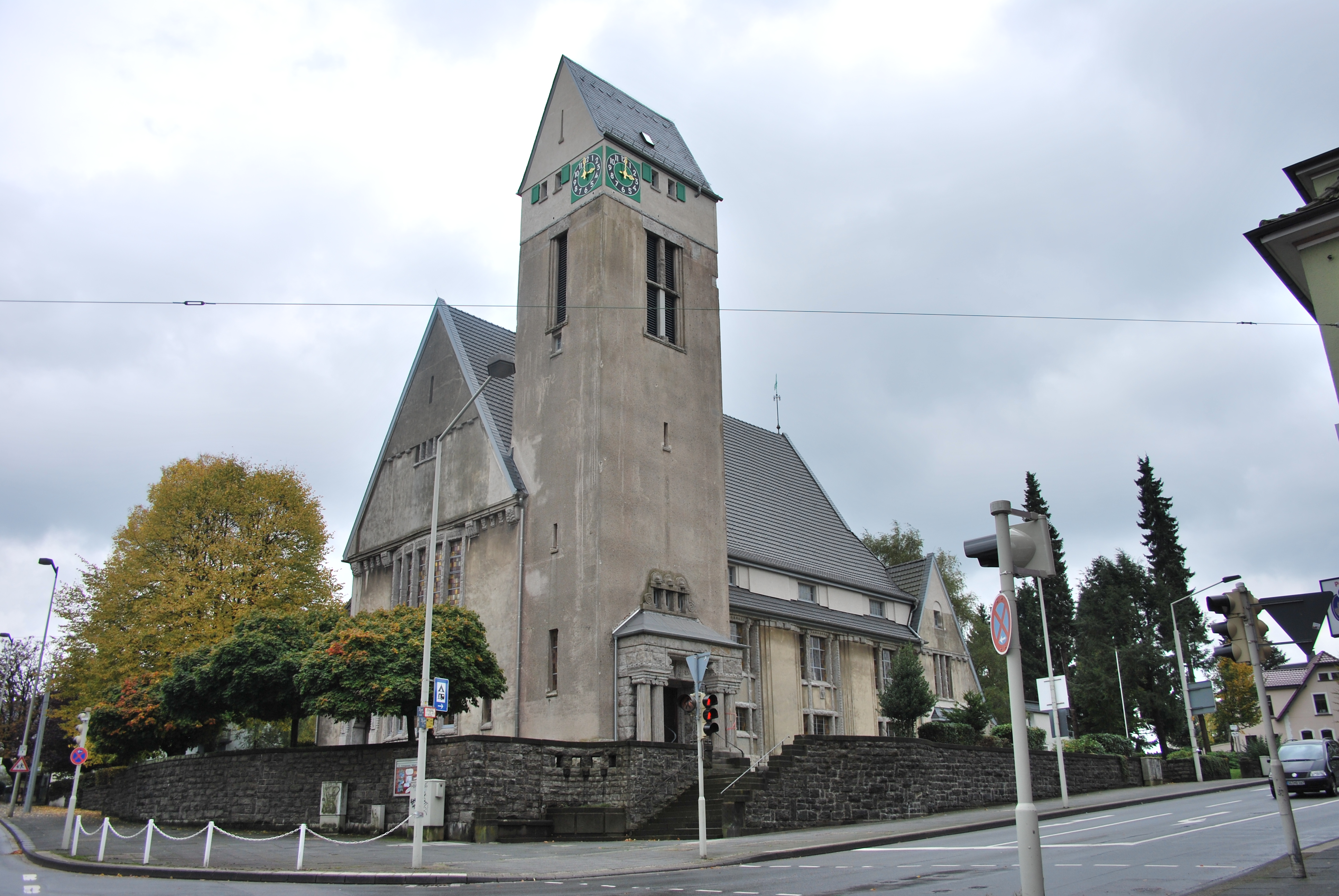
Protestant Church, Dorp

== Main sights ==
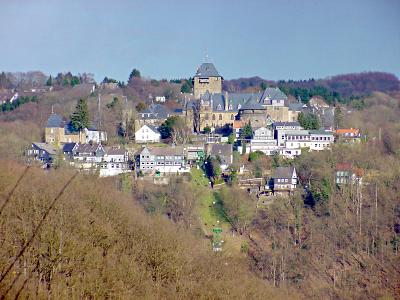
Burg Castle, Burg-on-Wupper

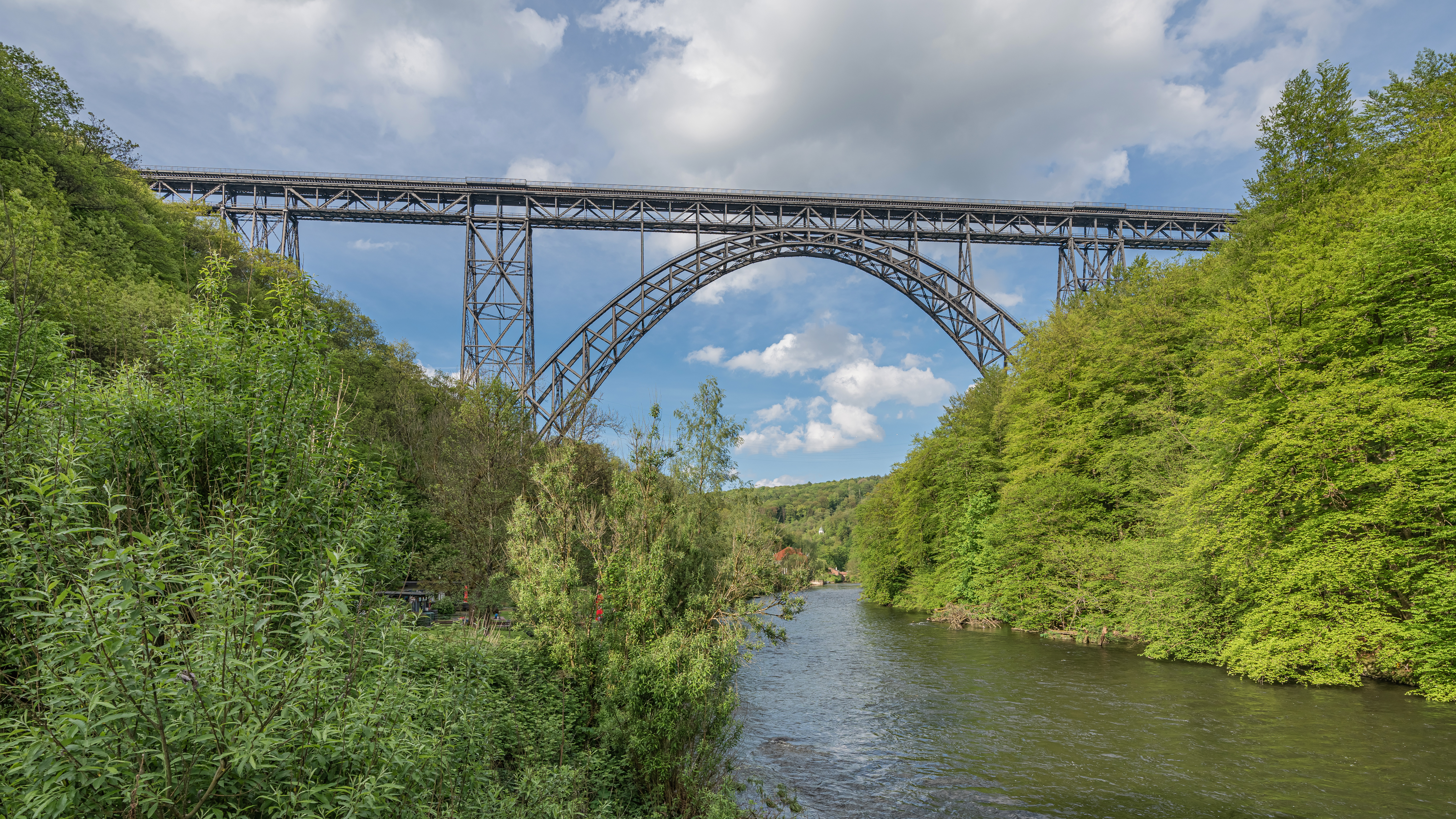
Müngsten Bridge

- Burg Castle, the castle of the counts of Berg
- Müngsten Bridge, a railway bridge connecting Solingen with the neighbouring town of Remscheid. Standing at 107 m above the ground, it is the tallest railway bridge in Germany. It was constructed in 1897 and originally named the Kaiser-Wilhelm-Brücke after Wilhelm I
- Klosterkirche, former convent church (1690)

=== Museums ===
- Rhineland Industrial Museum Hendrichs Drop Forge, an Anchor Point of ERIH, The European Route of Industrial Heritage
- German Blade Museum, presenting swords and cutlery of all epochs
- Art Museum Solingen (Museum of Art)
- Museum Plagiarius, the Plagiarius exhibition shows more than 350 product units – i.e., original products and their brazen plagiarisms – in direct comparison. The registered society conducts an annual competition that awards the anti-prize "Plagiarius" to those manufacturers and distributors that a jury of peers have found guilty of making or selling "the most flagrant" imitations.
- Laurel and Hardy Museum
- Zentrum für verfolgte Künste (Center for Persecuted Arts)

=== Parks and gardens ===
- Botanischer Garten Solingen, a botanical garden
- Bärenloch
- Walder Stadtpark in Solingen-Wald
- Gustav-Coppel-Park
- Süd-Park
- Brückenpark beneath the Müngsten Bridge

== Sports ==
=== American football ===
The Solingen Paladins is an American football club which was founded in 2006.

=== Association football ===
Until its bankruptcy in 1990, SG Union Solingen was the main club, playing at the Stadion am Hermann-Löns-Weg.

=== Baseball ===
The Solingen Alligators are a baseball and softball club from Solingen. The club was founded in 1991 and the first men's team was promoted to the first division of the Baseball Bundesliga for the 2003 season. It has played there in every season since, winning the league championship in 2006 and 2014. The club claims over 250 members.

=== Chess ===
The Schachgesellschaft Solingen e.V. 1868 is best known for its chess team, which plays in the Schachbundesliga (Chess Bundesliga), the top tier of the German chess league system, and is the most successful club in German chess history, having won a record 12 national titles (1969, 1971, 1972, 1973, 1974, 1975, 1980, 1980/81, 1986/87, 1987/88, 1996/97 and 2015/16), three national cups (1986, 2006 und 2009) and 2 European cups (1976 and 1990).

=== Handball ===
In handball, Solingen's most successful team is Bergischer HC, playing in the top-tier Handball-Bundesliga which they were promoted to for the second time in 2013, reaching 15th place in the 2013–14 campaign and therefore staying in the top flight for a second consecutive season. BHC originates from a 2006 cooperation between the SG Solingen and rivals LTV Wuppertal from the nearby city of the same name. The club advertises itself as a representative of the entire Bergisches Land region. The team plays its home games at both Solingen's Klingenhalle (2,600 seats) and Wuppertal's Uni-Halle (3,200 seats).

== Reception ==
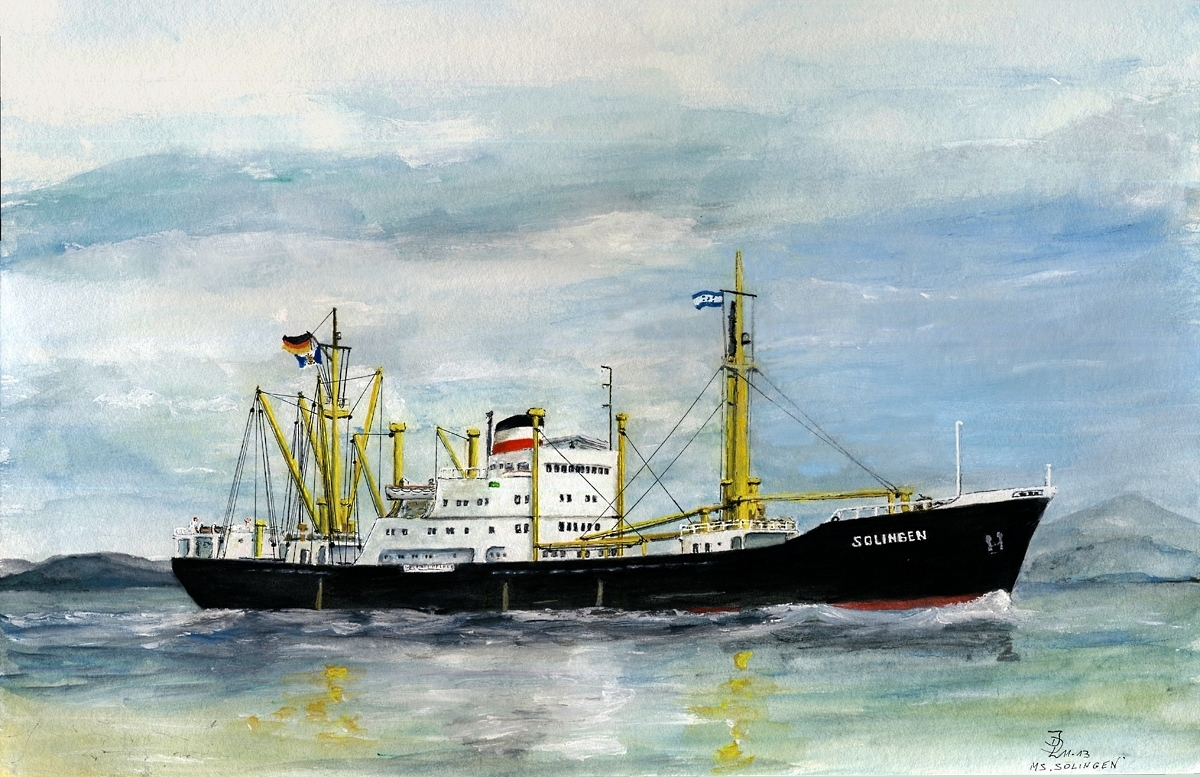
The cargo ship Solingen in 1966

In May 1955, the city of Solingen took over the partnership of the German general cargo ship Solingen of the Hamburg-American Packet Transit Actien-Gesellschaft (Hapag).

== Twin towns – sister cities ==
Solingen is twinned with:

- Gouda, Netherlands (1957)
- Chalon-sur-Saône, France (1960)
- Blyth, England, United Kingdom (1962)
- Jinotega, Nicaragua (1985)
- Ness Ziona, Israel (1986)
- Thiès, Senegal (1990)
- Aue, Germany (1990)

Since 1990, Solingen also sponsors Złotoryja County in Poland.

== Notable people ==
- Johann Wilhelm Meigen (1764–1845), entomologist
- J. C. C. Devaranne (1784–1813), helped to lead resistance against Napoleonic occupation in 1813
- Karl Mager (1810–1858), school educator and school politician
- Karl Adams (1811–1849), mathematician and teacher
- Adolf Kamphausen (1829–1909), biblical scholar
- Albert Bierstadt (1830–1902), landscape painter
- Carl Klönne (1850–1915), banker
- Ernst Otto Beckmann (1853–1923), chemist
- Ludwig Woltmann (1871–1907), anthropologist, zoologist and neo-Kantian
- Artur Möller van den Bruck (1876–1925), writer
- Albert Müller (1891–1954), communist and politician
- Paul Voss (1894–1976), designer
- Paul Franken (1894–1944), socialist politician, victim of Stalinism
- Karl Allmenröder (1896–1917), fighter pilot
- Erwin Bowien (1899–1972), painter and writer
- Hermann Friedrich Graebe (1900–1986), manager and engineer, 'Righteous Among the Nations' by Israel
- Josef Dahmen (1903–1985), actor
- Adolf Eichmann (1906–1962), major organiser of the Holocaust
- Georg Meistermann (1911–1990), painter of sacred and secular glass windows
- Jürgen Thorwald (1915–2006), writer, journalist and historian
- Christel Rupke (1919–1998), swimmer
- Walter Scheel (1919–2016), politician (FDP), the 4th President of Germany (1974–1979)
- Aenne Franz (1923-2023), dialect writer
- Bettina Heinen-Ayech (1937–2020), painter and publicist
- Klaus Lehnertz (1938–2026), pole vaulter
- Adolf Weil (1938–2011), motocross rider
- Christoph Wolff (born 1940), musicologist
- Pina Bausch (1940–2009), dancer and choreographer
- Ulay (1943–2020), artist
- Wolfgang Schwerk (born 1955), ultramarathon runner
- Timotheus Höttges (born 1962), CEO of Deutsche Telekom
- Richard David Precht (born 1964), philosopher, writer and publicist
- Veronica Ferres (born 1965), actress
- Sebastian Thrun (born 1967), entrepreneur, educator and computer scientist
- Jens Weidmann (born 1968), President of Deutsche Bundesbank
- Mola Adebisi (born 1973), TV-presenter
- Marco Matias (born 1975), German-Portuguese singer
- Fahriye Evcen (born 1986), actress
- Kevin Kampl (born 1990), Slovenian footballer
- Christoph Kramer (born 1991), footballer

The founders of Studebaker Brothers Manufacturing Company, which later became the automobile company Studebaker, trace their lineage to bladesmen from the region who emigrated to America in 1736.
