= Lochbach (Itter) =

River in Germany

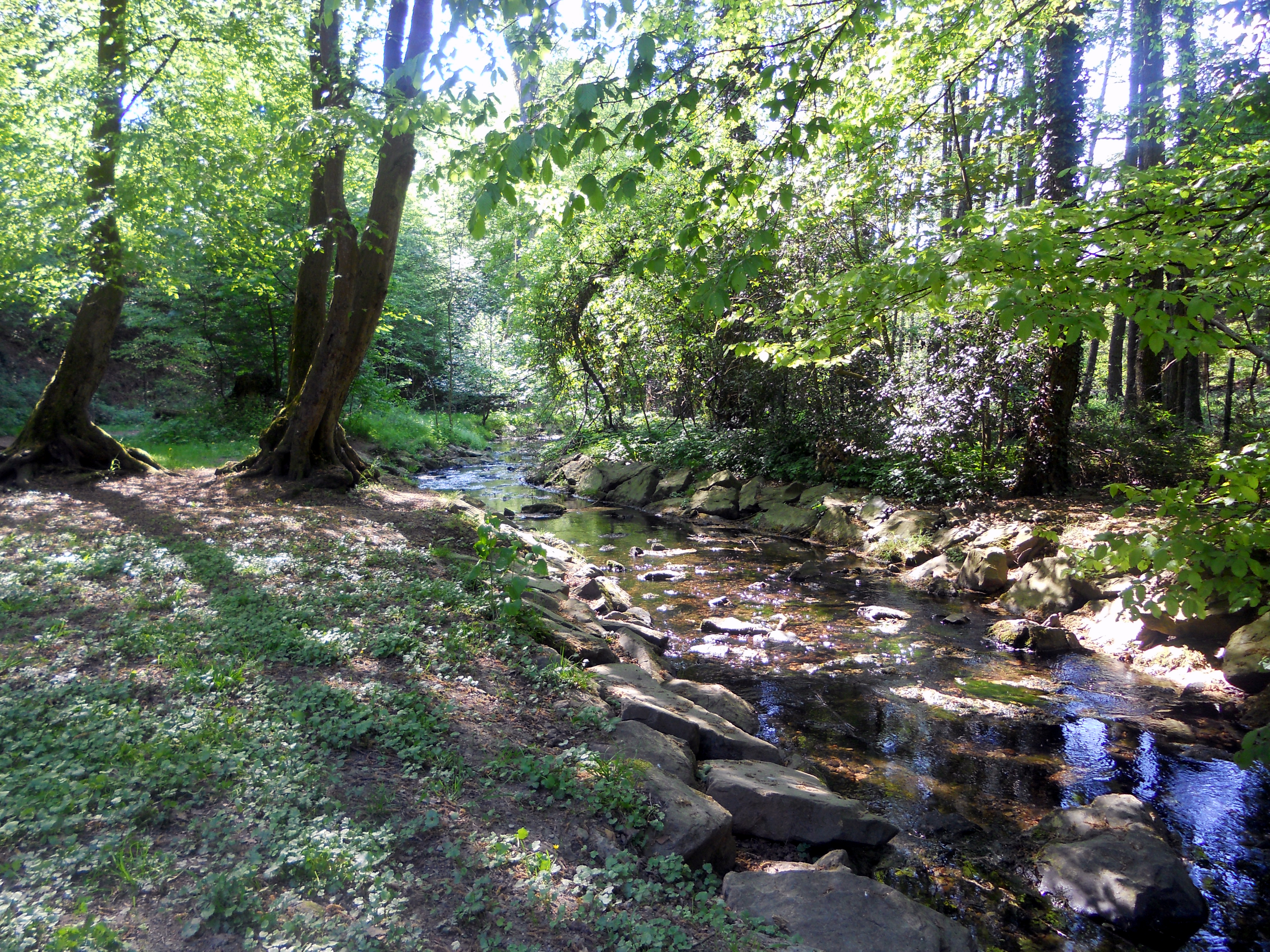
- Lochbach valley in Solingen, Germany.

Location
- Country: Germany
- State: North Rhine-Westphalia

Physical characteristics
- Mouth
  - location: Itter
  - coordinates: 51.1733°N 6.9870°E
  - elevation: 108 m (354 ft)
- Length: 7.93 km (4.93 mi)

Basin features
- Progression: Itter→ Rhine→ North Sea

Lochbach is a river of North Rhine-Westphalia, Germany.

The origin of the Lochbach are a couple of sources near Gräfrath, municipal district of Solingen. The Lochbach flows in Ohligs, another municipal district of Solingen, into the Itter.

The Lochbach valley is famous for eleven traditional water powered groundwood mills which are typical for the Bergisches Land.

== See also ==
- List of rivers of North Rhine-Westphalia
