= Lochbach =

Lochbach may refer to:

- Lochbach (Itter), a river of North Rhine-Westphalia, Germany
- a tributary of the Wyna (river), Switzerland
