= Probst =

For the ecclesiastical title, see Propst (German) or Provost (English).

Probst is a surname. Notable people with the surname include:

- Adalbert Probst (1900–1934), head of the Catholic Youth Sports Association
- Albert Probst (1931–2015), German politician
- Alfred Probst (1894-1958), Swiss rower
- Anneliese Probst (1926-2011), German writer
- Anton Probst, German Paralympic volleyball player
- Barbara Probst (born 1964), German contemporary artist
- Barbara Probst Solomon (1928-2019), American journalist
- Christoph Probst (1919–1943), member of the German White Rose resistance organization
- Dominique Probst (born 1954), French composer
- Eberhard Probst (1955-2024), German wrestler
- Edward Probst (born in approximately 1858), chairman of the Shanghai Municipal Council
- Emil Probst (1877-1950), Engineer and academic
- Erich Probst (1927-1988), Austrian footballer
- Eva Probst (1930–2018), German actress
- Federico Probst (born 1905), Argentine rower
- Jason Probst, American politician member of the Kansas House of Representatives
- Jeff Probst (born 1962), American television personality
- Joseph Probst (1911-1997), Luxembourgish painter
- Karl Probst (1883-1963), American automotive pioneer
- Karl Probst (figure staker), German former pair skater
- Kim Probst (born 1981), American synchronized swimmer
- Larry Probst (born 1950), American businessman
- Maria Probst (1902-1967), German politician
- Marius Probst (born 1995), German middle-distance runner
- Michael Probst (born 1962), German former footballer
- Moritz Probst (1838-1916), Swiss civil engineer
- Moriz Probst (1867-1923), Austrian psychiatrist and neuroanatomist
- Netty Probst (1903-1990), Luxembourgish lawyer
- Oliver Matthias Probst Oleszewski, researcher and professor specializing
- Oswald Probst (1935-2015), Austrian archer
- Otto Probst (1911-1978), Austrian political activist
- Paul Probst (Disambiguation)
- Pierre Probst (1913–2007), French cartoonist
- Raymond Probst (1919-2001), Swiss jurist and diplomat
- Reinhart Probst (born 1957), German tennis player
- Rupert Probst (born 1981), Austrian cyclist
- Tarah Probst (Born In East Stroudsburg, Pennsylvania), American politician member of the Pennsylvania House of Representatives
- Tim Probst, American politician from Washington
- Walter Probst (1928-2007), Austrian footballer and manager
- Wiltrud Probst (born 1969), German tennis player
