= Common marigold =

Common marigold is a common name for several plants in the family Asteraceae cultivated as ornamentals for their large, generally orange blossoms.

Common marigold may refer to:

- Calendula officinalis, a species native to Europe, but cultivated worldwide
- Tagetes, a genus of plants native to the New World, but cultivated worldwide
