= Gräfrath =

Coordinates: 51°12′N 07°05′E

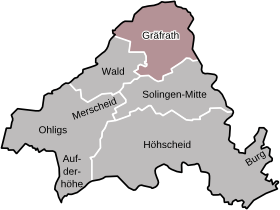
Locator map of Gräfrath in Solingen

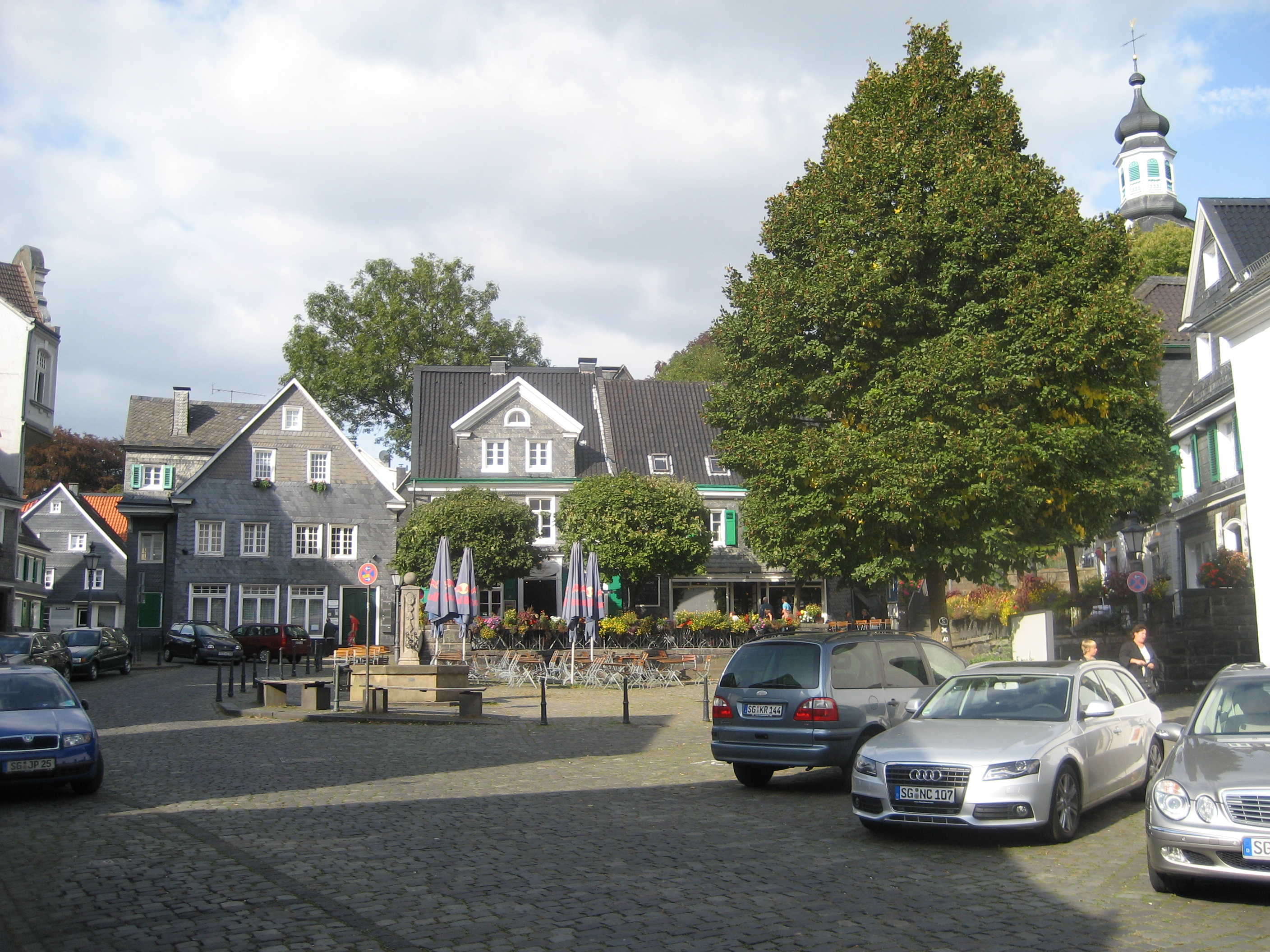
Historical market place in the borough of Gräfrath

Gräfrath or Graefrath is a district of Solingen in the German federal state of North Rhine-Westphalia, about 23 kilometres (14 mi) east of Düsseldorf.

== History ==
There was an abbey in Gräfrath from 1185 to 1803. In the past, iron, steel, and weaving were important economic activities.
