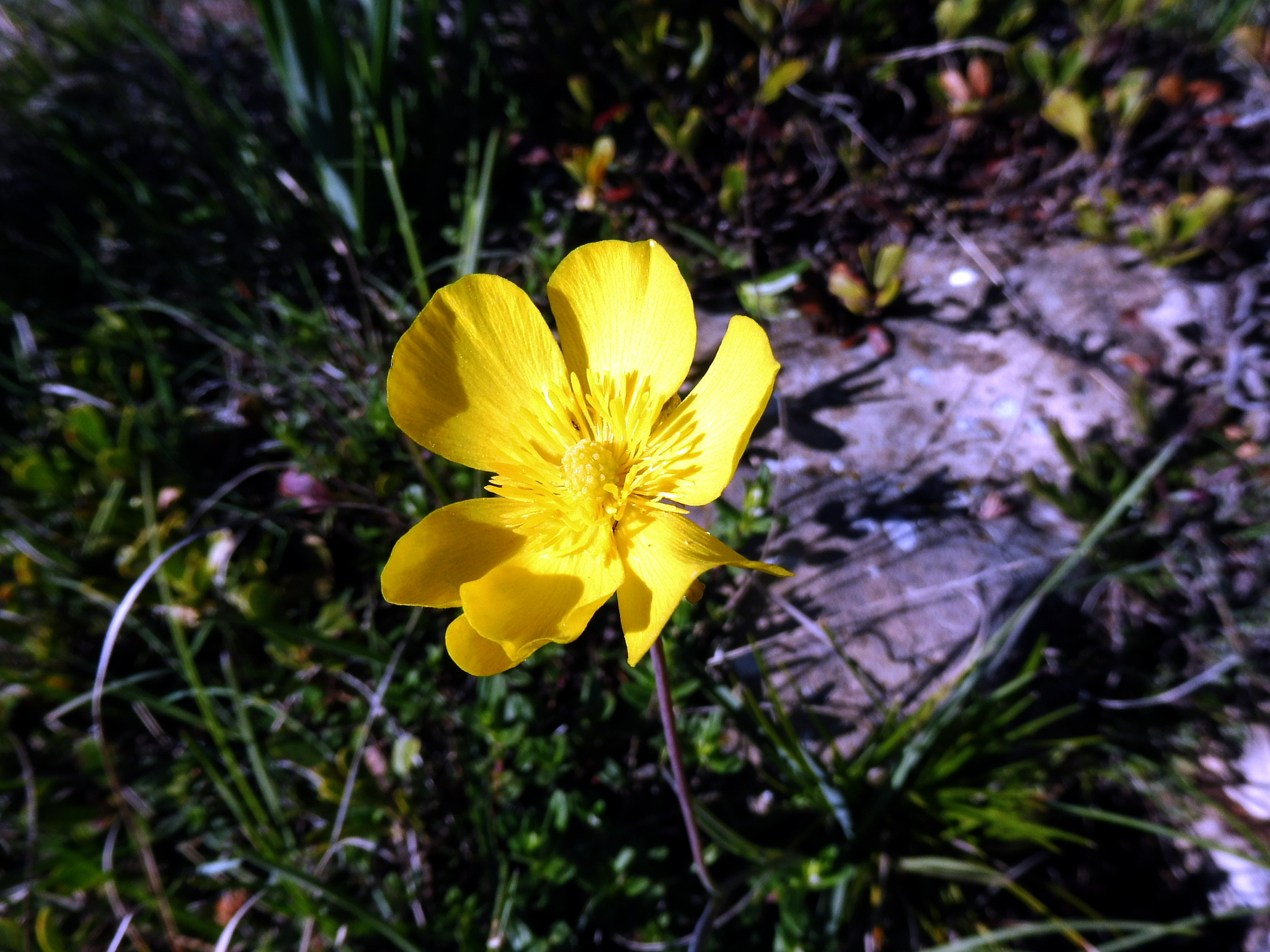
- Close-up of flower
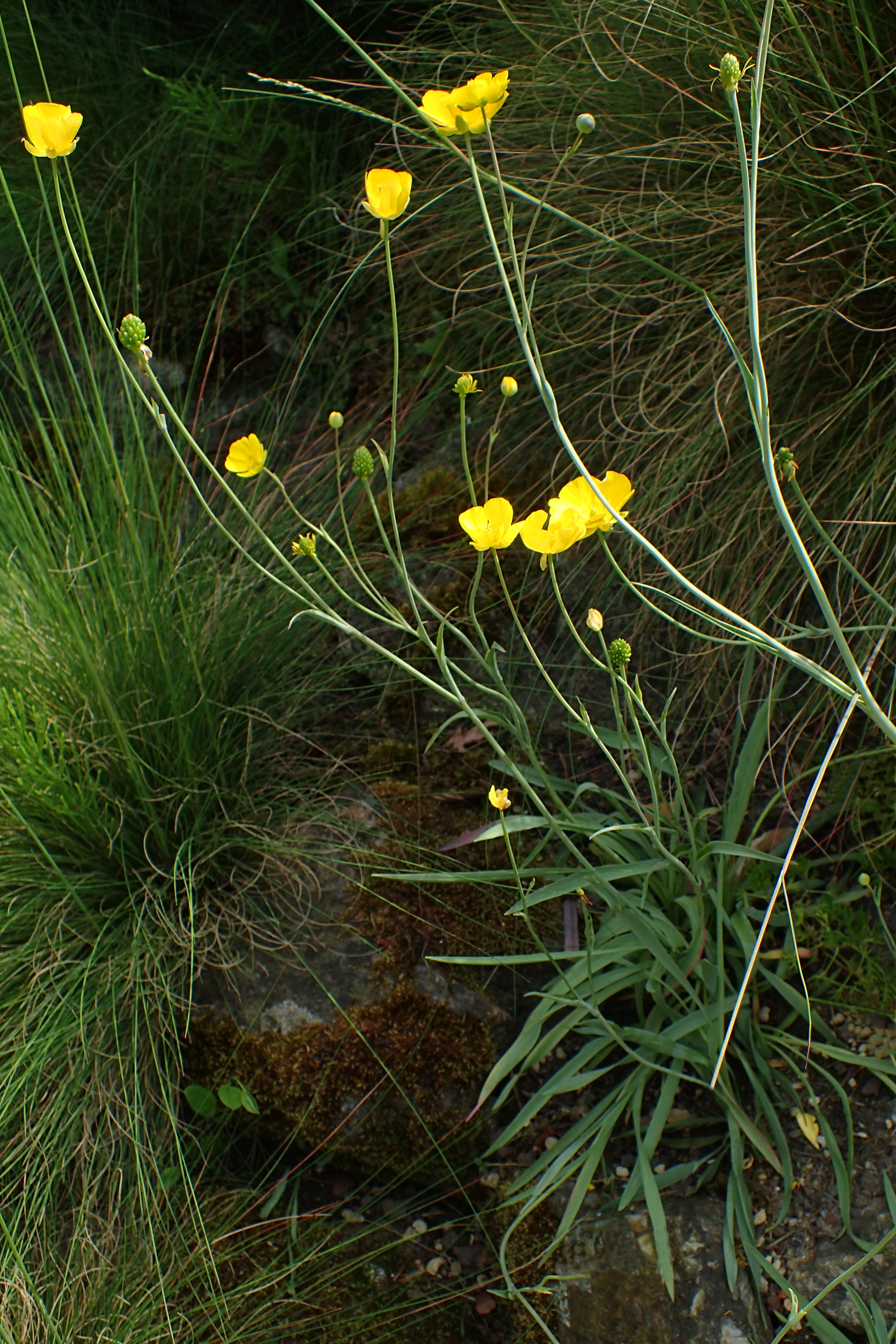
- Habit

Scientific classification
- Kingdom: Plantae
- Clade: Tracheophytes
- Clade: Angiosperms
- Clade: Eudicots
- Order: Ranunculales
- Family: Ranunculaceae
- Genus: Ranunculus
- Species: R. gramineus

Binomial name
- Ranunculus gramineus L.

Synonyms
- List: Ranunculus graminifolius Salisb.; Ranunculus luzulifolius (Boiss.) Amo; Xerodera graminea (L.) Fourr.

= Ranunculus gramineus =

Species of flowering plant

Ranunculus gramineus, called the grass-leaved buttercup, is a species of flowering plant in the genus Ranunculus, native to the western Mediterranean; Morocco, Algeria, Tunisia, Portugal, Spain, France, Italy (including Sardinia), and Switzerland. It has gained the Royal Horticultural Society's Award of Garden Merit.
