= Itter (Rhine) =

River of North Rhine-Westphalia, Germany

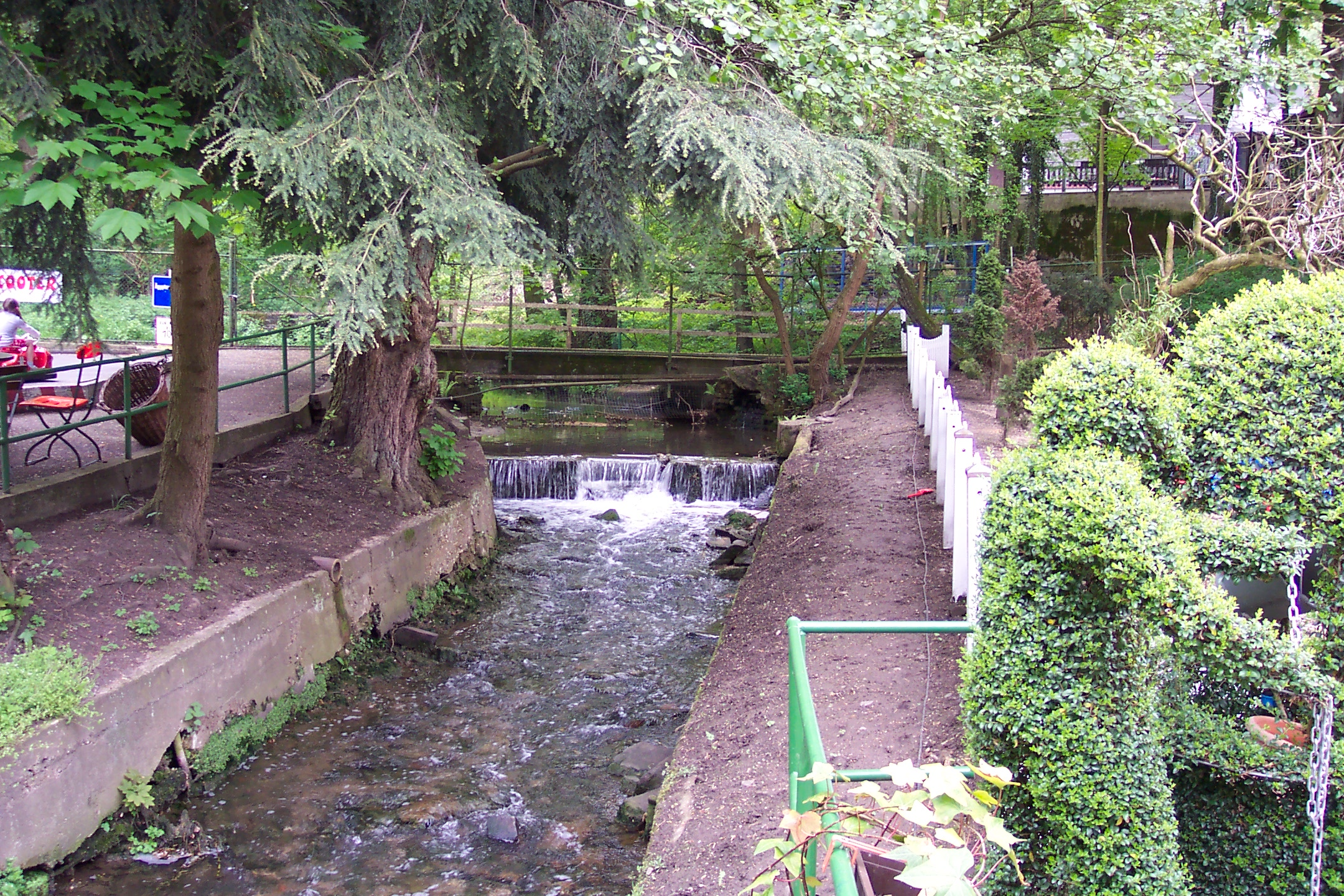

Location
- Country: Germany
- State: North Rhine-Westphalia

Physical characteristics
- Mouth
  - location: Rhine
  - coordinates: 51.1551°N 6.8599°E
- Length: 20.1 km (12.5 mi)

Basin features
- Progression: Rhine→ North Sea

Itter (German pronunciation: [ˈɪtɐ]) is a river of North Rhine-Westphalia, Germany. It is a right tributary of the Rhine in Benrath.

== See also ==
- List of rivers of North Rhine-Westphalia
