= Paul Probst =

Paul Probst may refer to:

- Paul Probst (ice hockey) (born 1950), Swiss ice hockey player
- Paul Probst (sport shooter) (1869–1945), Swiss sport shooter and Olympian
