= Mielno (disambiguation) =

Mielno is a Baltic coastal resort in West Pomeranian Voivodeship, Poland.

Mielno may also refer to:

- Mielno, Inowrocław County in Kuyavian-Pomeranian Voivodeship (north-central Poland)
- Mielno, Włocławek County in Kuyavian-Pomeranian Voivodeship (north-central Poland)
- Mielno, Mogilno County in Kuyavian-Pomeranian Voivodeship (north-central Poland)
- Mielno, Gniezno County in Greater Poland Voivodeship (west-central Poland)
- Mielno, Konin County in Greater Poland Voivodeship (west-central Poland)
- Mielno, Poznań County in Greater Poland Voivodeship (west-central Poland)
- Mielno, Szamotuły County in Greater Poland Voivodeship (west-central Poland)
- Mielno, Bytów County in Pomeranian Voivodeship (north Poland)
- Mielno, Gmina Gubin, Krosno County in Lubusz Voivodeship (west Poland)
- Mielno, Zielona Góra County in Lubusz Voivodeship (west Poland)
- Mielno, Żary County in Lubusz Voivodeship (west Poland)
- Mielno, Słupsk County in Pomeranian Voivodeship (north Poland)
- Mielno, Warmian-Masurian Voivodeship (north Poland)
- Mielno, Łobez County in West Pomeranian Voivodeship (north-west Poland)
