= Solaris Trollino =

Trolleybus series

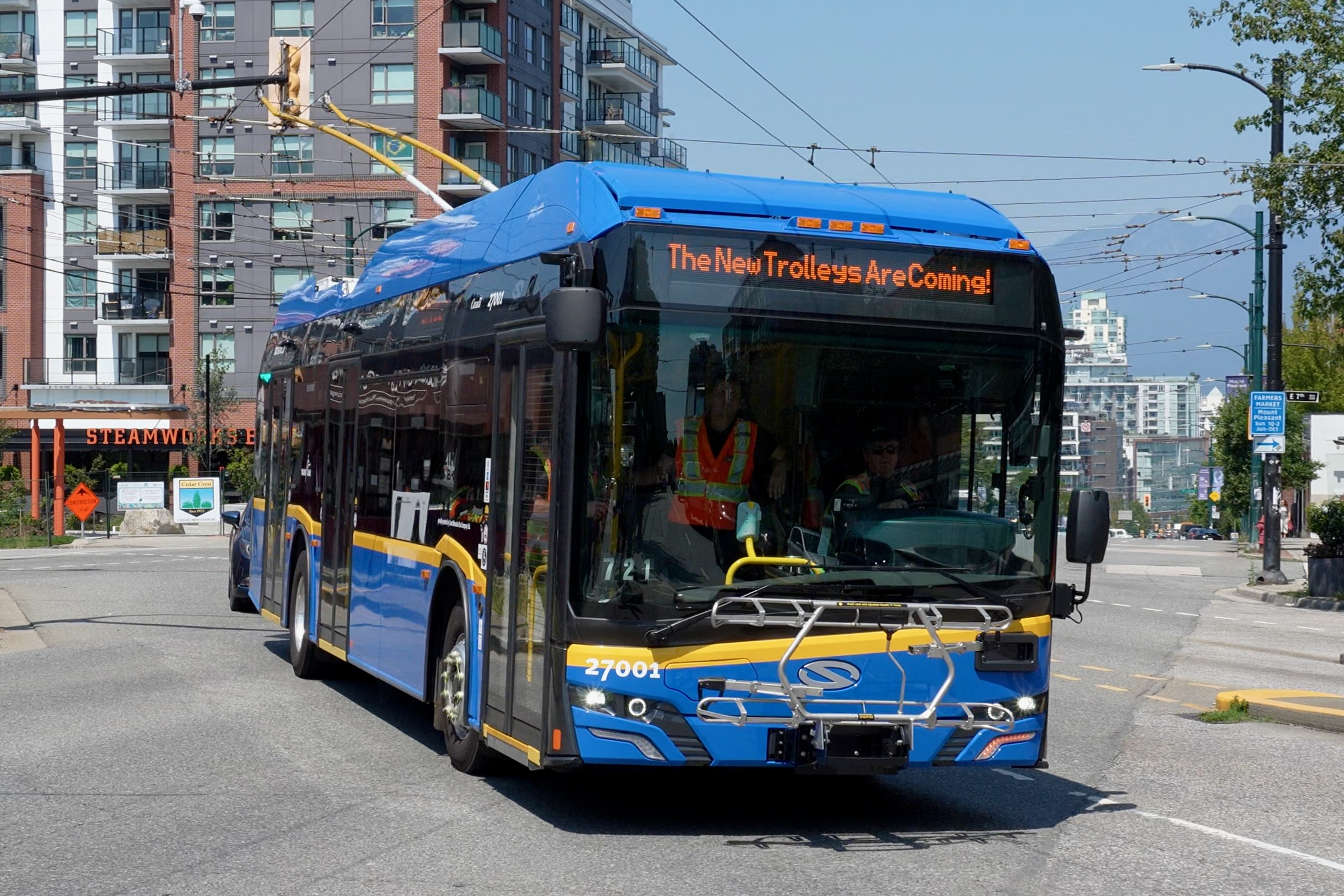
- Solaris Trollino 12 4th generation in Vancouver

Overview
- Manufacturer: Solaris Bus & Coach
- Also called: Škoda 26Tr, Škoda 27Tr, Škoda 28Tr, Škoda-Solaris 24M
- Production: 2002-present
- Assembly: Bolechowo-Osiedle, Poland

Body and chassis
- Class: Single-deck trolleybus
- Doors: 2-5 doors
- Floor type: Low floor

Powertrain
- Power output: 160–320 kW (214.6–429.1 hp)

Dimensions
- Length: 12,000–18,750 mm (472.4–738.2 in)
- Width: 2,550 mm (100.4 in)
- Height: 3,450 mm (135.8 in)
- Curb weight: 11,400–18,500 kg (25,132.7–40,785.5 lb)

Solaris Trollino is a series of low-floor trolleybuses designed for public transport, produced since 1999 by the Polish company Solaris Bus & Coach. The power regulation electronics and traction motors are delivered by other companies, such as Škoda Electric, Kiepe Electric, Medcom or Cegelec.

Solaris Trollino trolleybuses are structurally based on city buses from the Solaris Urbino family, while the production of the electric drive is handled by external manufacturers. Solaris cooperates with the companies Medcom, Vossloh Kiepe and Škoda Electric, and formerly also with the companies Cegelec, Ganz and Trobus. In addition, the Czech company Škoda Electric produces vehicles with its own drive, Škoda 26Tr Solaris and Škoda 27Tr Solaris, and formerly also Škoda 28Tr Solaris, based on Solaris trolleybuses. The vehicles can be equipped with an additional drive system, thanks to which they can cover the route without electric traction. These are an additional generator, traction batteries or a hydrogen fuel cell.

More than 1,800 units of Solaris Trollino trolleybuses were produced, which were delivered to more than 40 recipients in 17 European countries. In Poland, these are Gdynia, Lublin and Tychy. The list of cities in which Trollino trolleybuses operate includes Rome, Budapest, Sofia, Ostrava, Bucharest and Salzburg. In 2026, Solaris delivered the first of many Trollino trolleybuses to TransLink, serving Vancouver, British Columbia, marking the first Trollino trolleybus for a North American agency.

== Description and models ==
There are four different length variants (the number indicates length in meters):

- Solaris Trollino 12 (also sold as Škoda 26Tr Solaris)
- Solaris Trollino 15 (also sold as Škoda 28Tr Solaris) - no longer in production
- Solaris Trollino 18 (articulated, also sold as Škoda 27Tr Solaris)
- Solaris Trollino 24 (bi-articulated, also sold as Škoda-Solaris 24M)

Type	Number manufactured	Powertrain options
Solaris Trollino 12 / Škoda 26Tr Solaris	182 / 302	Škoda 160 kW, Kiepe 160 kW, MEDCOM 175 kW
Solaris Trollino 15 / Škoda 28Tr Solaris	49 / 35	Škoda 250 kW
Solaris Trollino 18 / Škoda 27Tr Solaris	114 / 260	Škoda 250 kW, Kiepe 2x160 kW, MEDCOM 250 kW
Solaris Trollino 24 / Škoda-Solaris 24M	1 / 36	Kiepe 2x160 kW

The trolleybuses can be fully dependent on wires, or they can be equipped with supercapacitors, batteries, fuel cells or diesel generators.

== Gallery ==
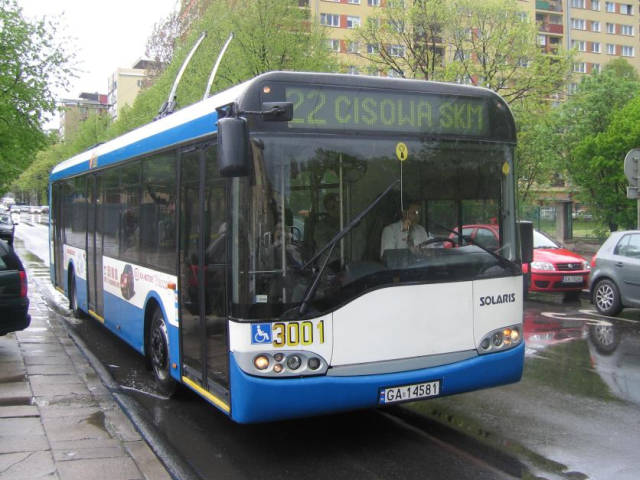
Prototype Solaris Trollino 12

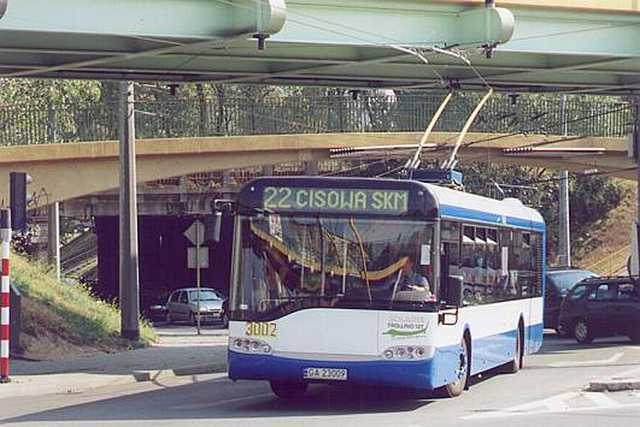
Solaris Trollino 12 of I generation

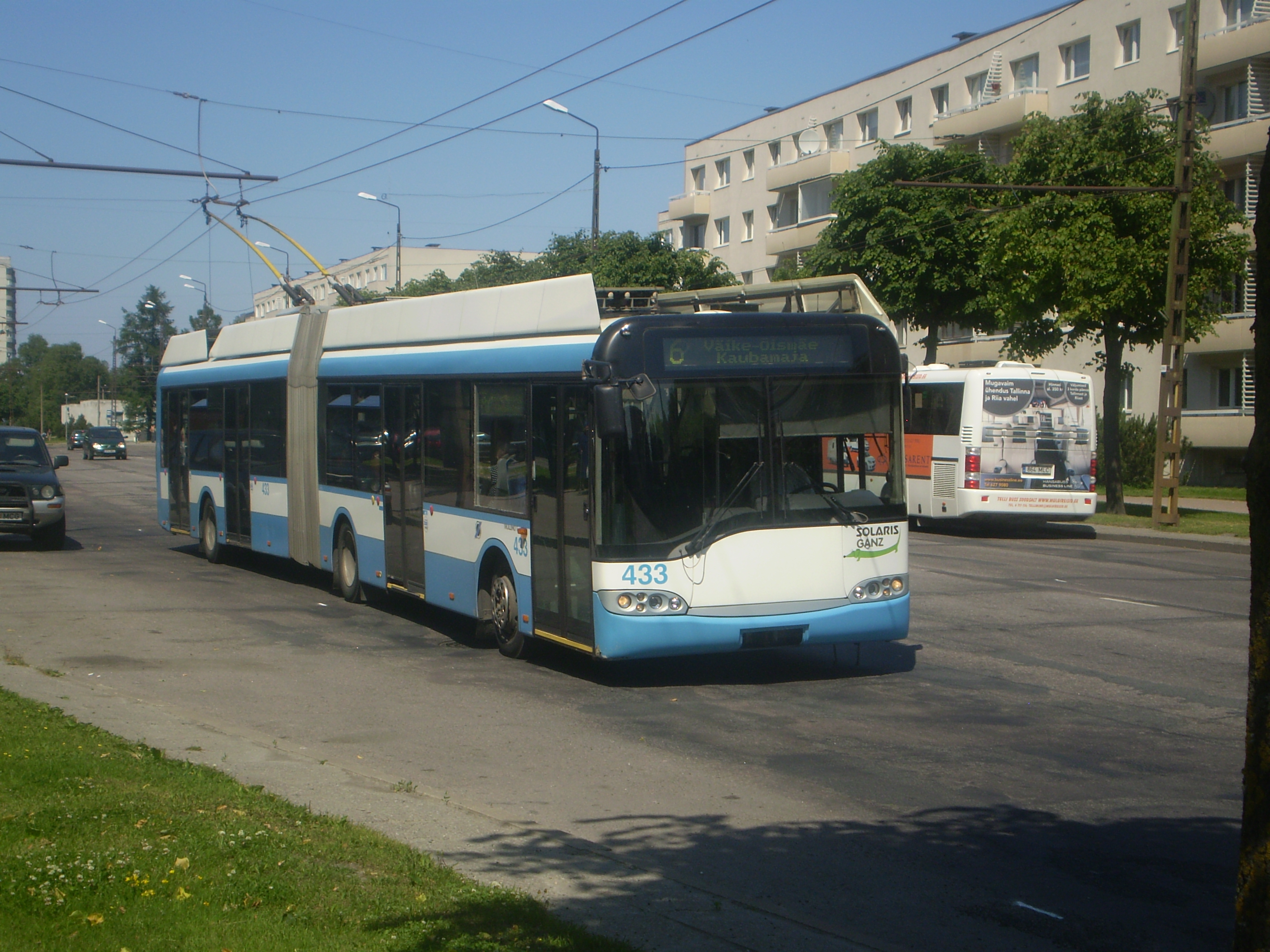
Solaris-Ganz Trollino of I generation

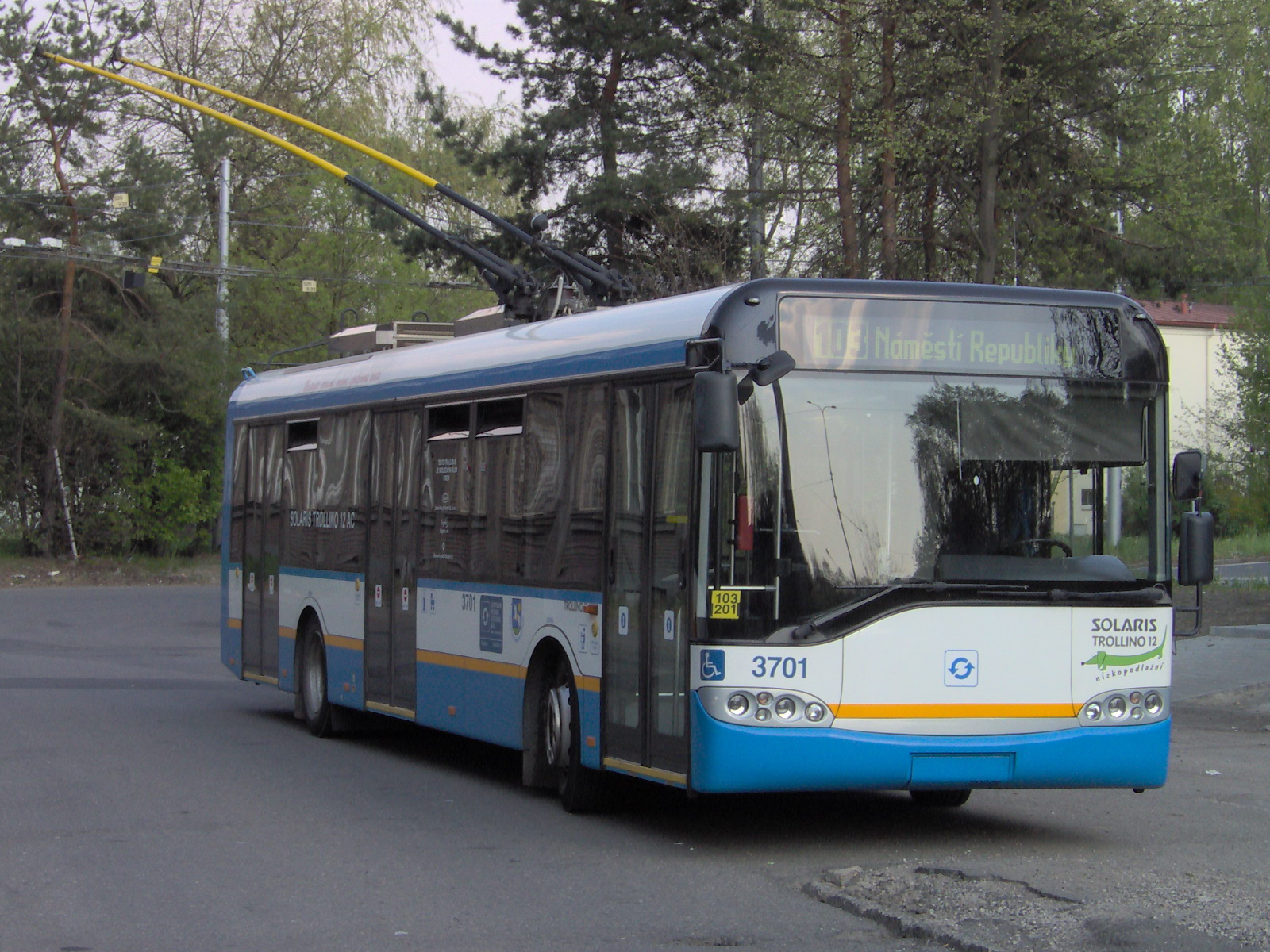
Solaris Trollino 12 of II generation

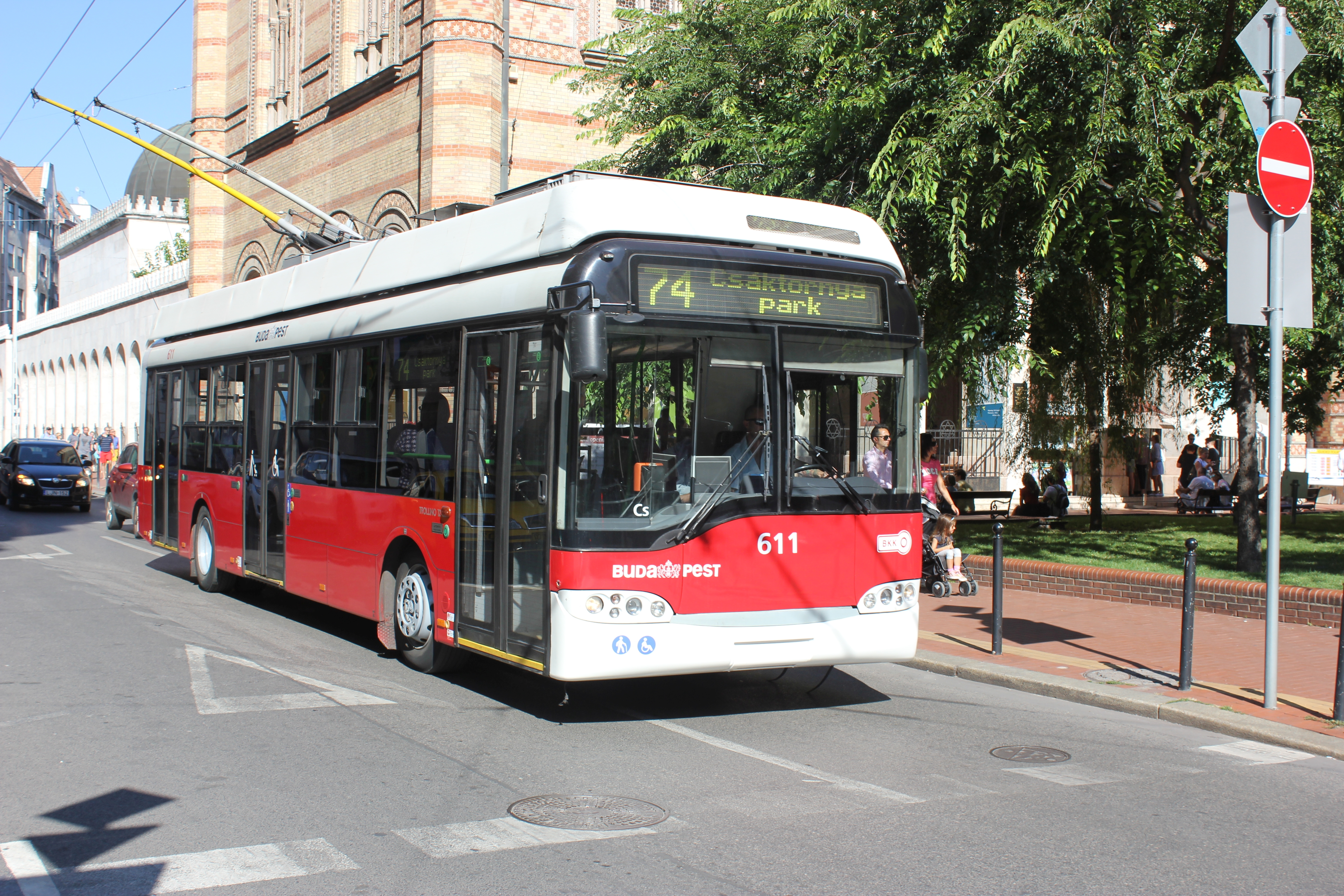
Solaris-Ganz Trollino of II generation

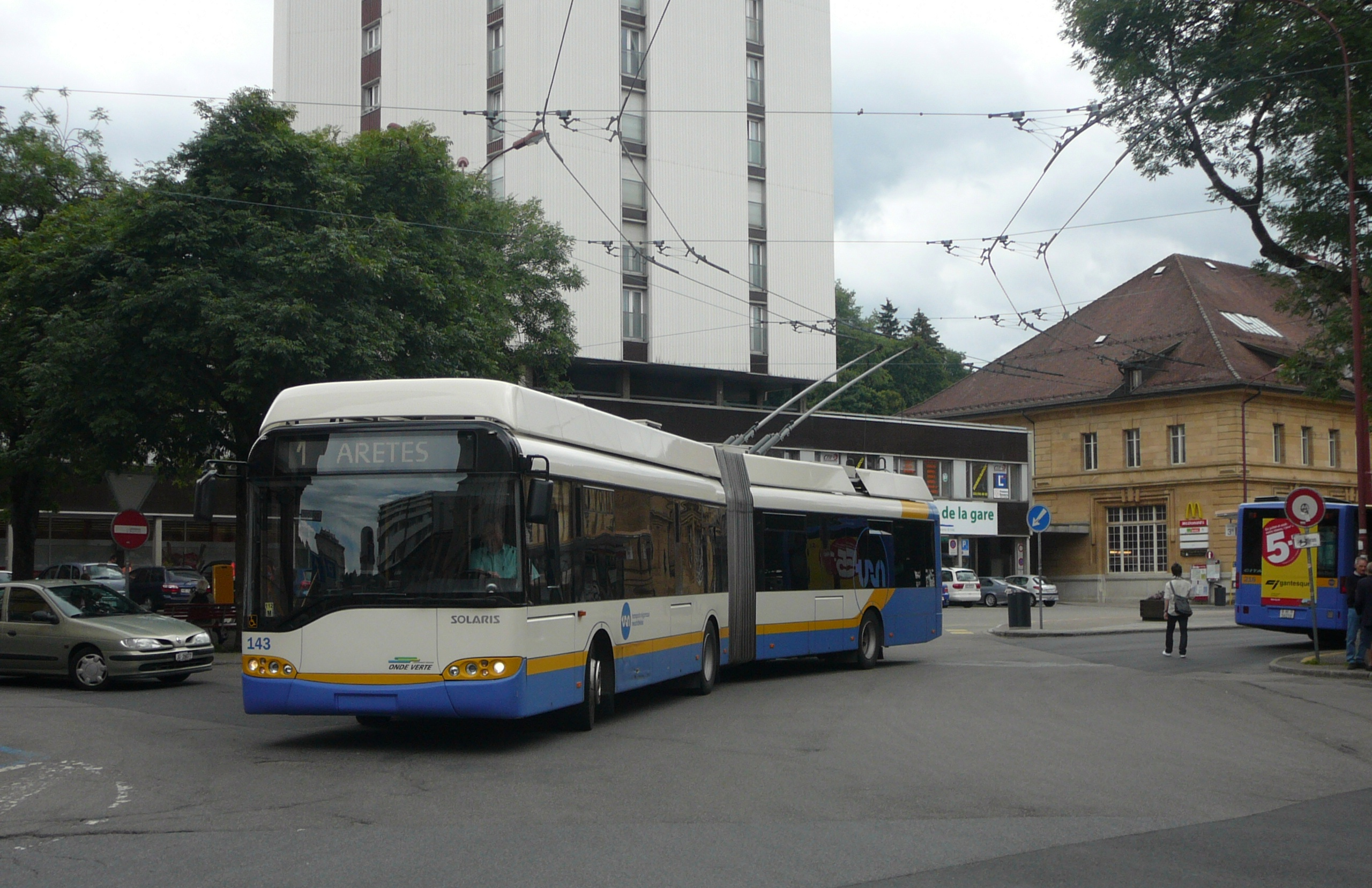
Solaris Trollino 18 of II generation

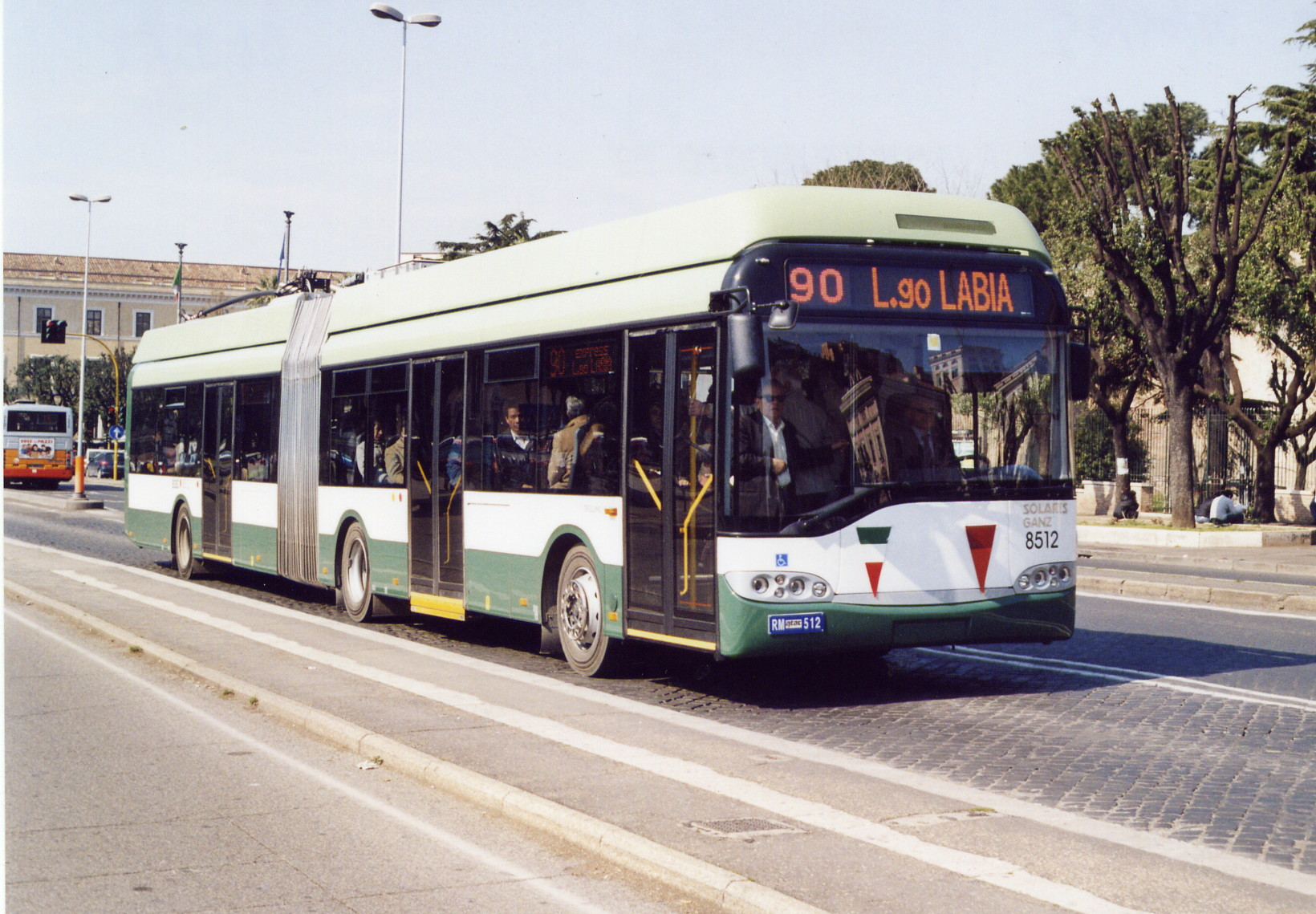
Solaris-Ganz Trollino 18 of II generation

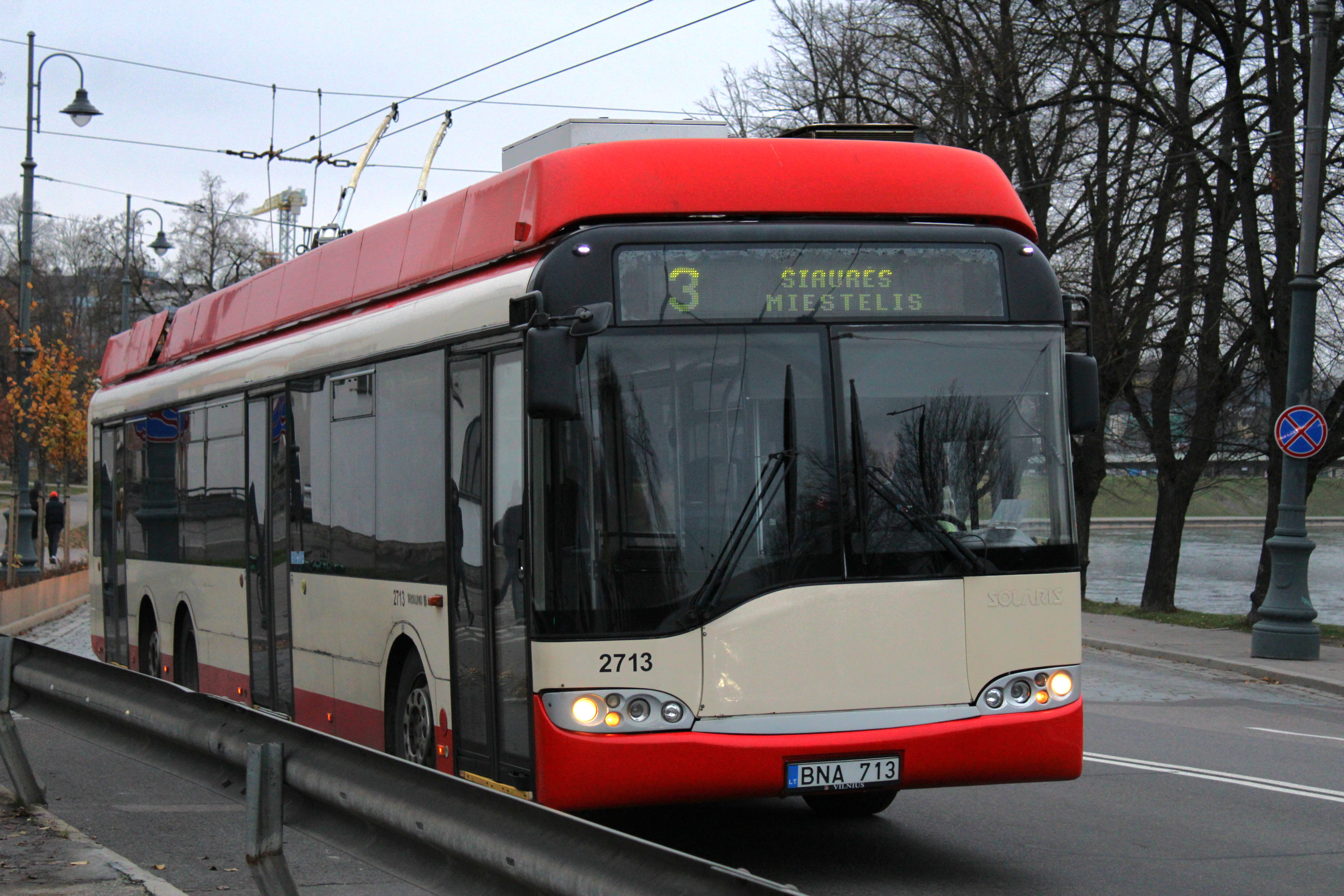
Solaris Trollino 15AC of II generation

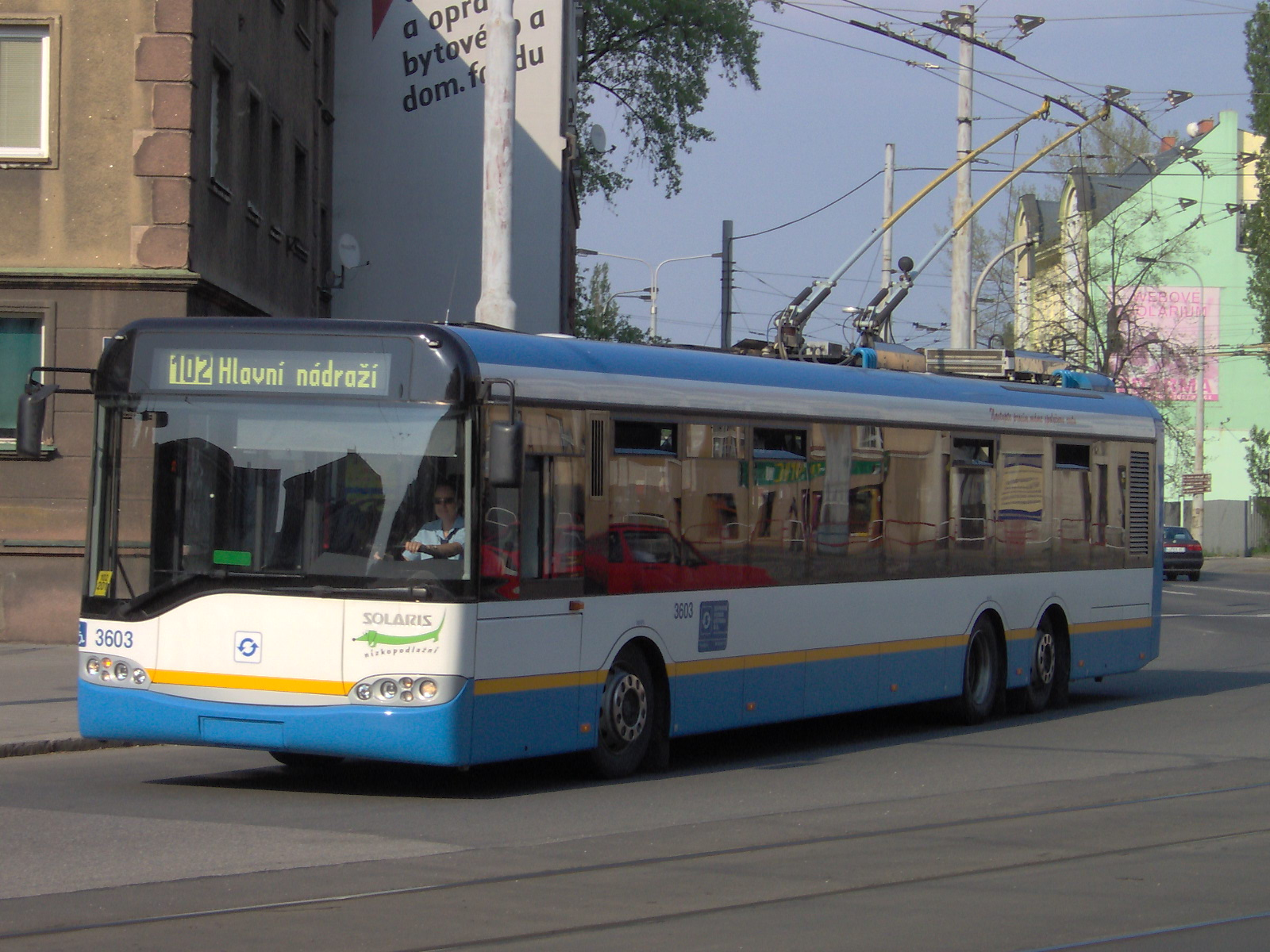
Solaris Trollino 15 of II generation

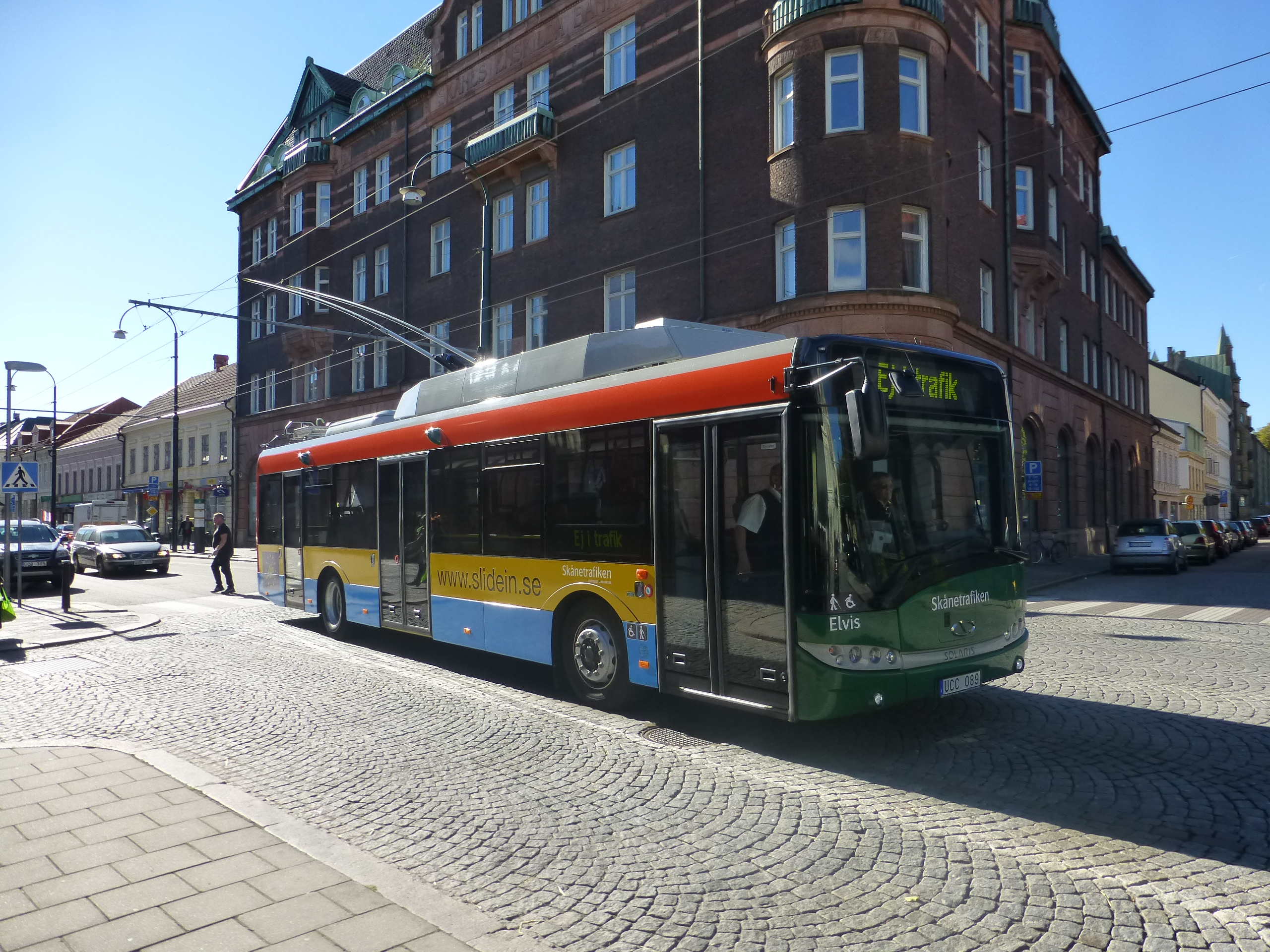
Solaris Trollino 12 of III generation

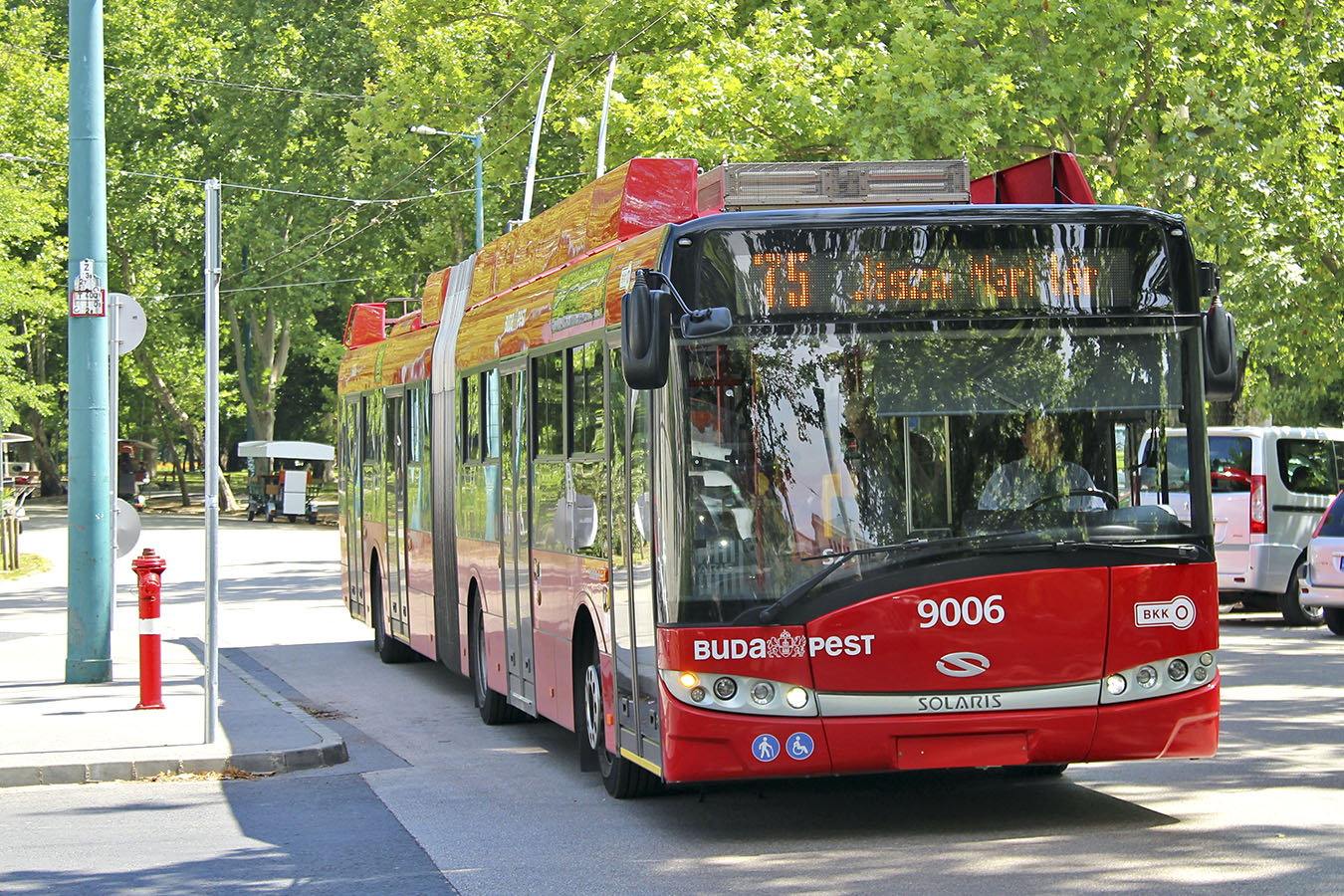
Solaris Trollino 18 of III generation

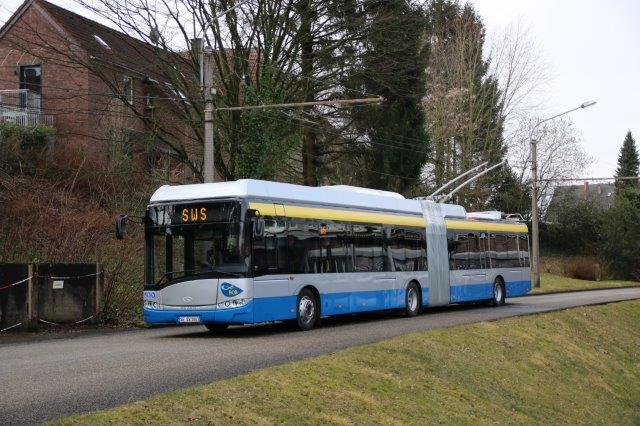
Solaris Trollino 18,75 of III generation

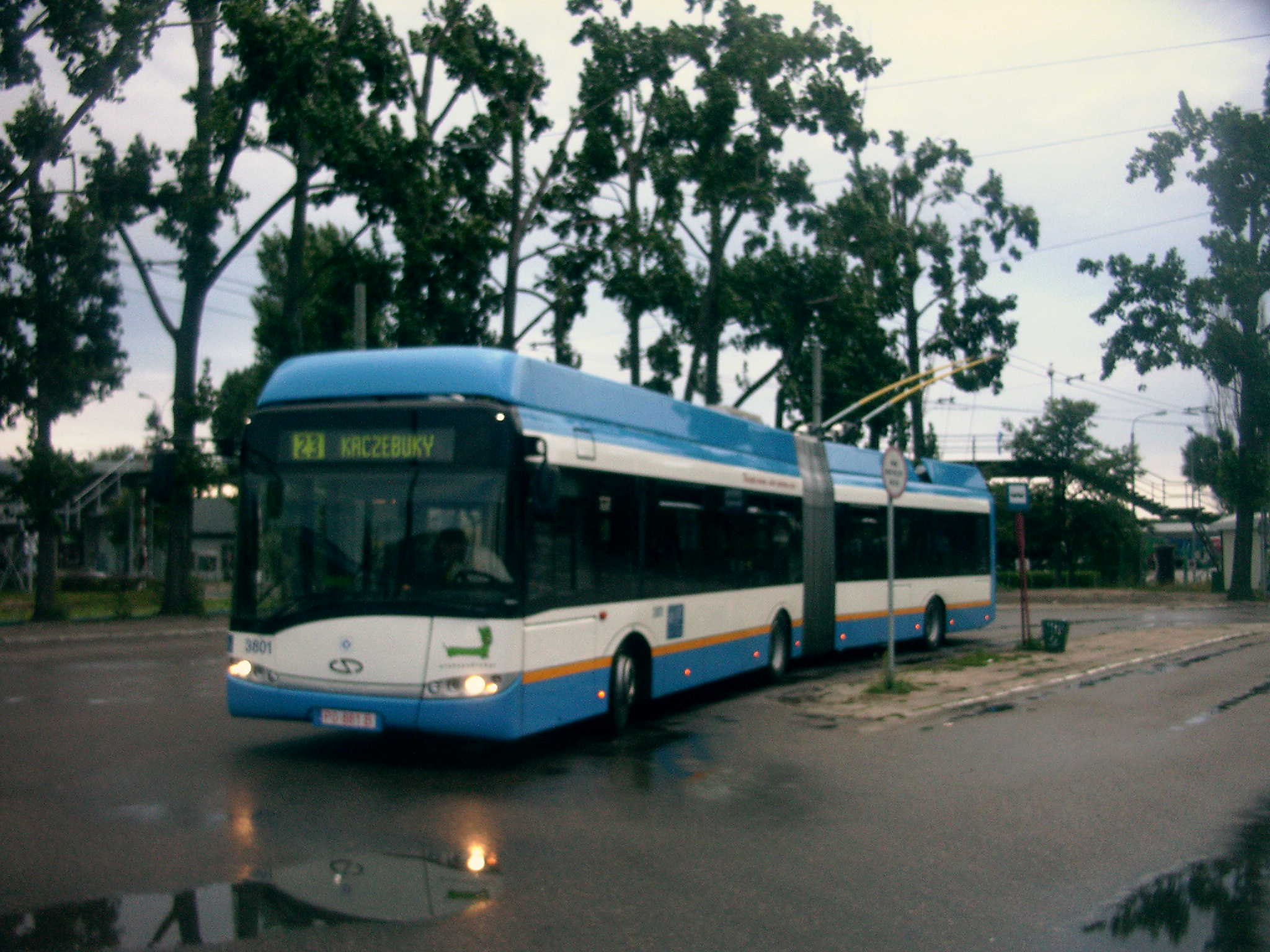
Solaris Trollino 18AC of III generation

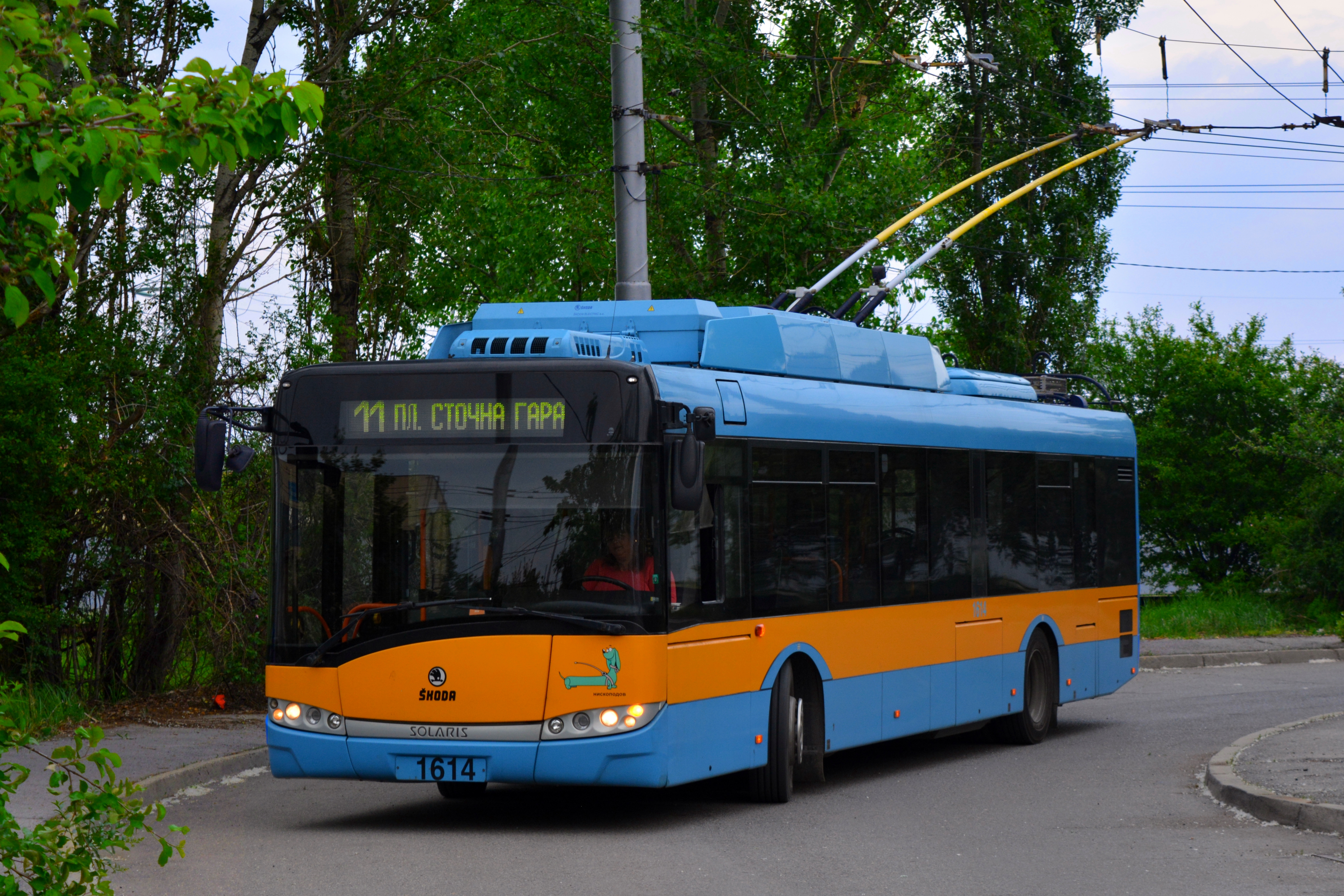
Škoda 26tr

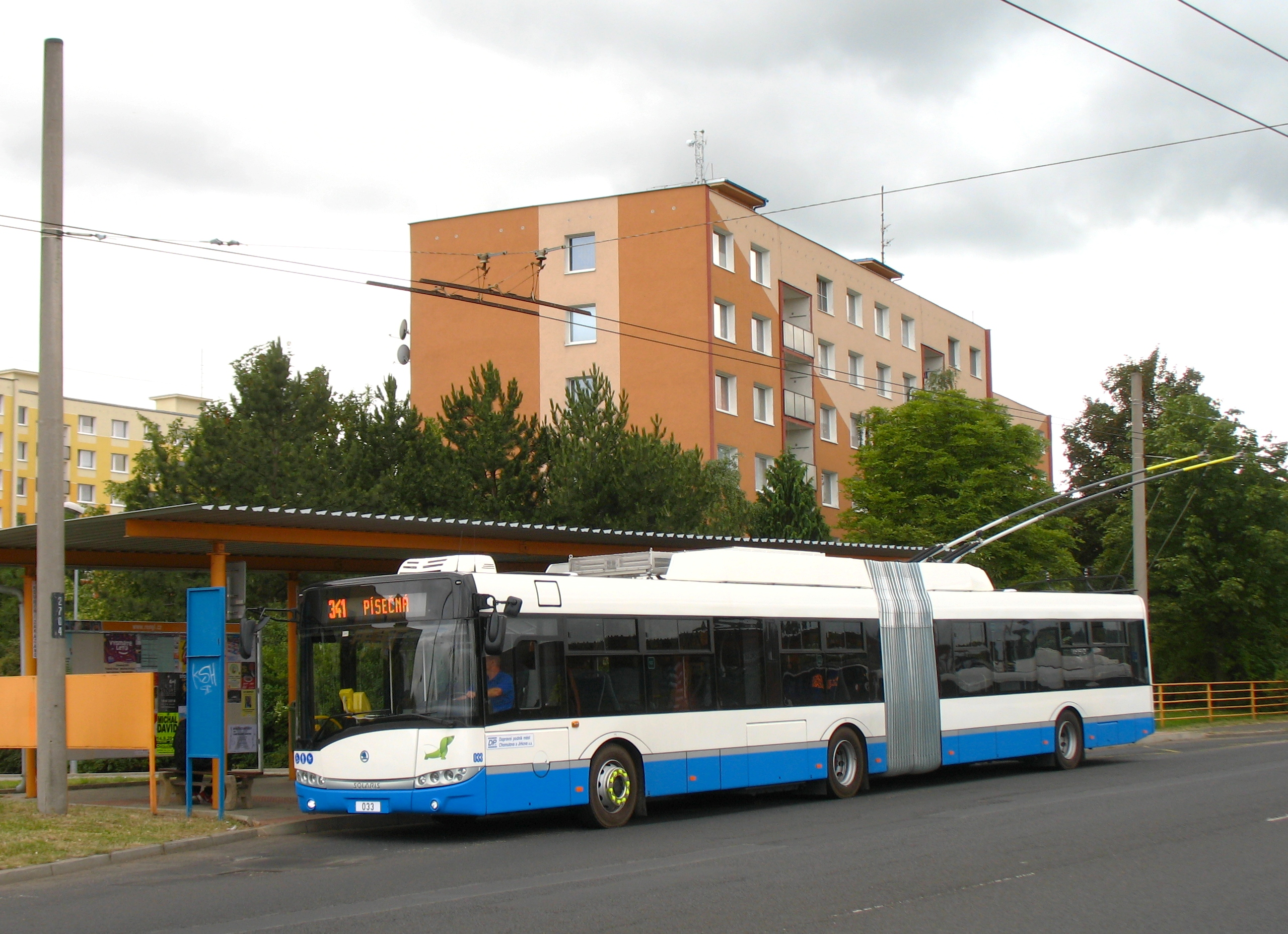
Škoda 27tr

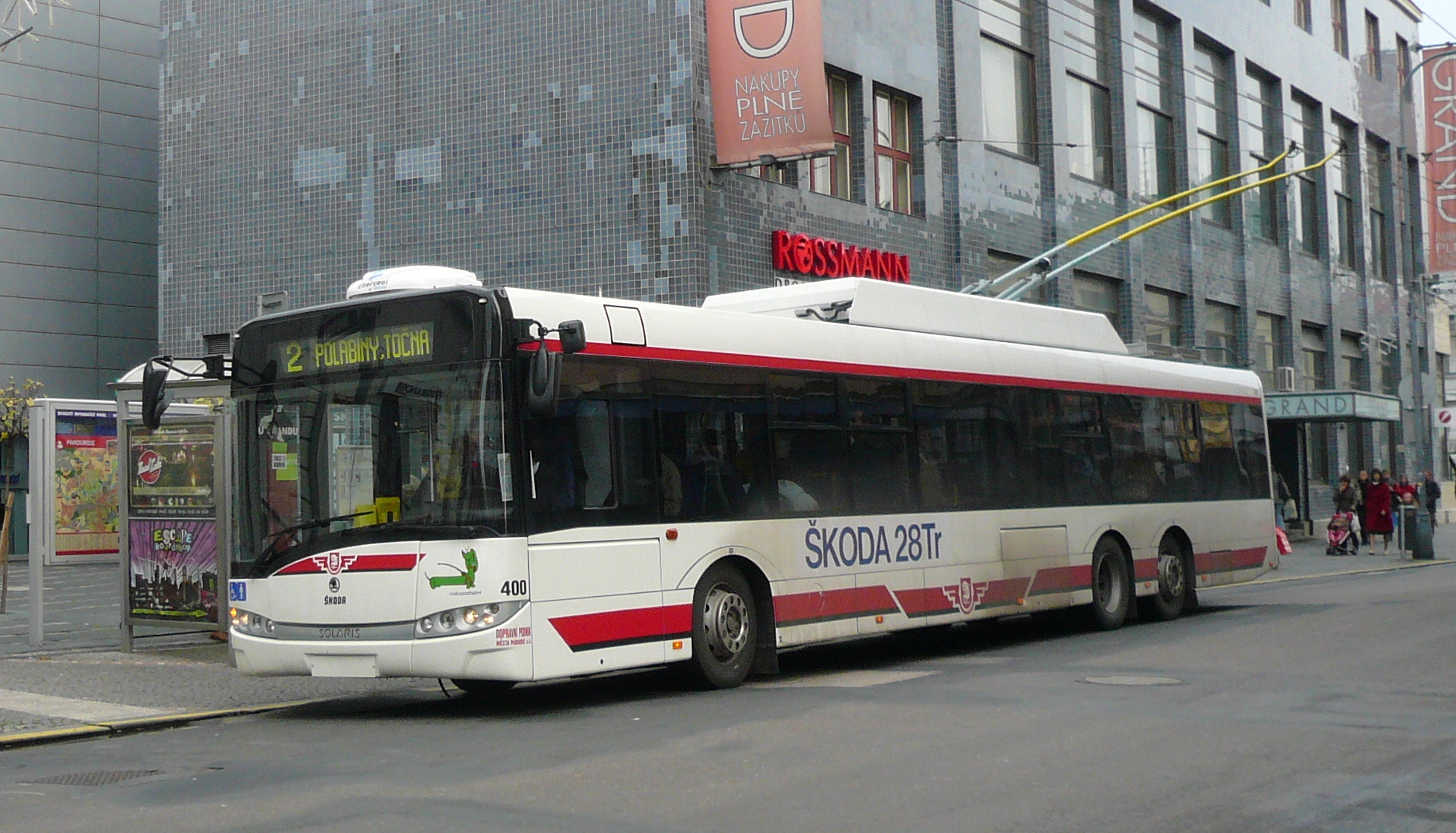
Škoda 28tr

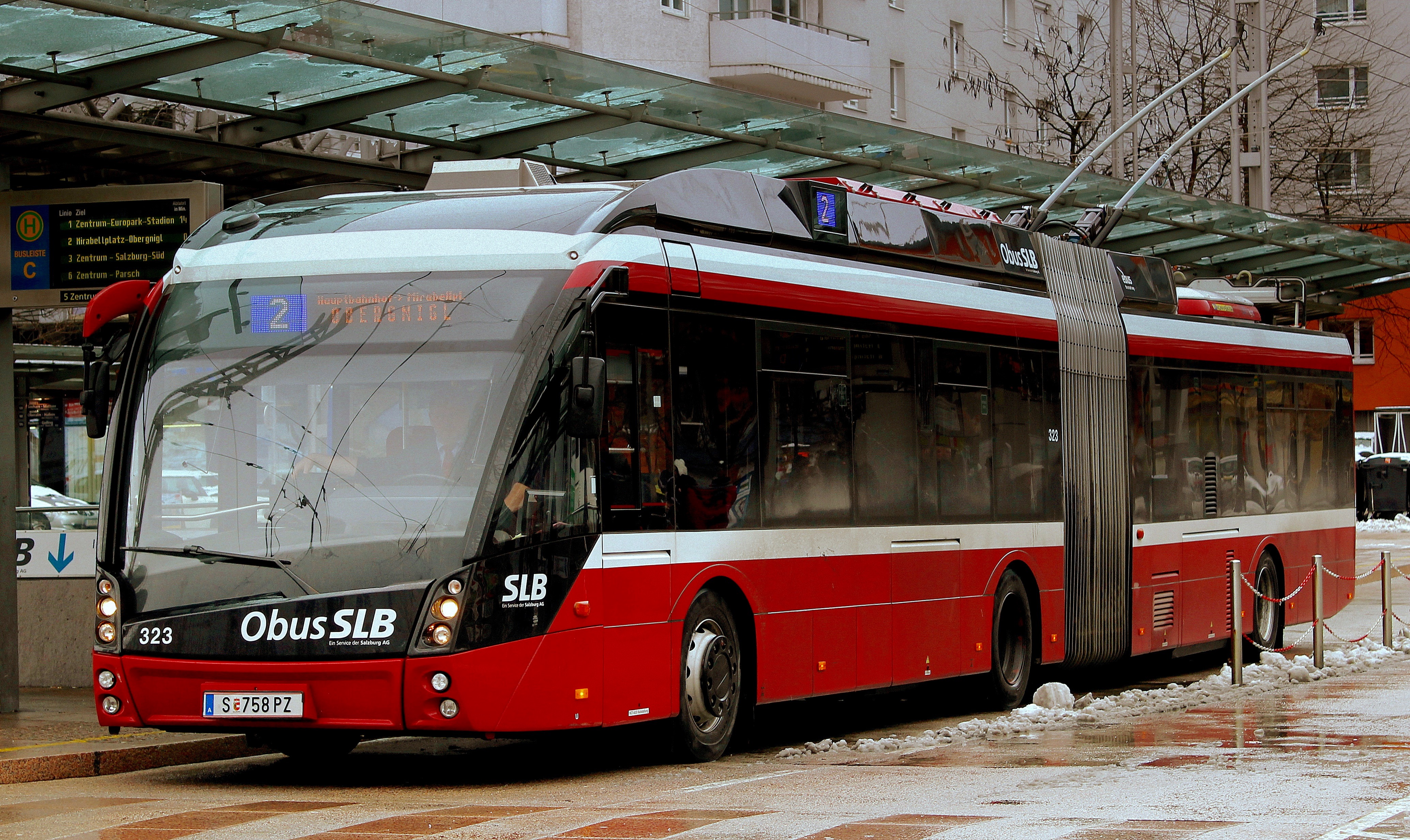
Solaris Trollino 18 MetroStyle of III generation

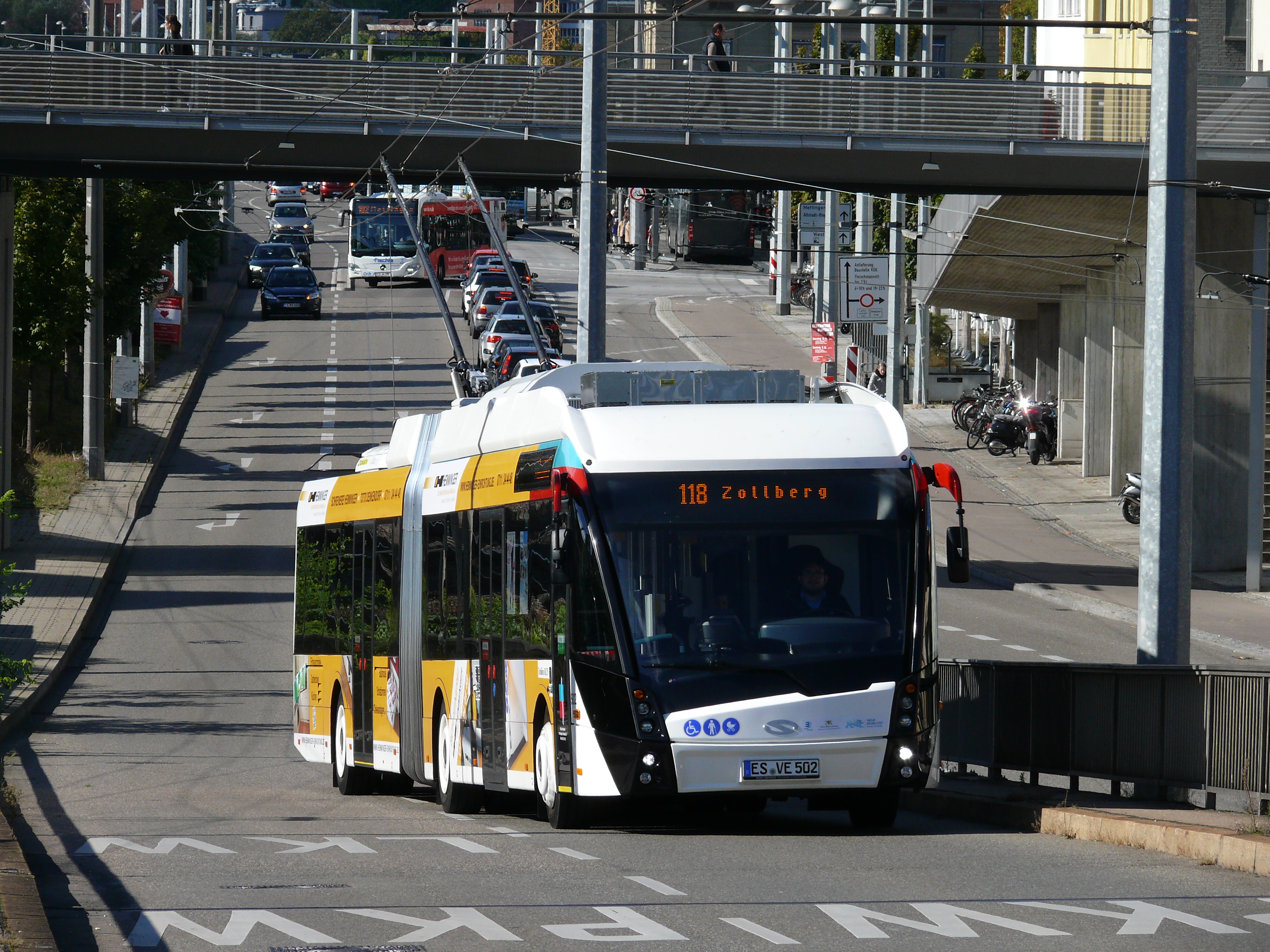
Solaris Trollino 18,75 MetroStyle of III generation

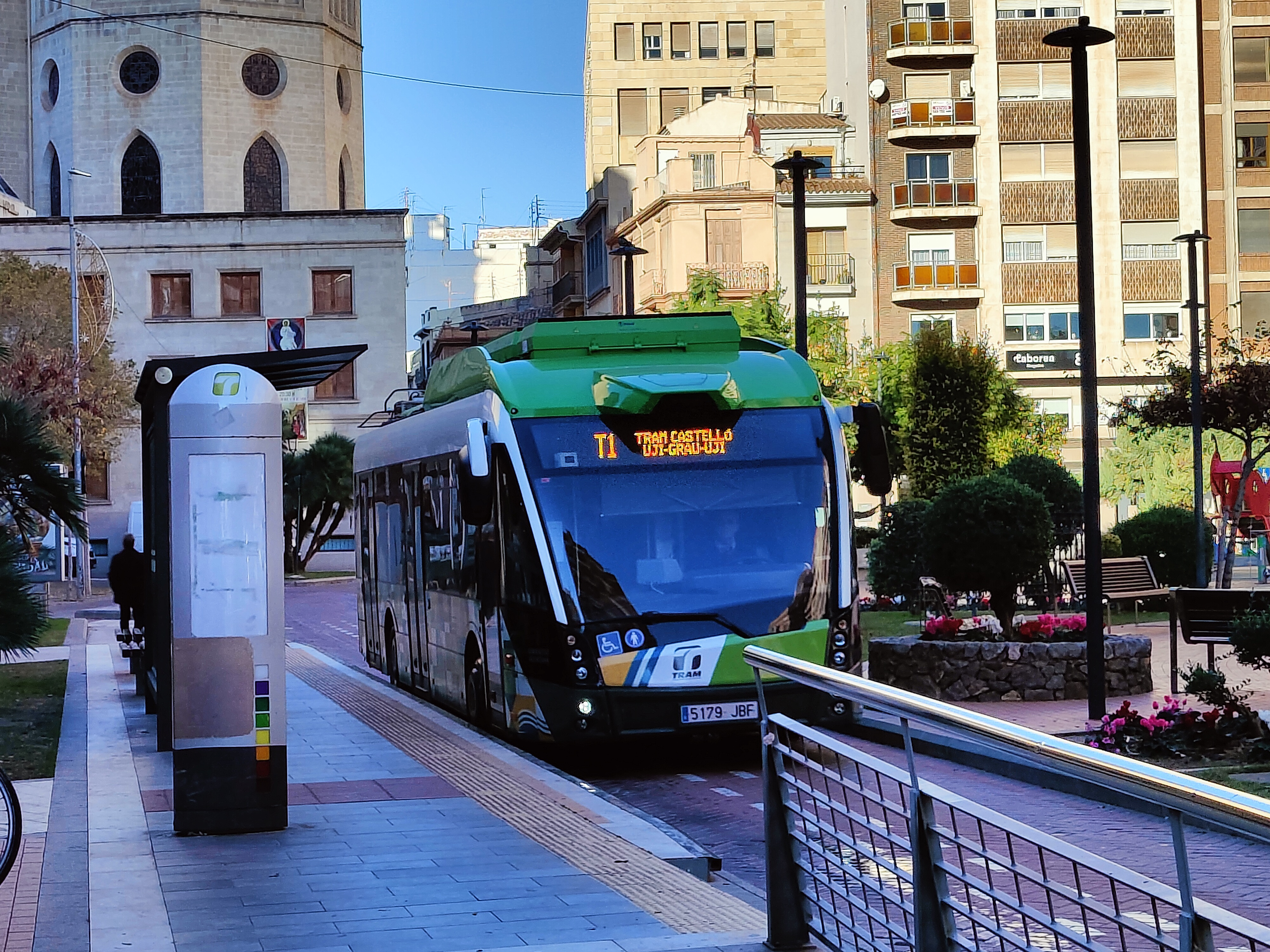
Solaris Trollino 12 MetroStyle of III generation

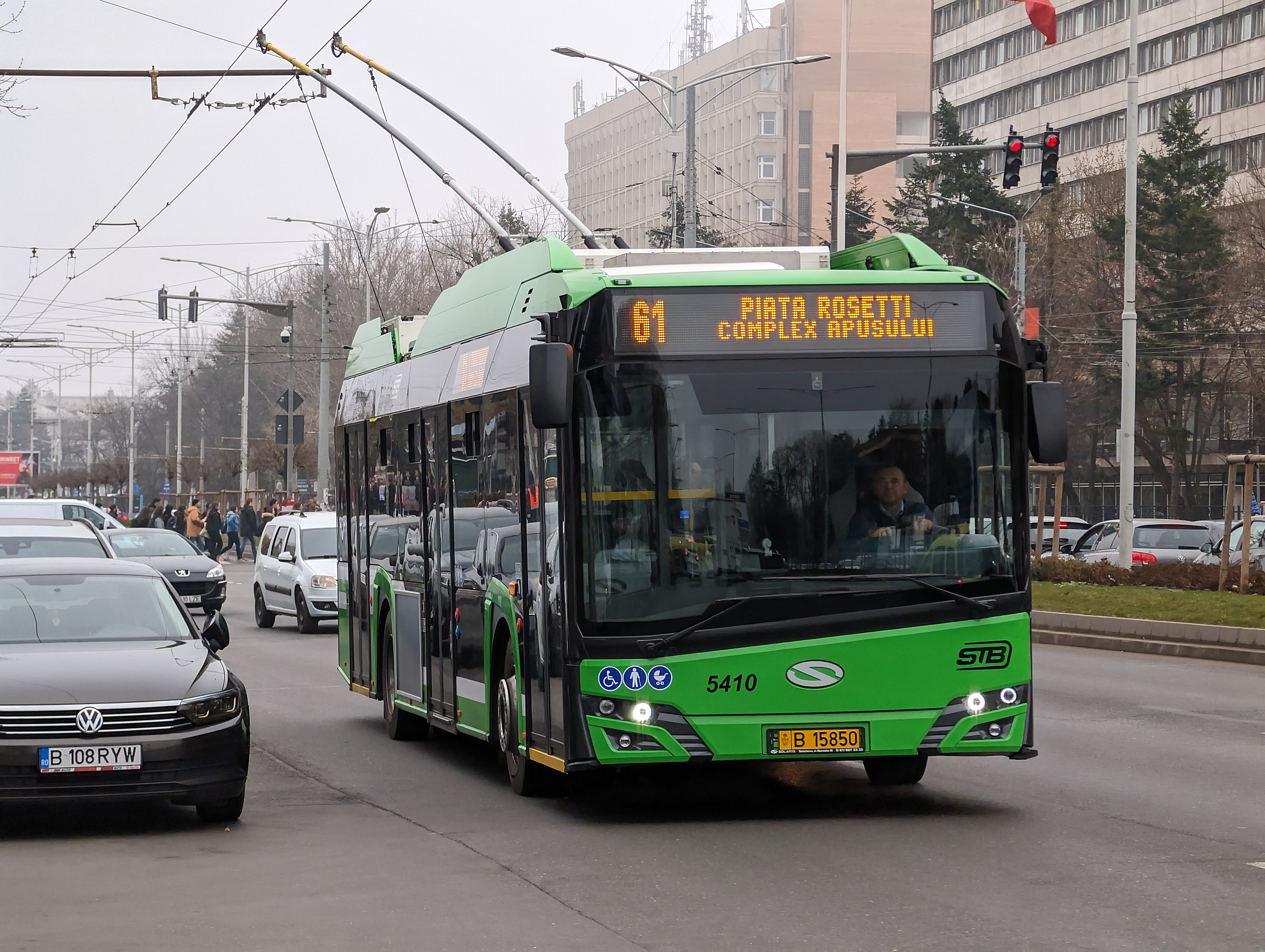
Solaris Trollino 12 of IV generation

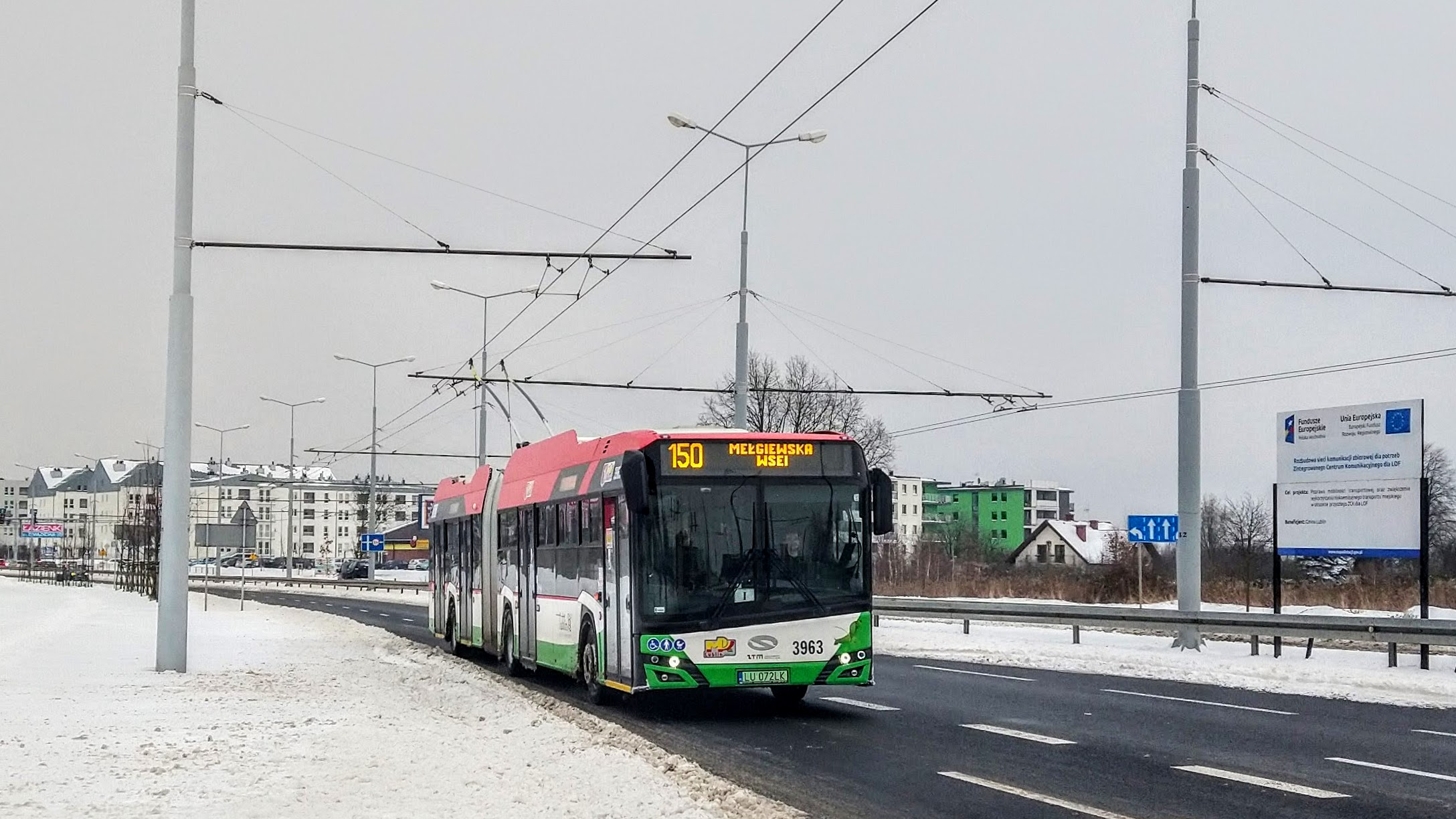
Solaris Trollino 18 of IV generation

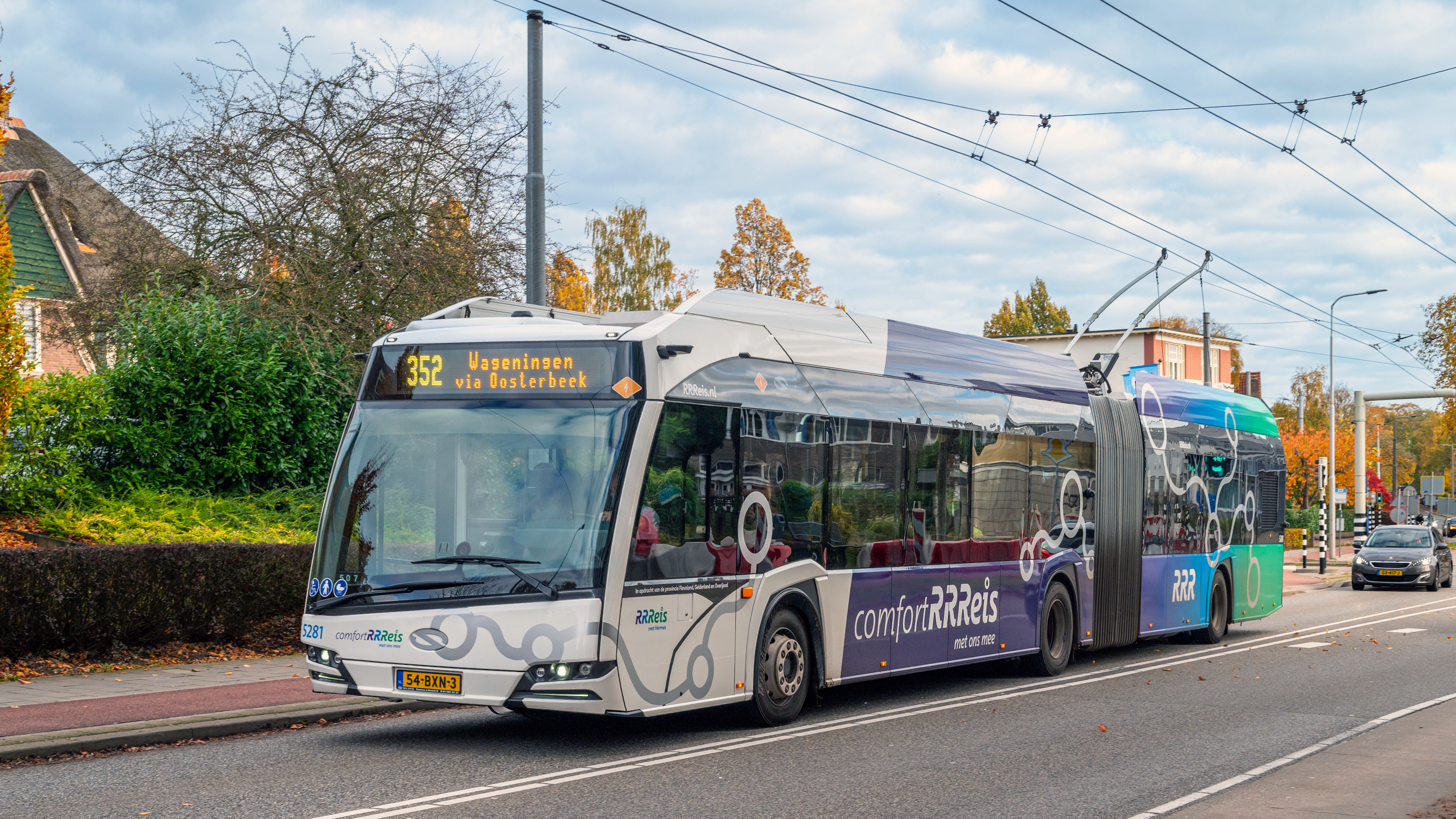
Solaris Trollino 18 MetroStyle of IV generation

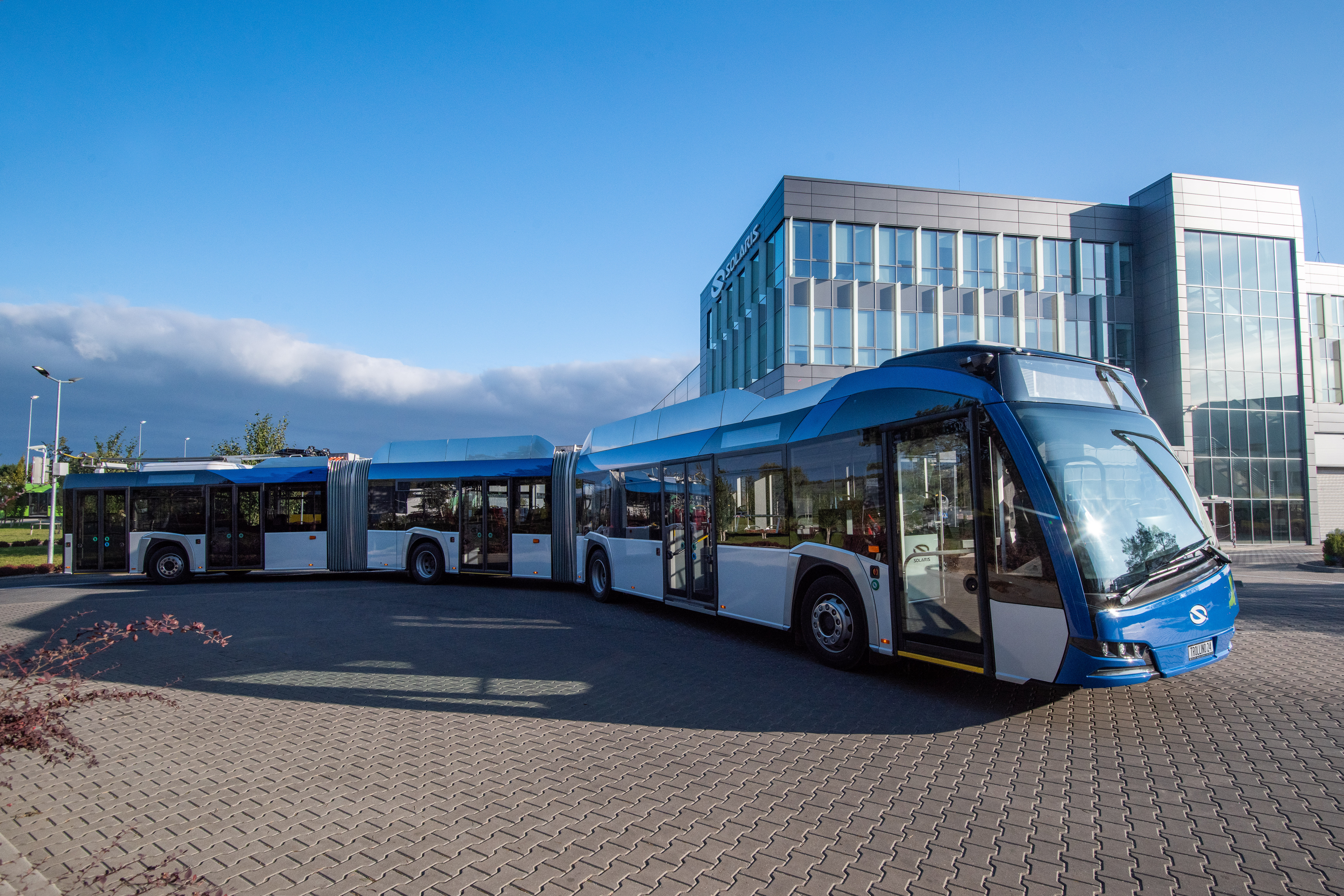
Solaris Trollino 24 MetroStyle of IV generation

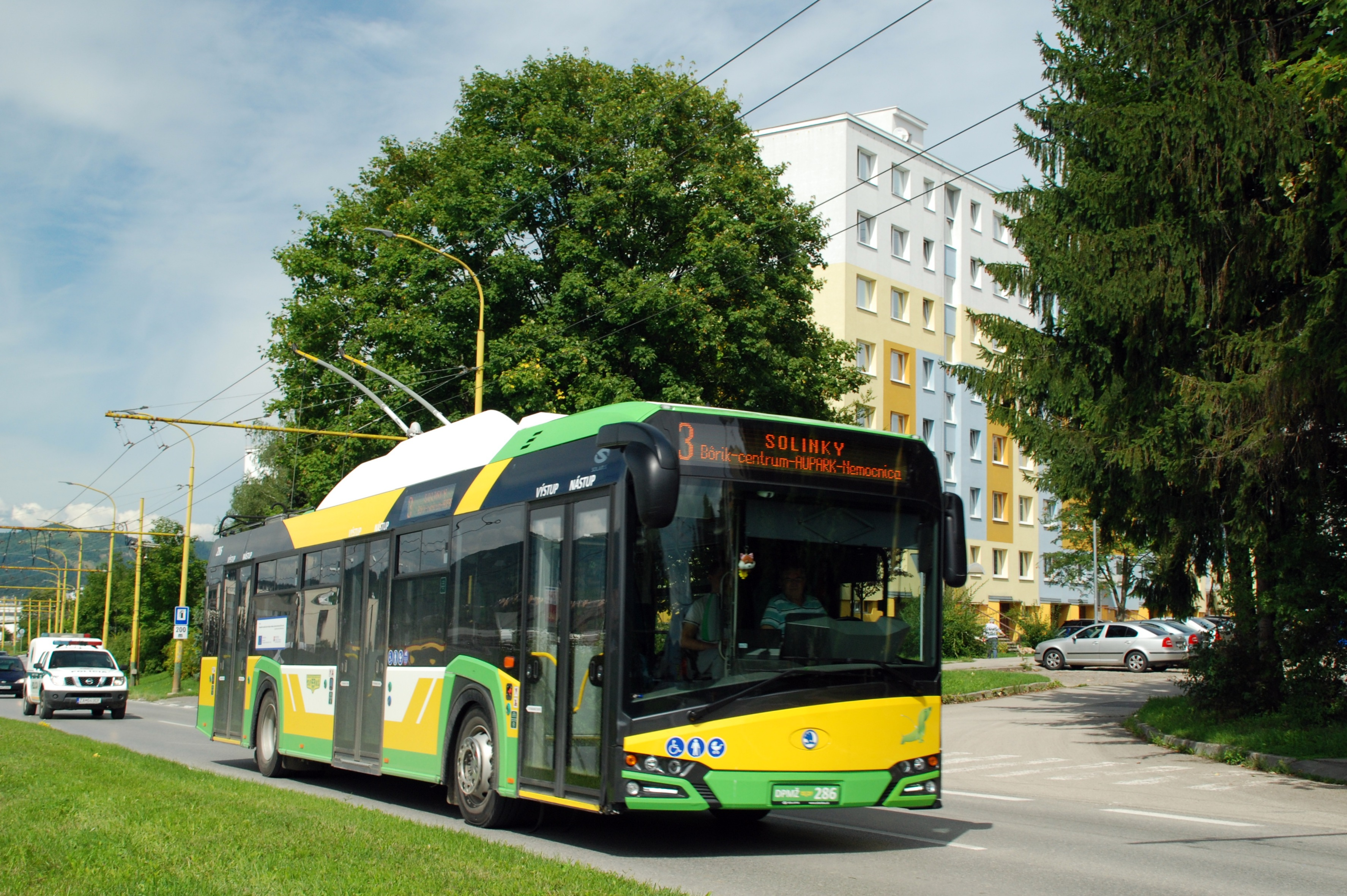
Škoda 26tr

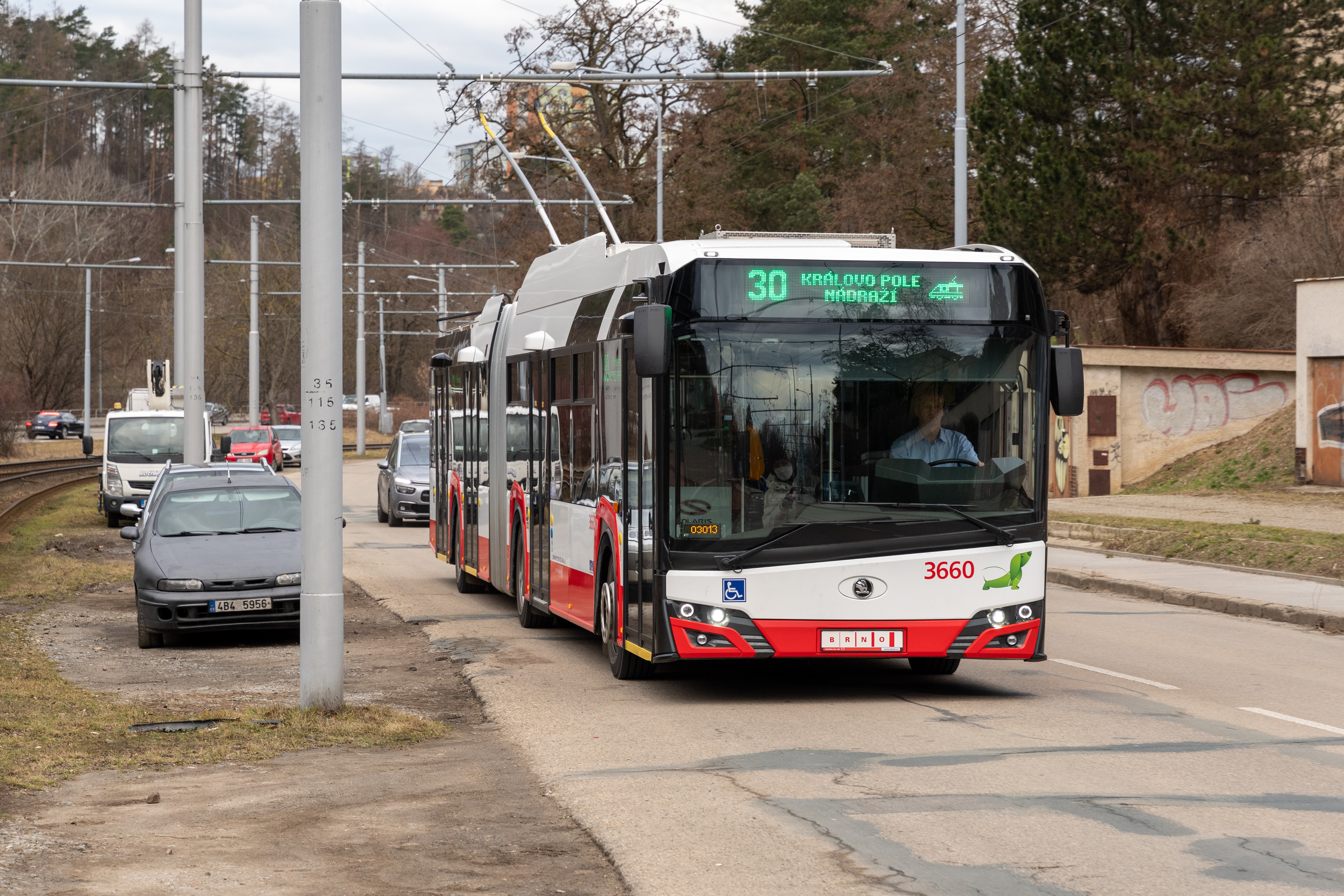
Škoda 27tr
