= Gmina Czerwonak =

Gmina Czerwonak Czerwonak Commune
- Gmina
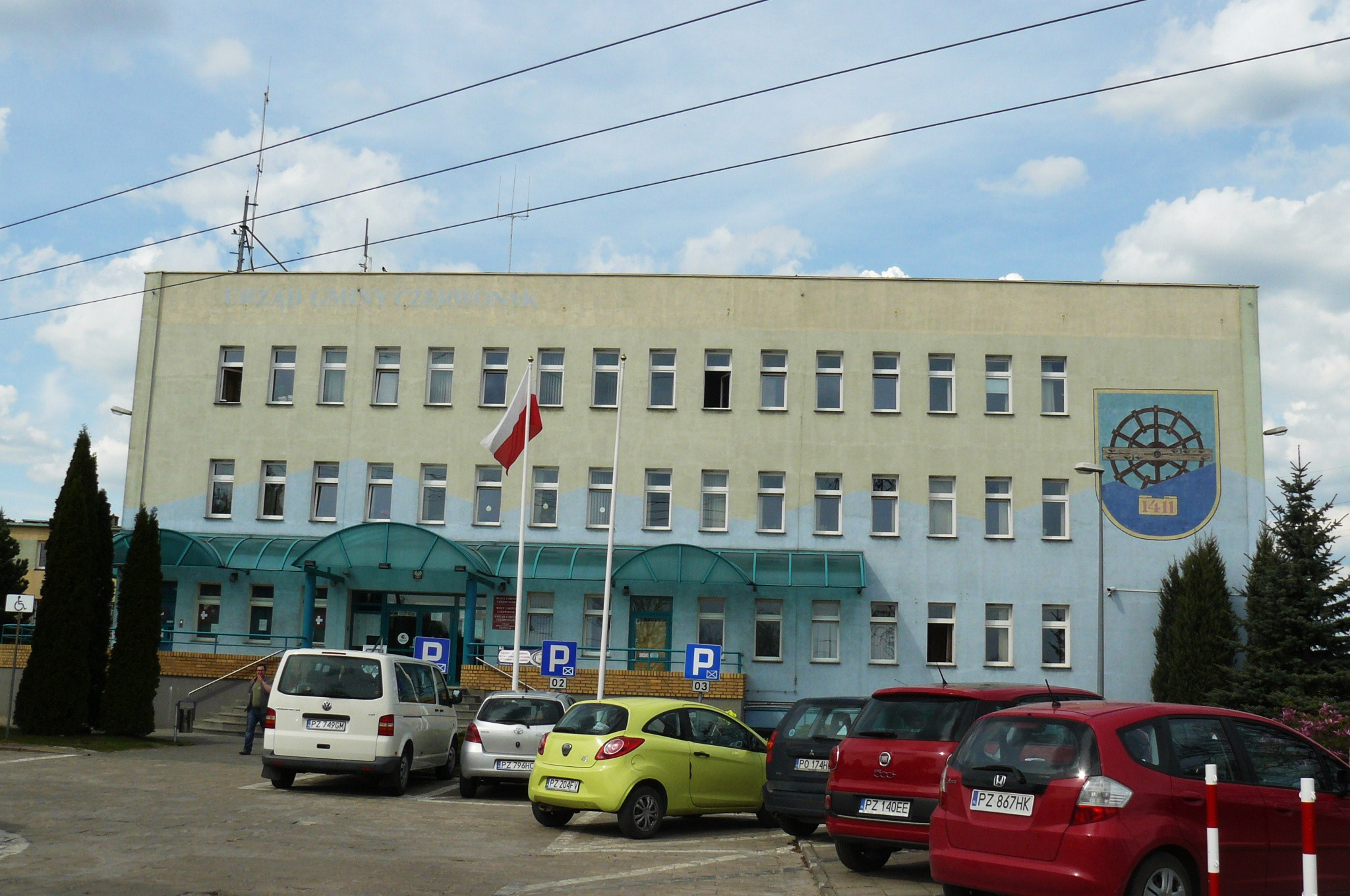

- Coat of arms
- Interactive map of Gmina Czerwonak
- Coordinates (Czerwonak): 52°28′11″N 16°58′51″E
- Country: Poland
- Voivodeship: Greater Poland
- County: Poznań County
- Seat: Czerwonak

Area
  - Total: 91.48 km^{2} (35.32 sq mi)

Population (2006)
  - Total: 23,692
  - Density: 259.0/km^{2} (670.8/sq mi)
- Website: http://www.czerwonak.ug.gov.pl/

Gmina Czerwonak is a rural gmina (administrative district) in Poznań County, Greater Poland Voivodeship, in west-central Poland. Its seat is the village of Czerwonak, which lies approximately 9 kilometres (6 mi) north-east of the regional capital Poznań.

The gmina covers an area of 91.48 square kilometres (35.3 sq mi), and as of 2023 its total population is 23,692. It includes Koziegłowy, which is Poland's second most populous village with 10,755 inhabitants (2006). Czerwonak itself has a population of 5,432. The gmina also contains the south-western part of the protected forest area Puszcza Zielonka Landscape Park, including the hill of Dziewicza Góra, which is the Park's highest point and has an observation tower (seasonally open to the public).

== Villages ==
Gmina Czerwonak contains the villages of Annowo, Bolechówko, Bolechowo, Bolechowo-Osiedle, Czerwonak, Dębogóra, Kicin, Kliny, Koziegłowy, Ludwikowo, Miękowo, Mielno, Owińska, Potasze, Promnice, Szlachęcin and Trzaskowo.

== Neighbouring gminas ==
Gmina Czerwonak is bordered by the city of Poznań to the south-west, and by the gminas of Swarzędz (south), Pobiedziska (south and east) Murowana Goślina (north and east), and Suchy Las (west).
