= Miękowo =

Miękowo may refer to the following places:

- Miękowo, Greater Poland Voivodeship (west-central Poland)
- Miękowo, Goleniów County in West Pomeranian Voivodeship (north-west Poland)
- Miękowo, Szczecinek County in West Pomeranian Voivodeship (north-west Poland)
