= Czerwonak =

- Village
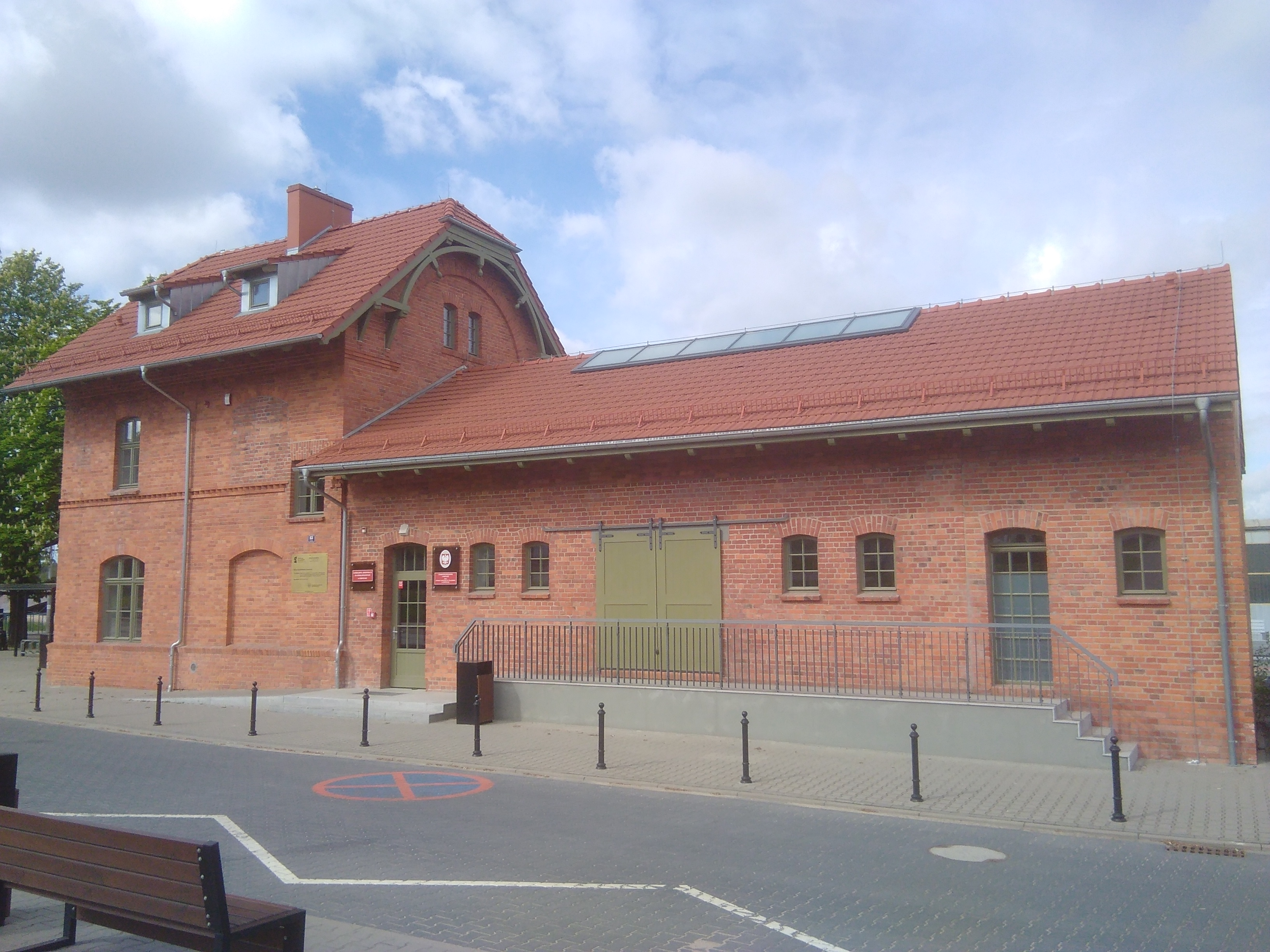
- Railway station

- Location within Poland
- Coordinates: 52°28′11″N 16°58′51″E
- Country: Poland
- Voivodeship: Greater Poland
- County: Poznań
- Gmina: Czerwonak

Population
  - Total: 5,432
- Time zone: UTC+1 (CET)
  - Summer (DST): UTC+2 (CEST)
- Vehicle registration: PZ

Czerwonak [t͡ʂɛrˈvɔnak] is a village in Poznań County, Greater Poland Voivodeship, in west-central Poland. It is the seat of the gmina (administrative district) called Gmina Czerwonak. It is located on the Warta River, within the Poznań metropolitan area.

In 2006 Czerwonak had a population of 5,432. The village of Koziegłowy, which borders Czerwonak to the south, has an even larger population.

Czerwonak adjoins the protected forest area known as Puszcza Zielonka Landscape Park. About 2 kilometres (1 mi) north-east of the village is the hill and observation tower of Dziewicza Góra, which is the Park's highest point.
