= Škoda 27Tr Solaris =

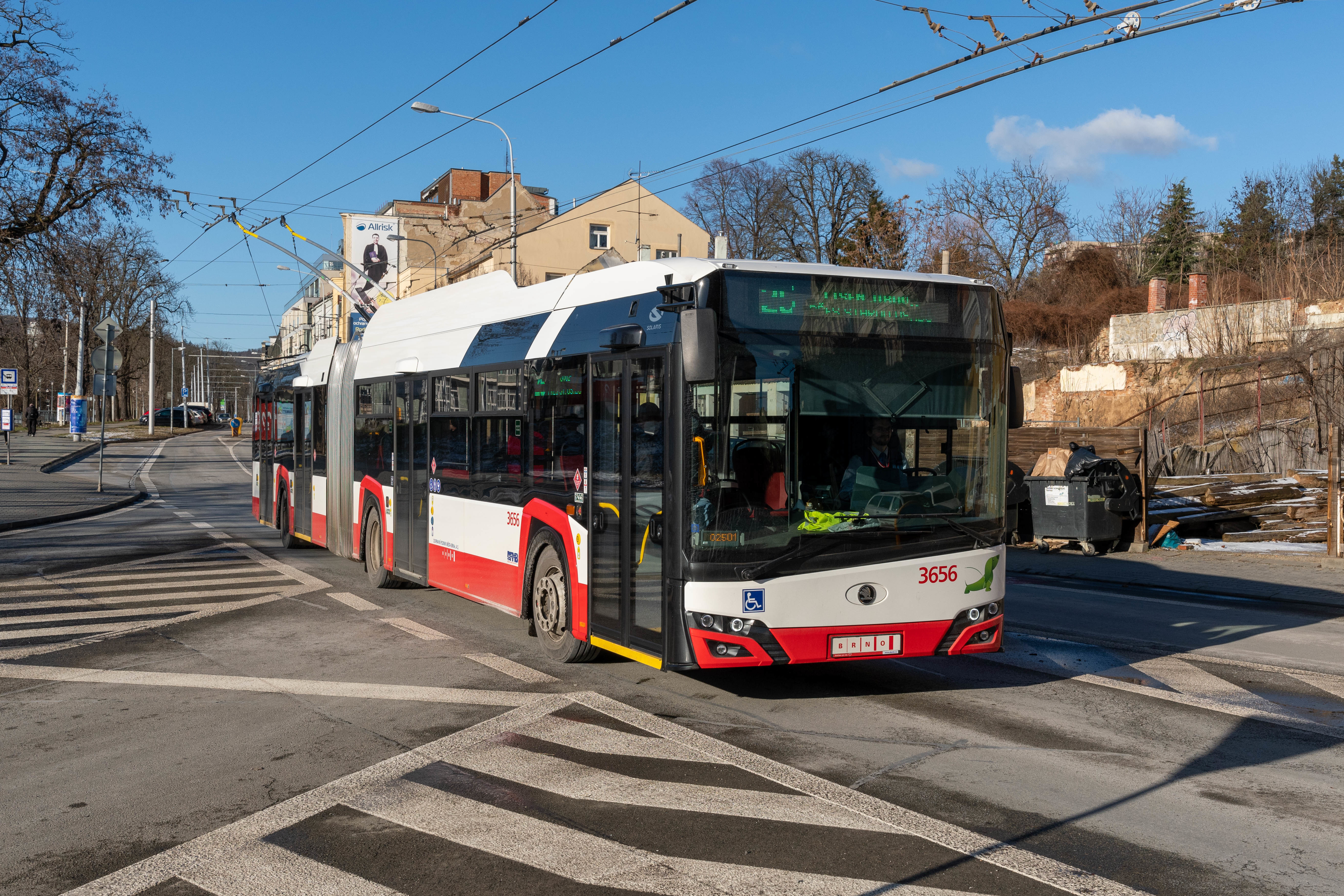
- Škoda 27Tr with Urbino IV body. In Brno, Czech Republic

Overview
- Type: 27Tr
- Manufacturer: Solaris; Škoda Transportation
- Production: 2010–present

Powertrain
- Engine: Skoda 33ML 3550 K/4
- Electric motor: AC drive with IGBT technology

Dimensions
- Length: 18,000 mm
- Width: 2,550 mm
- Height: 3,450 mm
- Curb weight: without DA: 16,500 kg with DA: ? kg

Škoda 27Tr Solaris is a low-entry trolleybus model produced from 2010 by Czech manufacturer Škoda Electric (subsidiary of Škoda Transportation), supplying electrical equipment, in cooperation with the Polish company Solaris, manufacturing the trolleybus. Electric motor installation is carried out at Škoda's plant in Plzeň, Czech Republic.

A similar / same type of trolleybus with the same chassis is the Solaris Trollino 18 model.

== History ==
The prototype of the 27Tr trolleybus, which was manufactured in 2009, was delivered to Dopravní podnik Ostrava in 2010 together with two twelve-meter Škoda 26Tr cars. Prototype 27Tr went on its first test runs in Plzeň around Christmas 2009, in Ostrava on February 4, 2010 and was first sent into test operation with passengers on February 11, 2010. As a type, the 27Tr car was approved by the Railway Authority in the first quarter of 2010.

The trolleybus has been delivered to various European countries. In the Czech Republic, (Plzeň, Ostrava, České Budějovice, Ústí nad Labem); Slovakia (Bratislava, Žilina), Bulgaria (Sofia) and Latvia (Riga).
