= Potasze =

- Village
- Location within Poland
- Coordinates: 52°31′N 17°0′E
- Country: Poland
- Voivodeship: Greater Poland
- County: Poznań
- Gmina: Czerwonak
- Population: 170

Potasze [pɔˈtaʂɛ] is a village in the administrative district of Gmina Czerwonak, within Poznań County, Greater Poland Voivodeship, in west-central Poland.
