= Kicin, Greater Poland Voivodeship =

Kicin
- Village
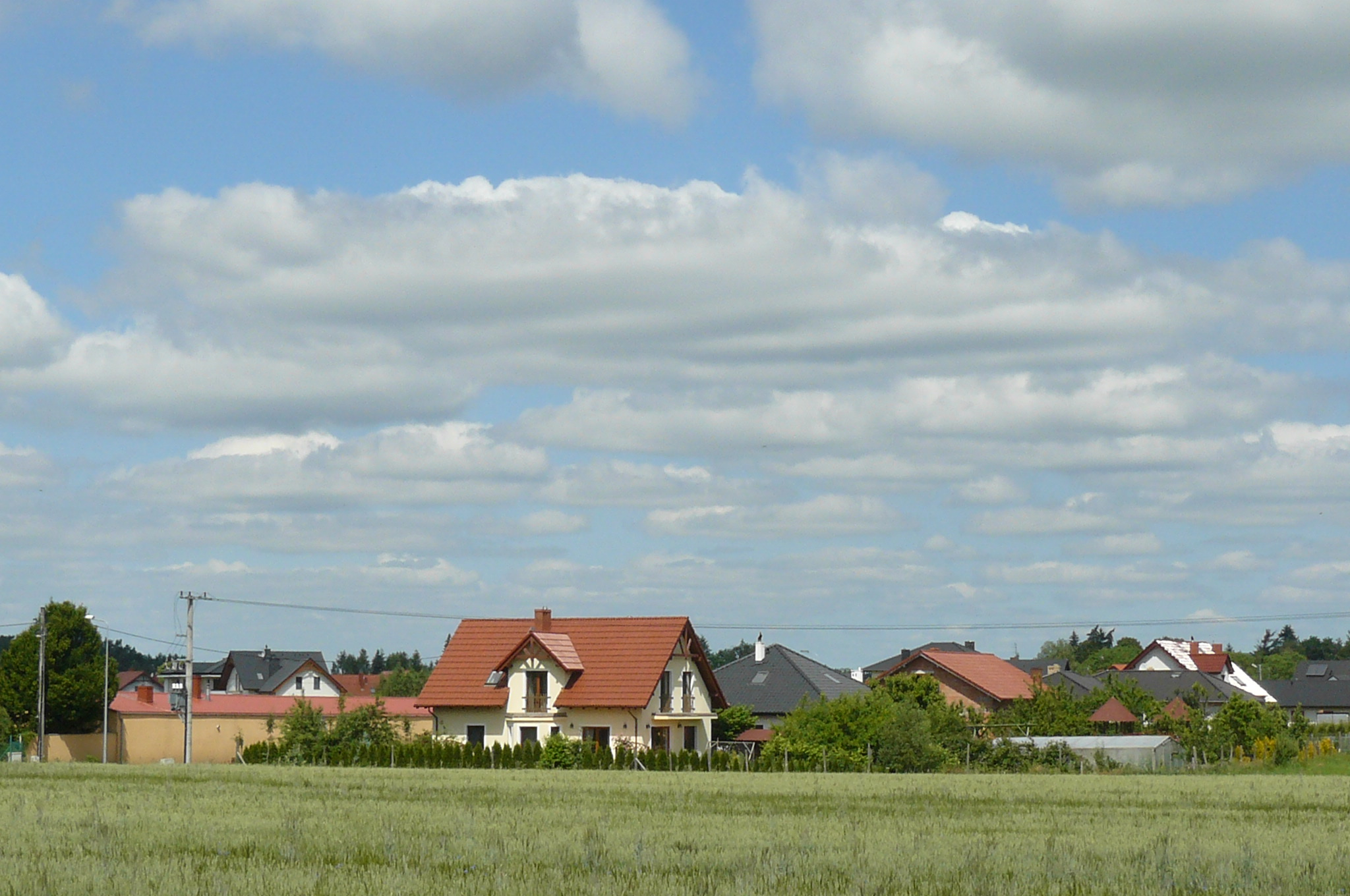

- Location within Poland
- Coordinates: 52°27′N 17°1′E
- Country: Poland
- Voivodeship: Greater Poland
- County: Poznań
- Gmina: Czerwonak

Population
  - Total: 1,600
- Time zone: UTC+1 (CET)
  - Summer (DST): UTC+2 (CEST)
- Vehicle registration: PZ

Kicin [ˈkit͡ɕin] is a village in the administrative district of Gmina Czerwonak, within Poznań County, Greater Poland Voivodeship, in west-central Poland.

Kicin's church is on the Wooden Churches Trail around the Puszcza Zielonka Landscape Park.

== History ==
Four Polish citizens were murdered by Nazi Germany in the village during World War II.
