= Szlachęcin =

- Village
- Location within Poland
- Coordinates: 52°33′48″N 16°58′46″E
- Country: Poland
- Voivodeship: Greater Poland
- County: Poznań
- Gmina: Czerwonak
- Population: 80

Szlachęcin [ʂlaˈxɛnt͡ɕin] is a village in the administrative district of Gmina Czerwonak, within Poznań County, Greater Poland Voivodeship, in west-central Poland.
