= Dębogóra, Poznań County =

Dębogóra
- Village
- Location within Poland
- Coordinates: 52°29′N 17°5′E
- Country: Poland
- Voivodeship: Greater Poland
- County: Poznań
- Gmina: Czerwonak

Dębogóra [dɛmbɔˈɡura] is a village in the administrative district of Gmina Czerwonak, within Poznań County, Greater Poland Voivodeship, in west-central Poland. It has about 100 inhabitants. The village was the birthplace of the officer of the Polish Army Jan Mikołajewski.
