= Ludwikowo, Gmina Czerwonak =

Ludwikowo
- Settlement
- Location within Poland
- Coordinates: 52°30′27″N 17°04′51″E
- Country: Poland
- Voivodeship: Greater Poland
- County: Poznań
- Gmina: Czerwonak
- Population: 9

Ludwikowo [ludviˈkɔvɔ] is a settlement in the administrative district of Gmina Czerwonak, within Poznań County, Greater Poland Voivodeship, in west-central Poland.
