= Koziegłowy, Greater Poland Voivodeship =

Village in Greater Poland Voivodeship, Poland

Koziegłowy
- village
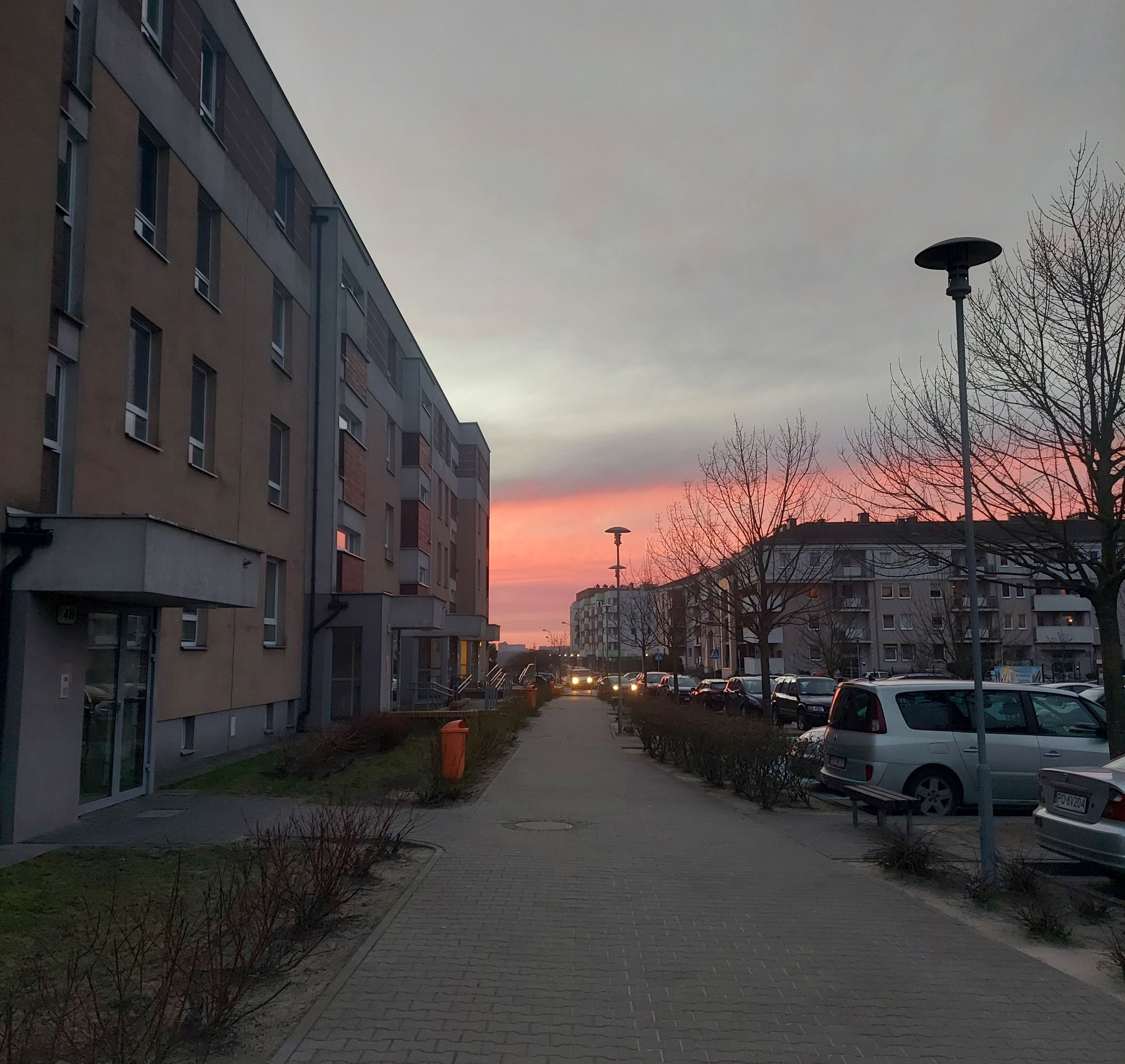
- Osiedle Leśne Estate in Koziegłowy

- Location within Poland
- Coordinates: 52°26′N 16°59′E
- Country: Poland
- Voivodeship: Greater Poland
- County: Poznań
- Gmina: Czerwonak

Population
  - Total: 10,755

Koziegłowy [kɔʑɛˈɡwɔvɨ] is a village in the administrative district of Gmina Czerwonak, within Poznań County, Greater Poland Voivodeship, in west-central Poland. It adjoins Czerwonak to the north and the city of Poznań to the south. It is one of the 2 villages in Poland with a population of at least 9000.

In 2006 Koziegłowy had 10,755 inhabitants, which makes it one of the most populous villages in Poland (in second place behind Kozy).

Koziegłowy lies on the main road from Poznań to Wągrowiec, and consists mainly of modern residential developments situated to the east of that road. To the west is the Warta River and the main sewage treatment plant for the city of Poznań.

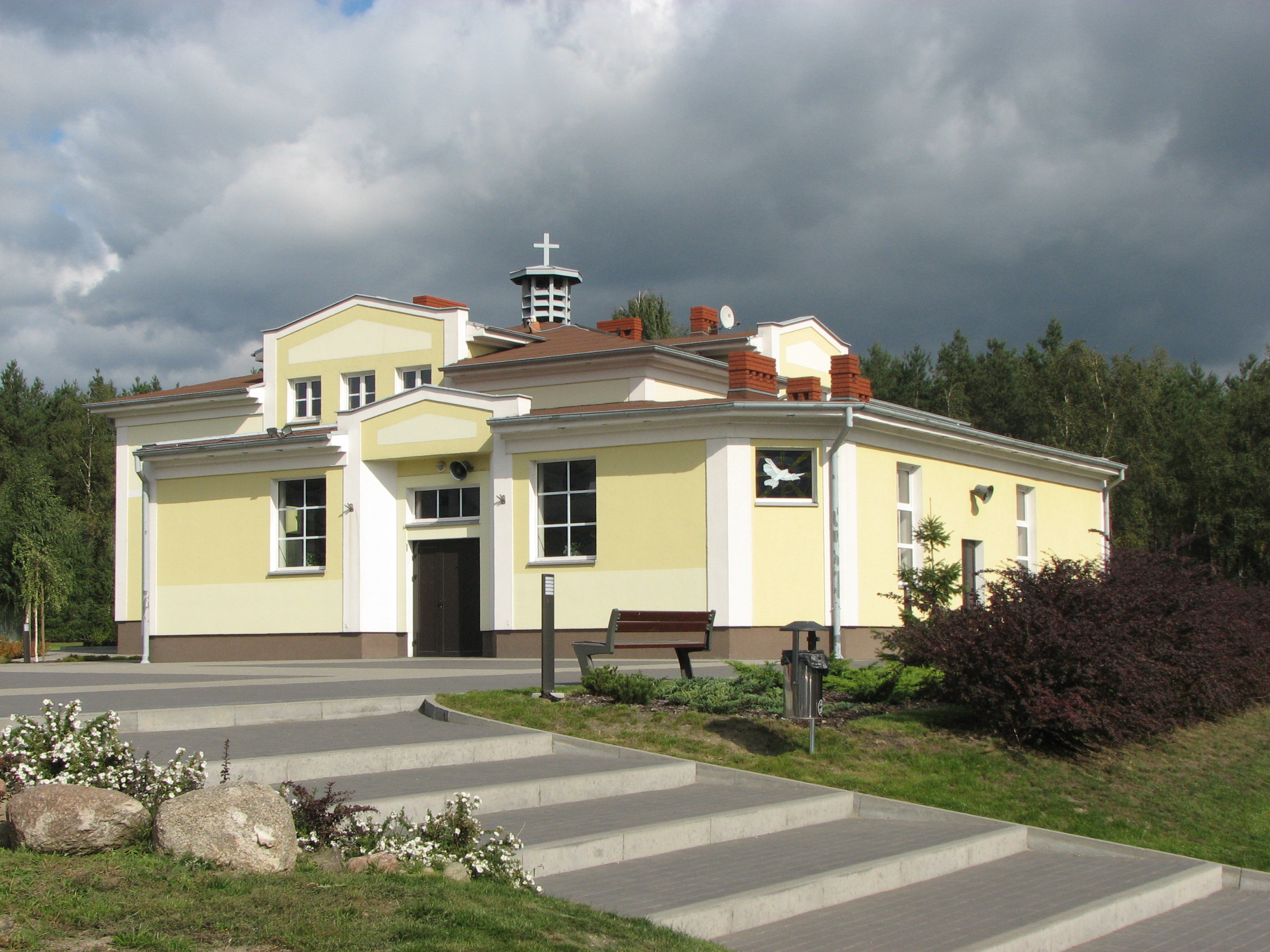
Chapel of Our Lady of Fatima
