= Trzaskowo =

- Village
- Location within Poland
- Coordinates: 52°32′4″N 17°1′11″E
- Country: Poland
- Voivodeship: Greater Poland
- County: Poznań
- Gmina: Czerwonak
- Population: 62

Trzaskowo [tʂasˈkɔvɔ] is a village in the administrative district of Gmina Czerwonak, within Poznań County, Greater Poland Voivodeship, in west-central Poland.
