= Annowo, Greater Poland Voivodeship =

Annowo
- Village
- Location within Poland
- Coordinates: 52°29′N 17°0′E
- Country: Poland
- Voivodeship: Greater Poland
- County: Poznań
- Gmina: Czerwonak
- Population: 187

Annowo [anˈnɔvɔ] is a village in the administrative district of Gmina Czerwonak, within Poznań County, Greater Poland Voivodeship, in west-central Poland.
