= Bolechowo-Osiedle =

- Village
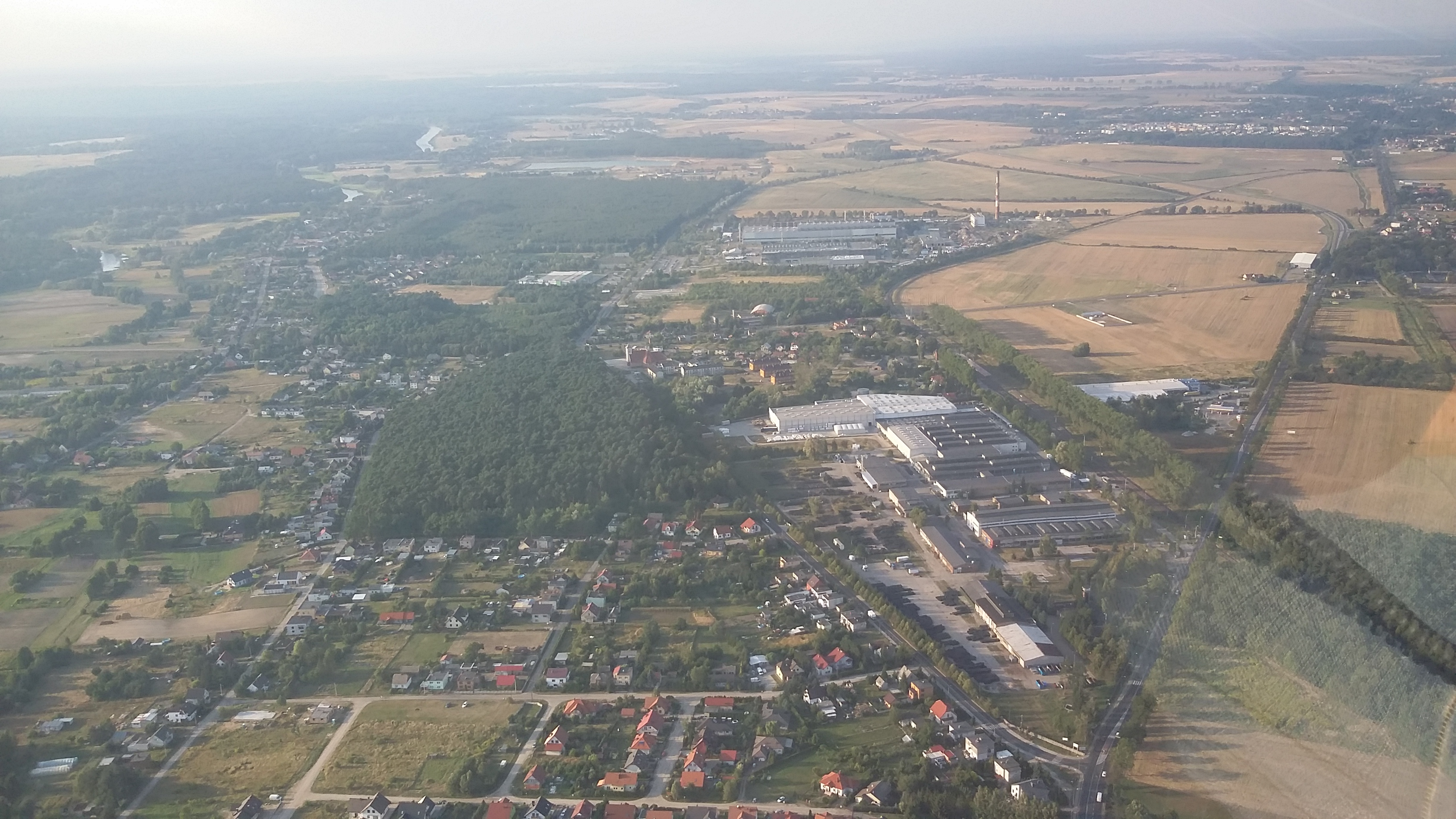
- Aerial view

- Location within Poland
- Coordinates: 52°32′11″N 16°58′43″E
- Country: Poland
- Voivodeship: Greater Poland
- County: Poznań
- Gmina: Czerwonak

Population (2014)
  - Total: 1,147
- Time zone: UTC+1 (CET)
  - Summer (DST): UTC+2 (CEST)
- Vehicle registration: PZ

Bolechowo-Osiedle is a village in the administrative district of Gmina Czerwonak, within Poznań County, Greater Poland Voivodeship, in west-central Poland. It is the seat of Solaris Bus & Coach, a Polish bus, coach, trolleybus and tram manufacturer.
