= Mielno, Bytów County =

Mielno
- Village
- Location within Poland
- Coordinates: 53°56′52″N 17°27′09″E
- Country: Poland
- Voivodeship: Pomeranian
- County: Bytów
- Gmina: Lipnica
- Population: 68

Mielno [ˈmjɛlnɔ] is a village in Gmina Lipnica, Bytów County, Pomeranian Voivodeship, in northern Poland.

From 1975 to 1998 the village was in Słupsk Voivodeship.
