= Mielno, Poznań County =

Mielno
- Village
- Location within Poland
- Coordinates: 52°29′N 17°4′E
- Country: Poland
- Voivodeship: Greater Poland
- County: Poznań
- Gmina: Czerwonak

Mielno [ˈmjɛlnɔ] is a village in the administrative district of Gmina Czerwonak, within Poznań County, Greater Poland Voivodeship, in west-central Poland.
