= Dziewicza Góra (Greater Poland Voivodeship) =

Hill in Gmina Czerwonak, Poland

Coordinates: 52.480062°N 17.011342°E

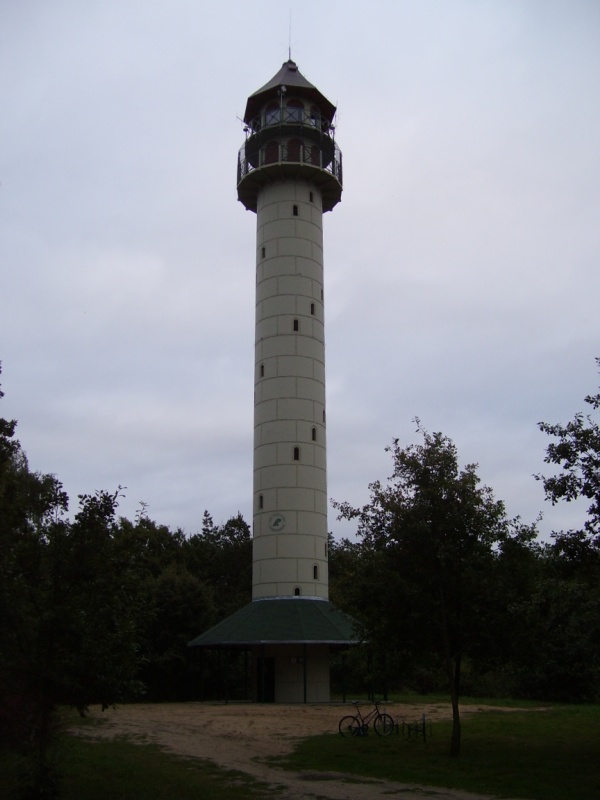
Observation tower on Dziewicza Góra

Dziewicza Góra is a hill close to Czerwonak, a few kilometres north-east of the city of Poznań in western Poland. It lies at the south-western extreme of Puszcza Zielonka Landscape Park, and is the Park's highest point, at 143 metres (469 ft) above sea level.

Its name (originally Dziewcza Góra) literally means Virgin Hill. It derives from the Cistercian nuns who were granted the hill in 1242.

An observation tower, with a height of 40 metres (130 ft), was built at the summit of the hill in 2005. This is used for forest fire observation, and is also open to the public at certain times, offering wide views of the surrounding countryside and the city of Poznań.

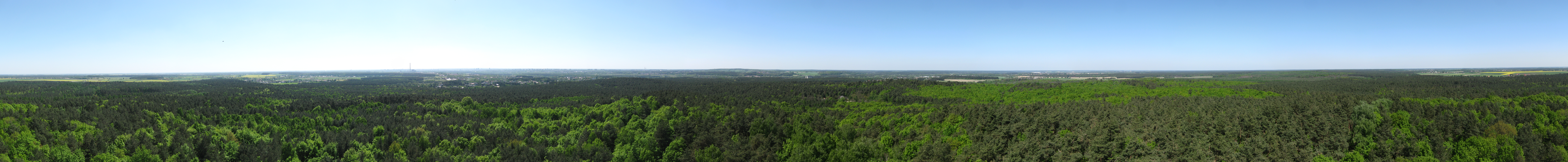
Panorama from the observation tower on Dziewicza Góra hill
