= Metropolitan Region Amsterdam =

Metropolitan Region Amsterdam Metropoolregio Amsterdam
- Metropolitan region
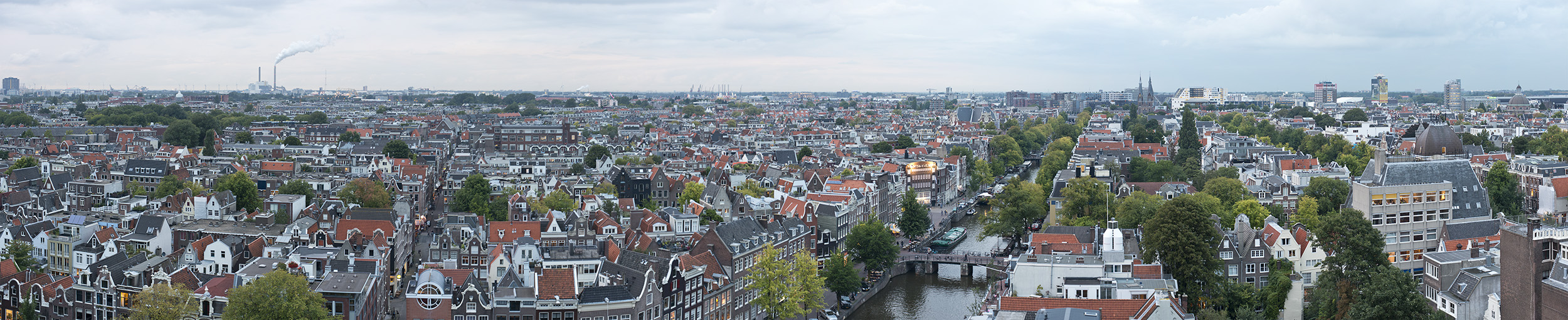
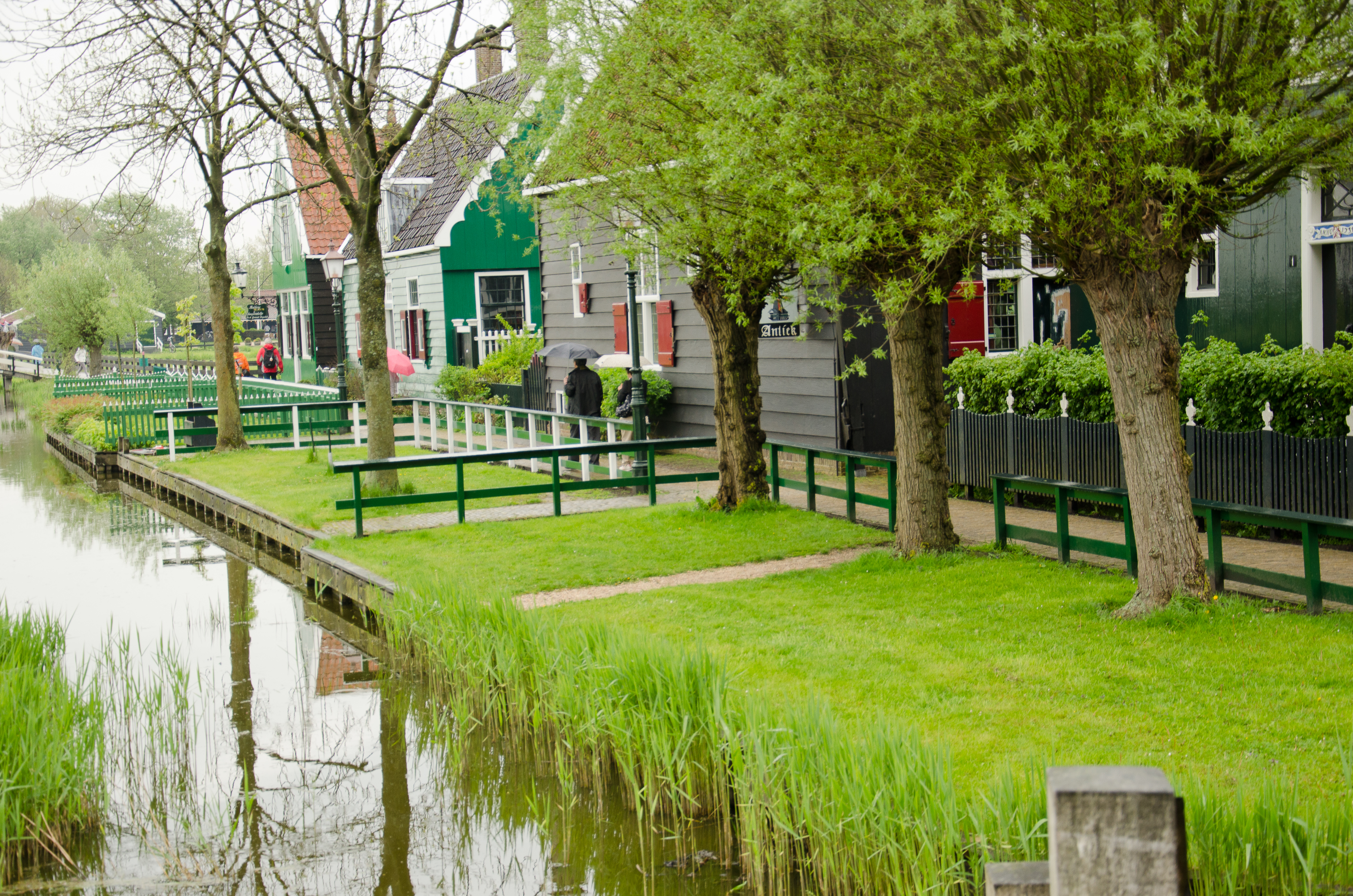
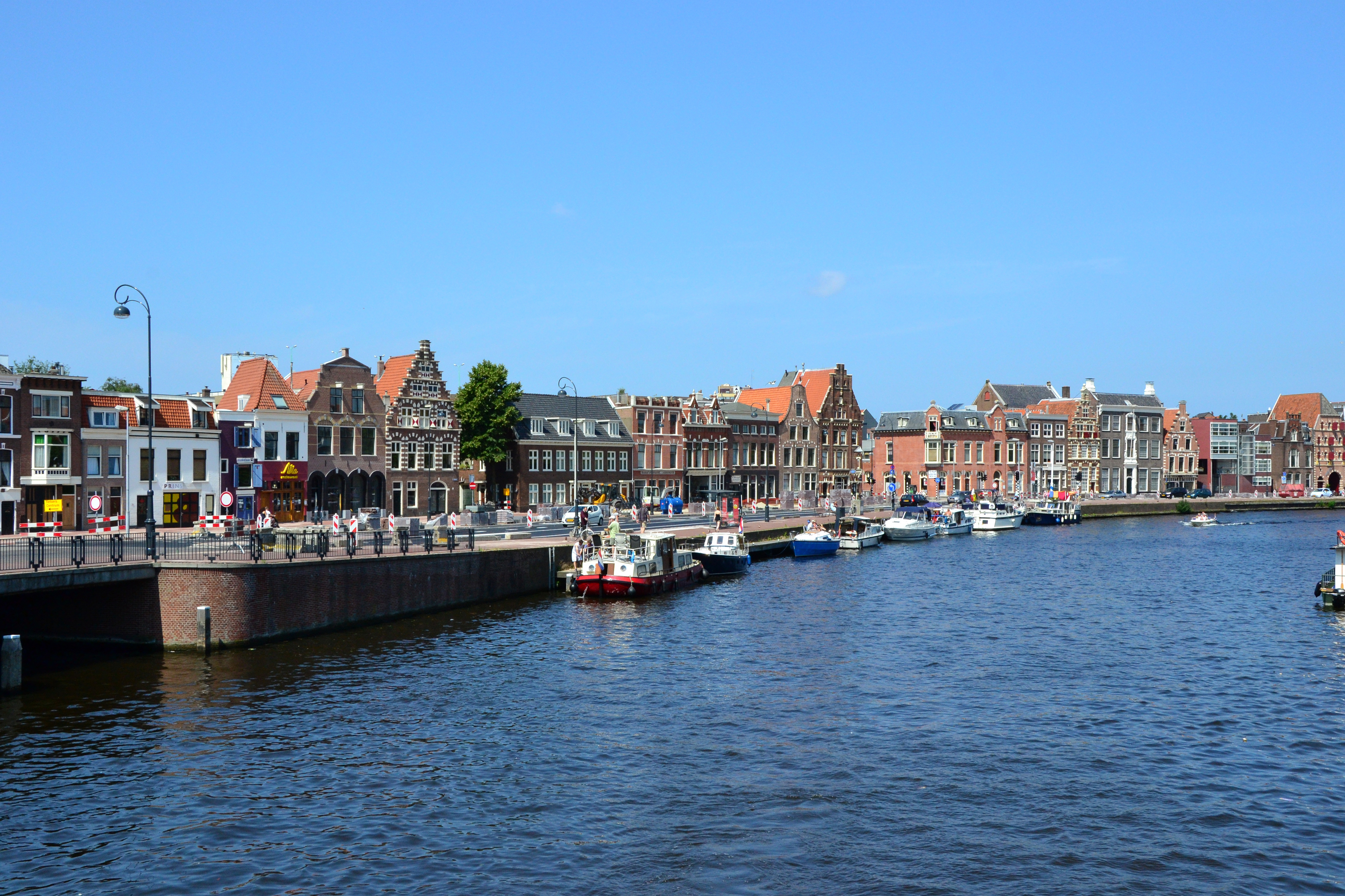
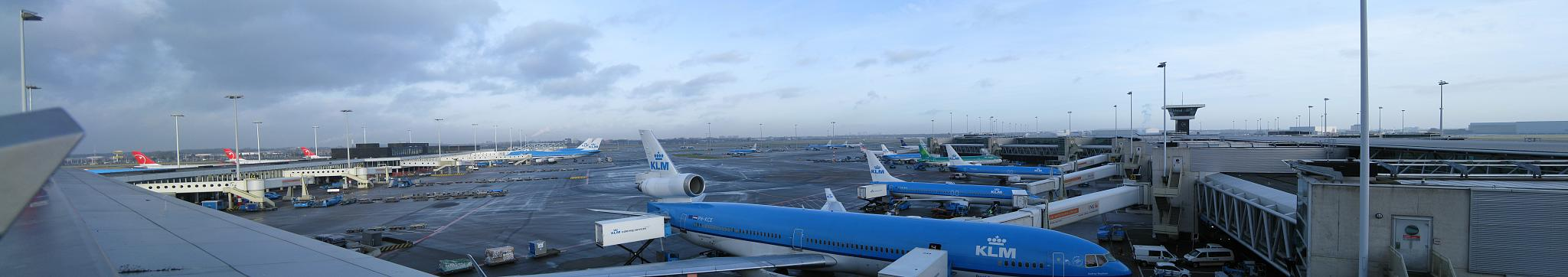
- Amsterdam Zaanse Schans Haarlem Schiphol

- Flag Coat of arms
- Motto(s): Heldhaftig, Vastberaden, Barmhartig (Valiant, Steadfast, Compassionate)
- Interactive map of Metropolitan Region Amsterdam
- Coordinates: 52°22′00″N 4°54′00″E
- Country: Netherlands
- Provinces: North Holland; Flevoland
- Core city: Amsterdam
- Satellite cities: Almere, Haarlem, Zaanstad, Haarlemmermeer, Hilversum, Amstelveen, Purmerend, Lelystad, Velsen, Gooise Meren, Huizen, Beverwijk, Heemskerk, Aalsmeer

Area
  - Metropolitan region: 2,580.26 km^{2} (996.24 sq mi)
  - Urban (Note: Amsterdam Urban Region (SG) Municipalities: Amsterdam · Almere · Zaanstad · Haarlemmermeer · Amstelveen · Purmerend · Diemen · Waterland · Wormerland · Ouder-Amstel · Landsmeer · Oostzaan · Muiden · Zeevang): 1,140.2 km^{2} (440.2 sq mi)
  - Agglomeration (Note: Amsterdam Agglomeration (GA) Municipalities: Amsterdam · Zaanstad · Amstelveen · Diemen · Wormerland · Landsmeer · Oostzaan): 448.44 km^{2} (173.14 sq mi)
  - Municipality (Note: Municipality of Amsterdam Boroughs: Amsterdam-Centrum · Amsterdam-Noord · Amsterdam Nieuw-West · Amsterdam-Oost · Amsterdam-West · Amsterdam Westpoort · Amsterdam-Zuid · Amsterdam-Zuidoost): 219.32 km^{2} (84.68 sq mi)

Population (2026)
  - Metropolitan region: 2,674,819
  - Density: 1,036.65/km^{2} (2,684.90/sq mi)
  - Urban: 1,575,263
  - Urban density: 1,381.6/km^{2} (3,578.2/sq mi)
  - Agglomeration: 1,112,165
  - Agglomeration density: 2,480.1/km^{2} (6,423.4/sq mi)
  - Municipality: 871,873
  - Municipality density: 3,975.3/km^{2} (10,296/sq mi)
- Demonym: Amsterdammer

GDP
  - Metropolitan region: €201.100 billion (2022)
- Time zone: UTC+1 (CET)
  - Summer (DST): UTC+2 (CEST)
- Area codes: 020, 036, 023, 075, 0252, 0297, 0299, 0320, 0294, 035, 0251,
- GeoTLD: .amsterdam
- Website: www.metropoolregioamsterdam.nl

The Metropolitan Region Amsterdam (Dutch: Metropoolregio Amsterdam) is the city region around the city of Amsterdam, the capital of the Netherlands. It lies in the Noordvleugel (English: "North Wing") of the larger polycentric Randstad conurbation area and encompasses the city of Amsterdam as well as 36 further municipalities within the two provinces of North Holland and Flevoland, with a total population of over 2.6 million inhabitants.

The administrative responsibility for the Metropolitan Region Amsterdam lies with the Metropolitan Region Amsterdam Central Administration (BKG).

== Members ==
- Aalsmeer
- Almere
- Amstelveen
- Amsterdam
- Beverwijk
- Blaricum
- Bloemendaal
- Diemen
- Edam-Volendam
- Gooise Meren
- Haarlem
- Haarlemmermeer
- Heemskerk
- Heemstede
- Hilversum
- Huizen
- Landsmeer
- Laren
- Lelystad
- Oostzaan
- Ouder-Amstel
- Purmerend
- Uitgeest
- Uithoorn
- Velsen
- Waterland
- Wijdemeren
- Wormerland
- Zaanstad
- Zandvoort

== See also ==
- Randstad
- Haaglanden
- Rijnmond
- Drechtsteden
- Brabantse Stedenrij
- Metropoolregio Eindhoven
- City Region Arnhem Nijmegen
