= Trolleybuses in Chișinău =

Public transit system in Chișinău, Moldova

Chișinău trolleybus system
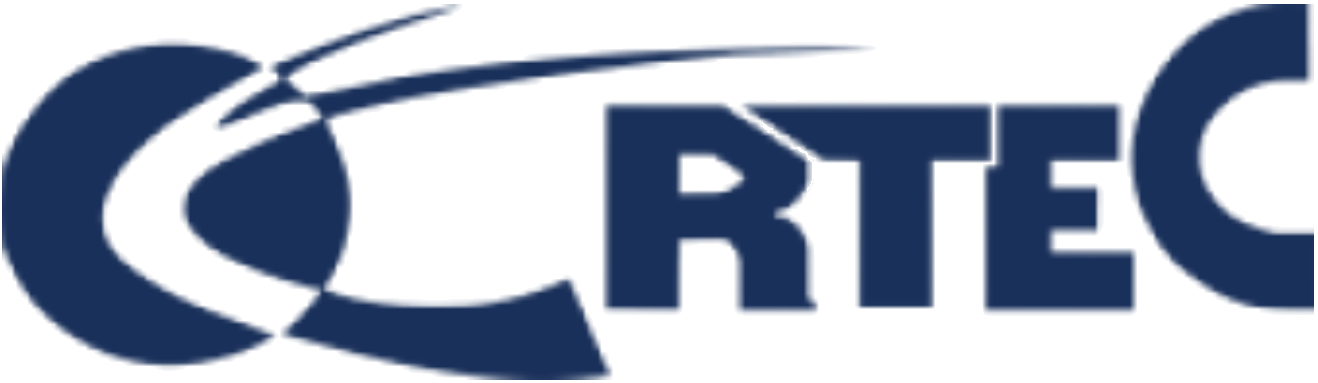

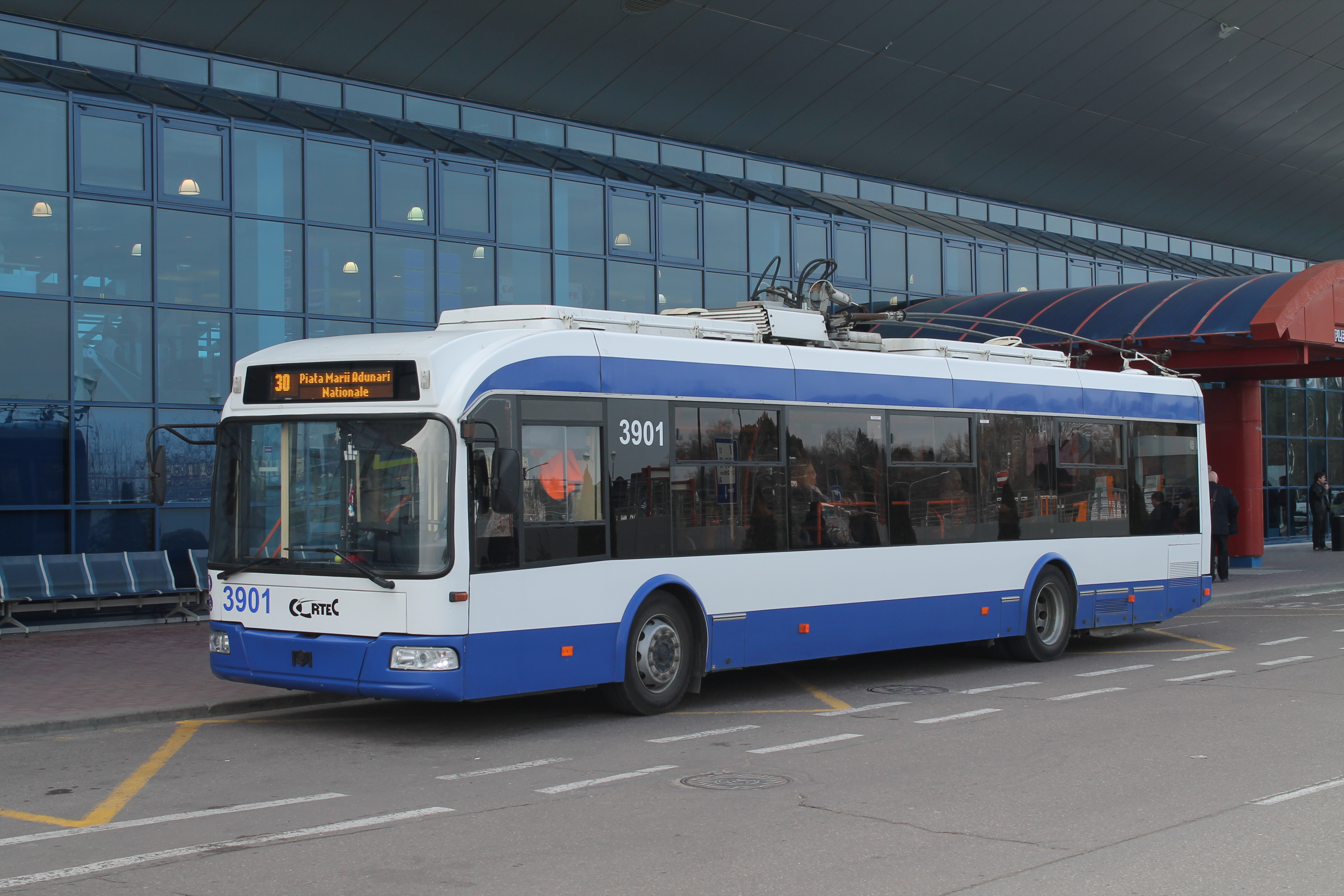
- BKM-321 trolleybus in front of the airport, Chișinău, Moldova

Operation
- Locale: Chișinău, Moldova
- Open: 1949
- Status: Open
- Routes: 32
- Owner: Government of Chișinău
- Operator: Regia Transport Electric Chișinău (RTEC)

Infrastructure
- Electrification: 600 V DC
- Depot: 3
- Stock: 435

Statistics
- Route length: 285 km (177 mi)
Overview
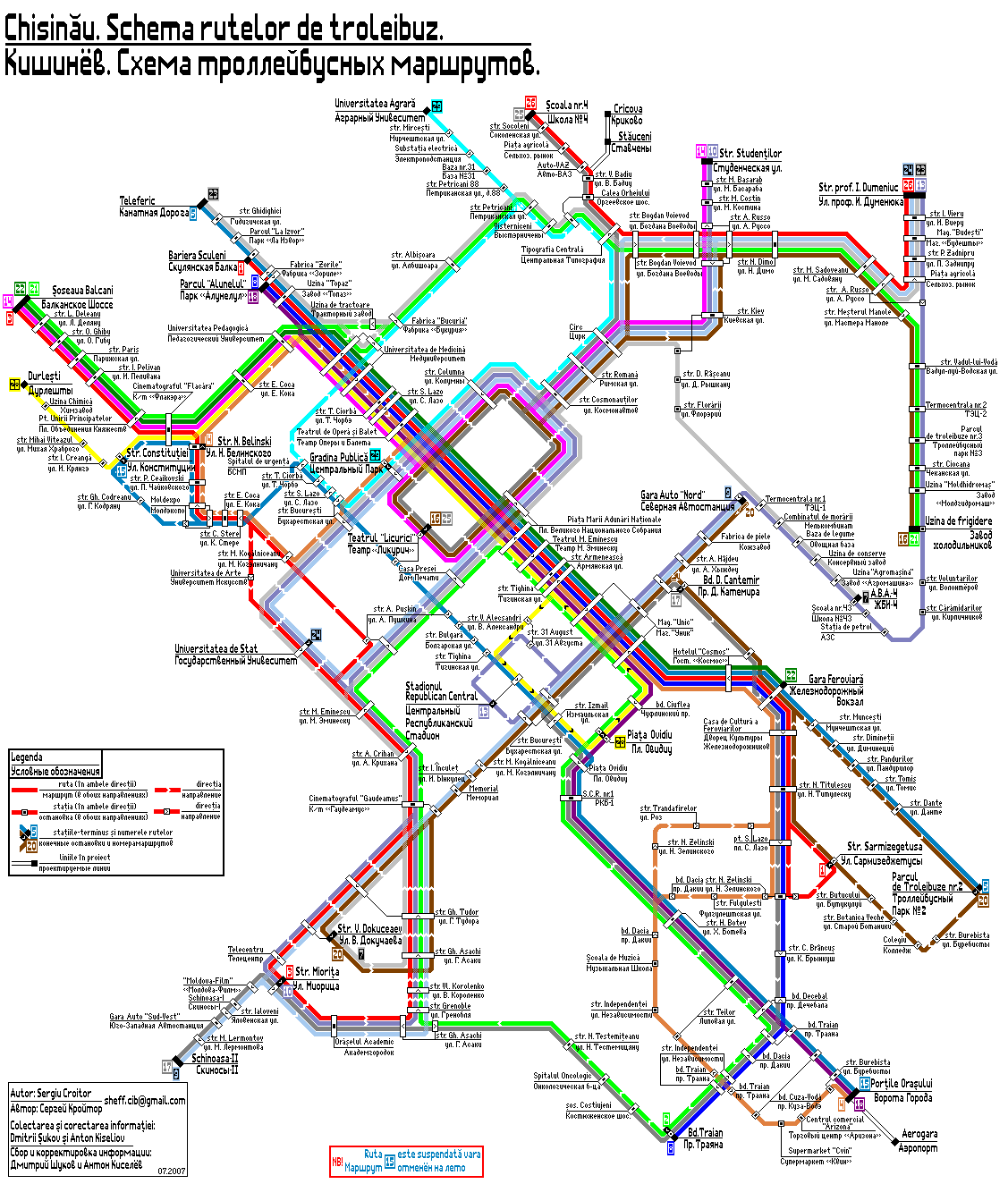
Chisinau trolleybus network map, 2013.
- Website: https://rtec.md/ (in Romanian)

The Chișinău trolleybus system forms an important part of the public transport network in Chișinău, the capital of Moldova. The system was created shortly after the end of the World War II to replace the old electric tram system that suffered extensive damage during the war. Along with the network of minibuses known as rutiere, it forms the backbone of the Chișinău transport system, with the average daily ridership reaching 250,000 passengers per day and accounting for half of the journeys made in Chișinău.

== History ==
The history of the trolleybus network in Chișinău goes back to 1949 when the city council took the decision to introduce it as a substitute for the tram network that was heavily damaged during World War II and could only be rebuilt to a limited extent. The first line connecting the Chişinău Railway Station with the University of Medicine ran along the Stephen the Great boulevard, where the former tram tracks were removed, and was served by six MTB-82d units. In 1959 the tram depot was transferred to serve the trolleybus system that comprised over 50 units at that time, and by 1961 trolleybuses had completely replaced the trams. The second and the third depots were introduced into service in 1966 and 1986, respectively.

== Lines ==
As of March 2026 the Chișinău trolleybus network consists of 32 lines covering all the city districts and the suburban areas such like Durlești, Stăuceni, Trușeni and Bubueci.

Line	Route	Notes
1	or. Durlești – str. Sarmizegetusa	connection with Chisinau railway station
2	bd. Traian – str. Pușkin	circular route
3	șos. Balcani – str. Miorița	
4	Grădina Botanică – str. Constituţiei	connection with Chisinau railway station
5	Trolleybus depot 2 – str. Bariera Sculeni	connection with Chisinau railway station
7	str. Uzinelor - str. Alexei Mateevici	
8	bd. Traian – parcul "La izvor"	connection with Chisinau railway station
9	Autogara Sud Vest – Autogara Nord	connection with Autogara Nord (North bus station) connection with Autogara Sud (South bus station)
10	str. Studenților – str. Miorița	
12	str. Ion Dumeniuc – str. Alexei Mateevici	
13	str. Ion Dumeniuc – str. Dokuceaev	connection with Autogara Nord (North bus station)
16	Beton Armat Association – str. Alexei Mateevici	
17	Autogara Sud Vest – Gara	connection with Chisinau railway station connection with Autogara Sud (South bus station)
20	Trolleybus depot 2 – str. Vasilii Dokuceaev	connection with Chisinau railway station
21	str. Mesterul Manole– șos. Balcani	
22	șos. Balcani – Grădina Botanică	
23	str. Ion Dumeniuc – parcul "La izvor"	
24	str. Ion Dumeniuc – str. Mioriţa	
25	str. Ceucari – str. Alexei Mateevici	
26	str. Ceucari – str. Ion Dumeniuc	
27	str. Ceucari – str. Ion Creangă	
28	str. Ceucari – Trolleybus depot 2	
29	Universitatea Agrară – parcul "Ștefan cel Mare"	
30	Aeroportul Internațional Chișinău – Piata Marii Adunari Nationale	connection with Chișinău International Airport
32	str. Alexei Mateevici– or. Stăuceni	Suburban route to Stăuceni town
33	Universitatea de Medicina – or. Durlești	
34	str. Tighina – Trușeni	Suburban route to Trușeni village
35	str.Vasile Alecsandri – or. Durlești	
36	Teatrul National Mihai Eminescu – or. Ialoveni	Suburban route to Ialoveni town
37	str. Constantin Negruzzi – Bubueci	Suburban route to Bubueci village
38	str. Alba Iulia – str. Burebista	

Closed lines
Line	Route
6	str. Studenților - or. Durlești
11	str. Studenților - Parcul "La Izvor"
14	str. Studenților - str. Alba-Iulia
15	bd. Dacia - str. Ion Pelivan
18	Parcul "Alunelul" - bd. Dacia
19	str. Studenților - bd. Dacia
31	Teatrul licurici - or. Sîngera

== Fleet ==
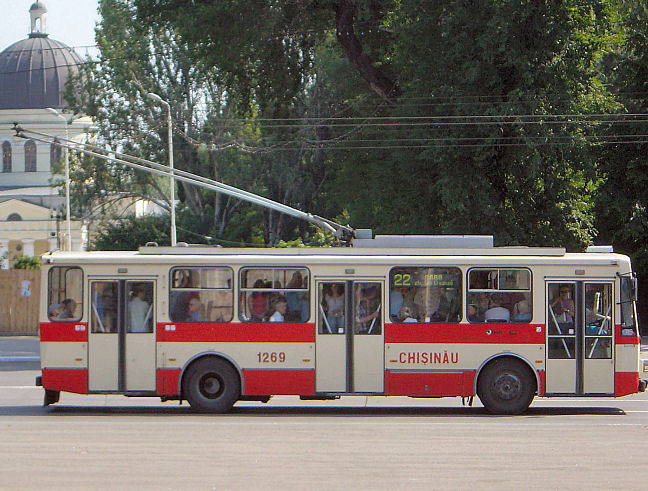
Škoda 14Tr in 2006

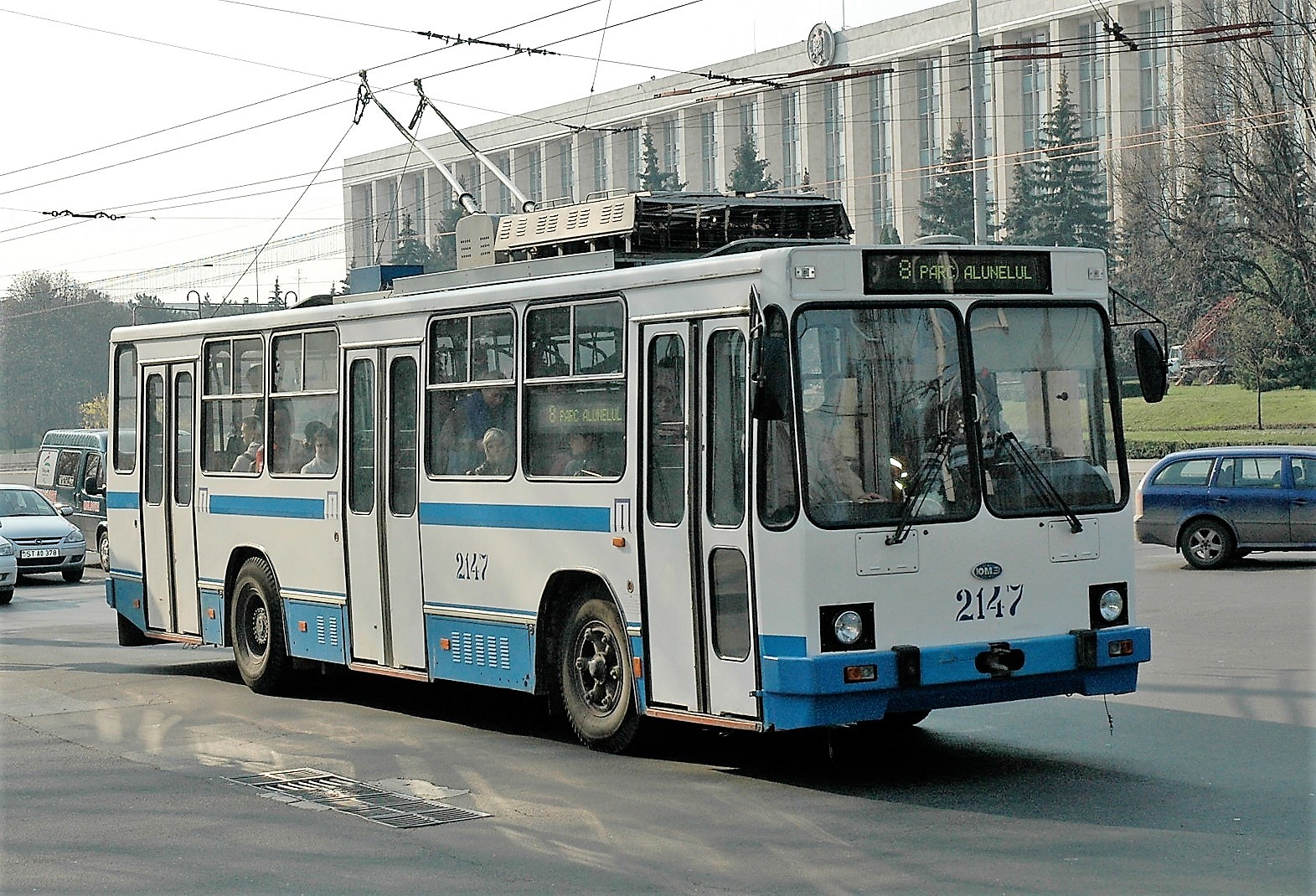
YuMZ T2 in 2009

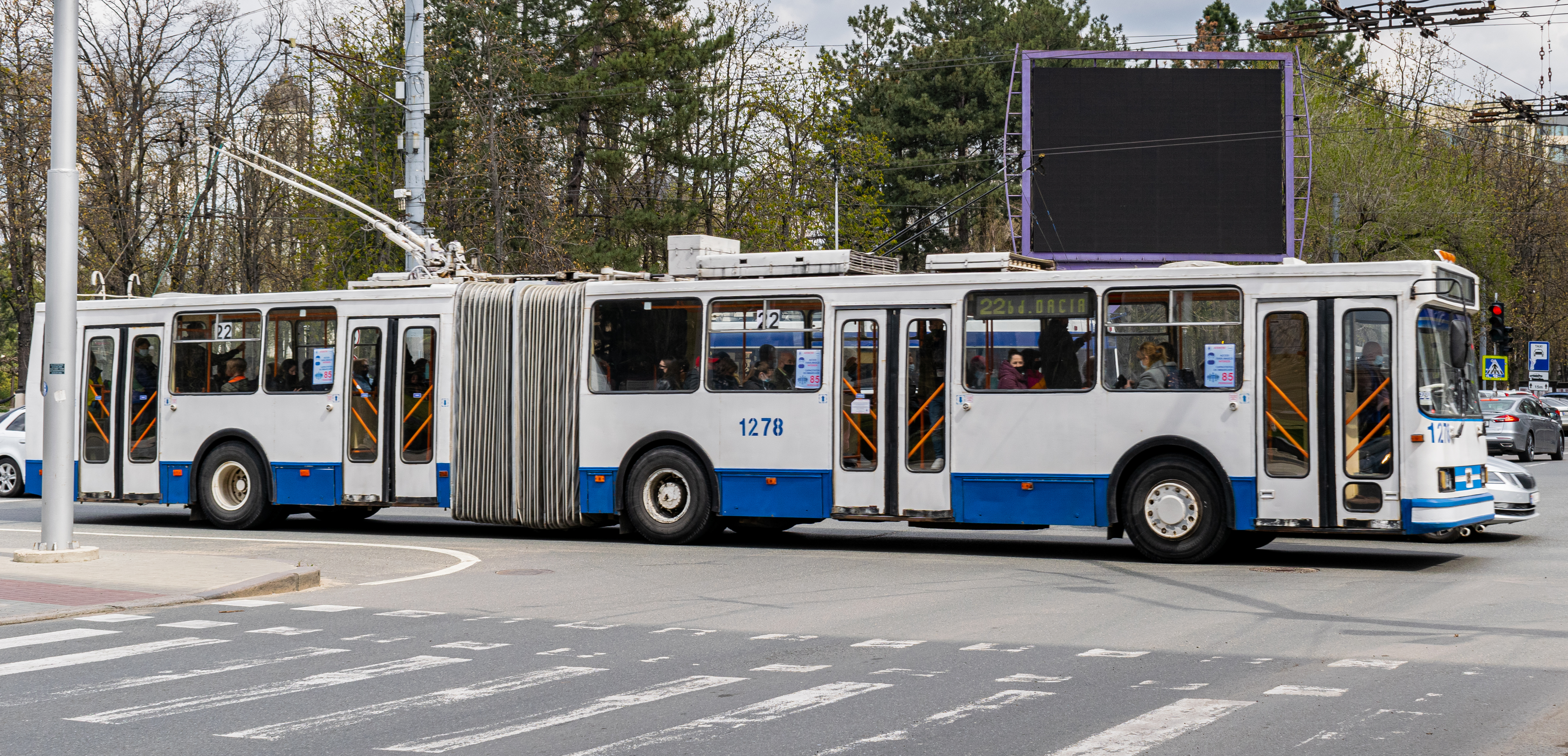
A BKM-213 articulated trolleybus in 2021

=== Current fleet ===
The fleet consists mainly of the various modification of popular low-floor trolleybus BKM-321 manufactured by Belkommunmash in Belarus and it's Moldovan analogue RTEC 62321 equipped by Moldovan electronics. Chișinău is the second-largest current user of this model, after Minsk (and Moscow in past). In addition, the network also operates by 5 articulated vehicles RTEC 62433 (BKM-433), some Škoda 24Tr, articulated Van Hool AG300T and Polish Solaris Trollino 18. All trolleybuses Škoda, Van Hool and Solaris were purchased used as dismissed in Swiss, Latvia and Estonia.

Model	Total / Active / Scrapped
BKM-321 (passenger)	94 / 88 / 0
BKM-321 (service vehicles)	4 / 4 / 0
BKM-32102	1 / 0 / 0
RTEC 62321M2	60 / 60 / 0
RTEC 62321M1	103 / 96 / 0
RTEC 6232100DM3	50 / 50 / 0
Škoda 14TrM	42 / 0 / 13
ZiU-682V variants	381 / 2 / 377
Škoda 24Tr Irisbus Citelis 1B	41 / 31 / 0
YuMZ T2	22 / 0 / 21
ZiU-682G variants	61 / 3 / 57
ZiU-683V01	7 / 0 / 5
BKM-433 Vitovt Max II	5 / 5 / 0
Solaris Trollino II 18m AC	10 / 10 / 0
Solaris Trollino II 18m Ganz	28 / 27 / 0
BKM-213	2 / 0 / 0
RTEC 624201M1	1 / 1 / 0
VMZ-5298.00 (VMZ-375)	3 / 0 / 2
YuMZ T1	4 / 0 / 3
Solaris Trollino III 18m AC	12 / 12 / 0
Solaris Trollino III 12m AC	14 / 6 / 0
Solaris Trollino II 12m Ganz	8 / 0 / 0
Van Hool AG300-T	9 / 7 / 0
APTS Phileas Trolley VDL	2 / 0 / 0
KTG(Kyiv-1 (service vehicle)	5 / 1 / 1
MTB-82d	59 / 1 / 58
ZiU-5	14 / 1 / 13
Informbusiness EV203 (experimental)	1 / Unknown / Unknown
MaZ-203T (vehicle kit)	1 / 0 / 0
Škoda 21tr (transferred to Szeged, Hungary in 2000)	0 / 0 / 0
ROCAR 312E (transferred to another city, current location and status is unknown)	0 / 0 / 0
ZiU-682B	12 / 0 / 11 (possibly 12 scrapped, but this is currently unconfirmed)
ZiU-682UG	1 / 0 / 0 (also likely 1 scrapped, but this is also unconfirmed)

In 2021, two trolleybuses built by the now-defunct Dutch manufacturer APTS (Advanced Public Transport Systems), to its Phileas design, were acquired secondhand: A 2011 prototype for a planned new busway system in Pescara, Italy, and a 2014 prototype (with doors on both sides) for the Metromare busway then under construction in Rimini, Italy. Neither ever entered service on the systems for which they had been purchased, and eventually they were sold to a dealer in secondhand vehicles. They were given fleet numbers 1001 and 1002 in Chișinău, and No. 1001 entered service in June 2022.

=== Past fleet ===
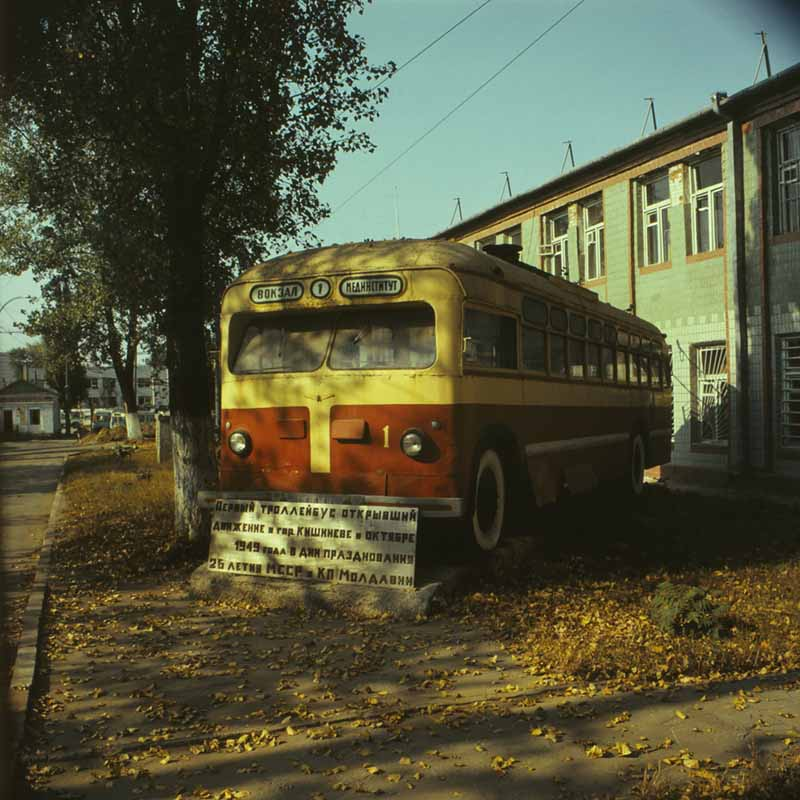

In past in Chișinău operated the Soviet-built ZiU-5 and ZiU-9, Czech Škoda 14Tr and Ukrainian-built trolleybuses YuMZ-T2. There were also 2 articulated BKM-213 in service (operated since 2005 until 2025) and several articulated ZiU-683.

== Managing company and Depots ==
All trolleybuses in Chișinău are managed by Municipal Company RTEC (Regia Transport Electric Chișinău/Chișinău Electric Transport Managing Company).
There 3 trolleybus depots in the city and one special car service brach for repairing of vehicles.
- Trolleybus depot 1 - located in Buiucani Administrative District. The Headquarter of RTEC is situated here.;
- Trolleybus depot 2 - was built in Botanica Administrative District - a great resident and industrial area;
- Trolleybus depot 3, built in 1985 - the newest one. Located in Ciocana Administrative District.
- Repair Service - located very closed to the Depot 1. Occupies territory of ex tram depot.

== Tickets, prices and payment terms ==
As of March 2026, the standard fare is 7 MDL. In addition to being able to purchase single tickets aboard their bus, passengers are able to purchase one-, three-, and six-month passes at the trolleybus depots, Poșta Moldovei locations, and at local Moldpresa coffee stands.

== Infrastructure ==
Despite the average age of the fleet being under 10 years, the traction stations are over 30 years old on average, with the oldest being in operation for over 60 years. The age of the traction stations means that the system barely keeps up with demand and uses more power than it needs.
Trolleybuses across the city were stranded on 31 January 2026 after power lines in Ukraine were disabled.
