= The Northern Way =

Northern England coloured in blue

The Northern Way was a collaboration initiated in February 2004 between the three northern regional development agencies (RDAs), Northwest Development Agency, One NorthEast and Yorkshire Forward at the instigation of the then Deputy Prime Minister John Prescott to focus on issues important for the whole of the North of England with a dimension larger than could be tackled by one region alone — for example, transport infrastructure, or marketing the North internationally.

The body was tasked to address the £30 billion output gap between the North and the average for England as a whole.

Although originally intended to have a twenty-year lifespan, the initiative's activity came to an end in March 2011, when its parent regional development agencies were wound up by the Conservative-Liberal Democrat coalition government.

== Themes ==
To lead the delivery of its objective, an independently chaired steering group was established whose members had a range of different public and private sector interests. The Steering Group launched Moving Forward: The Northern Way Growth Strategy in September 2004, which focused on four themes:

1. Developing new City Region plans to work across administrative boundaries in the eight major conurbations of the North, namely:
- North East England:
  - Tees Valley - (Teesside, Darlington and Hartlepool)
  - Tyne and Wear - (Tyneside and Wearside)
- North West England:
  - Central Lancashire - (Preston)
  - Liverpool City Region - (Liverpool)
  - Manchester City Region - (Manchester)
- Yorkshire and the Humber:
  - Hull and Humber Ports - (Kingston upon Hull)
  - Leeds City Region - (Leeds)
  - Sheffield City Region - (Sheffield)
2. Key investment priorities were chosen that could exploit economic activity across all three northern Development Agency regions.

These investment priorities are:

- bring more people into employment
- strengthen the North’s knowledge base innovation
- build a more entrepreneurial North
- capture a larger share of global trade: key clusters
- meet employer skills needs
- the North’s connectivity
- create truly sustainable communities
- market the North to the world.
3. Working together differently and collaborating to make the most of £100 million public sector investment in the North and equivalent private sector investment.
4. Influencing local, regional and national decision-makers to ensure their policies and programmes support Northern Way goals.

== Growth fund ==
The Growth Fund, worth £100 million, was launched in September 2004, and in June 2005 the Northern Way published its Business plan, setting out how to spend the money. The eight City Region partnerships published their City Region Development Plans to show how they would work together to grow their economies to address the output gap.
