= Phileas (public transport) =

Bus rapid transit developed by Samenwerkingsverband Regio Eindhoven (SRE)

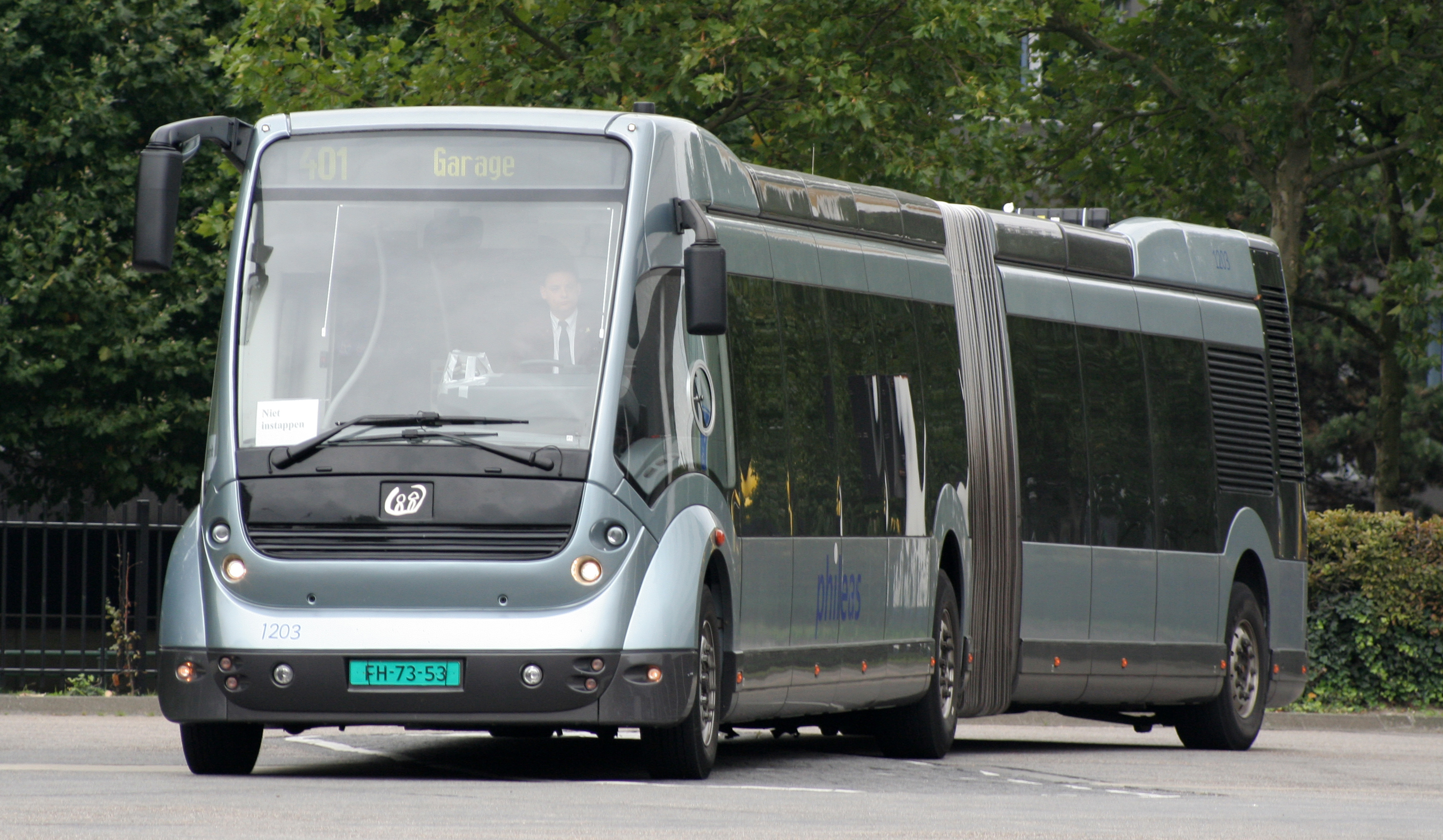

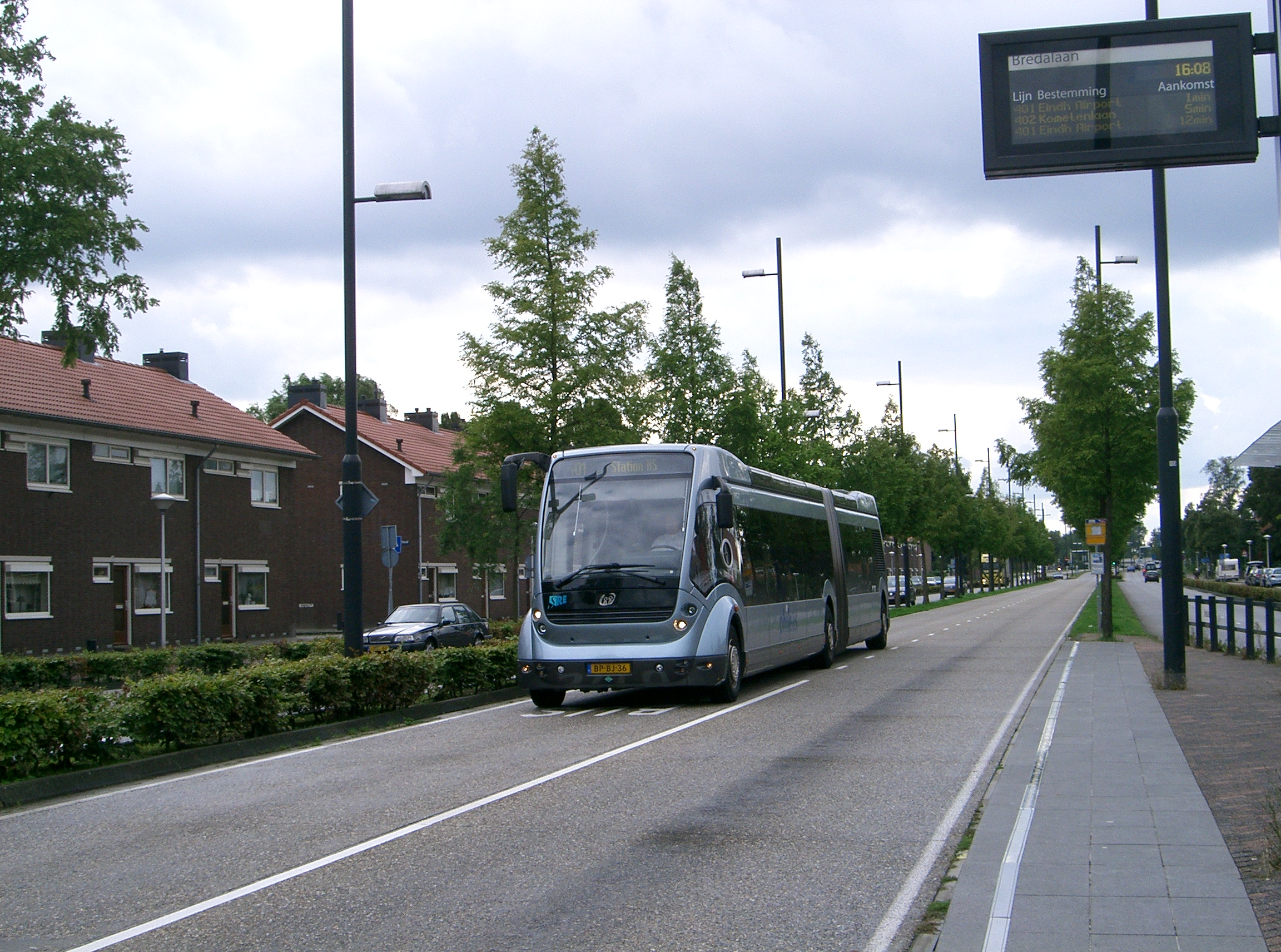
Phileas bus

Phileas is a bus rapid transit, developed by Samenwerkingsverband Regio Eindhoven (SRE), Netherlands, along with other companies for the Cooperation Foundation Eindhoven Region (most prominently; APTS and Bombardier).

Phileas is an advanced guided bus, intended to deliver tram-like public transport at a low cost; the maintenance infrastructures are intended to be cheaper, due to no maintenance of rails and overhead lines.

A major feature of the bus, is the recharging battery by means of electromagnetic induction; which allows the battery to be manufactured in smaller sizes. Thus, the bus is less heavier and less environmentally damaging.

The project has cost more than two billion euros, including infrastructure changes.

Phileas did not live up to expectations. On 25 November 2014, exactly 10 years after its introduction, the manufacturer of the Phileas, Advanced Public Transport Systems (APTS) in Helmond, was declared bankrupt.

== Origin of name ==
Phileas is named after Phileas Fogg, the protagonist in Around the World in Eighty Days by Jules Verne because of the high speed and ability to be on time.

== Navigation ==
The Phileas mainly drives on a bus lane, following a pre-programmed route defined by magnets built into the road. The FROG technique used allowed driverless operation, however, for legal reasons, a driver must always remain present and vigilant - the budget prevented the Phileas from being completely separated from ordinary traffic. However, the regional authority for urban transport in Eindhoven (SRE) decided to stop using the magnetic guidance system.

== Safety ==
The computer systems inside the Phileas buses are designed in accordance with Safety Integrity Level SIL-4. It controls the vehicle's speed and direction and has a triple-redundant, fail-safe architecture. This means that one system consists of three single-board computers in a 2-out-of-3 configuration. Each is installed in a different place in the bus, to avoid a complete system failure in the event of a vehicle collision. Every single computer obtains data from all sensors via two CAN bus connections and compares them with the other two computers' results. In the case of data mismatch, the bus is switched off and the entire system goes into a "safe state", which means that the bus stops and opens its doors.

== License ==
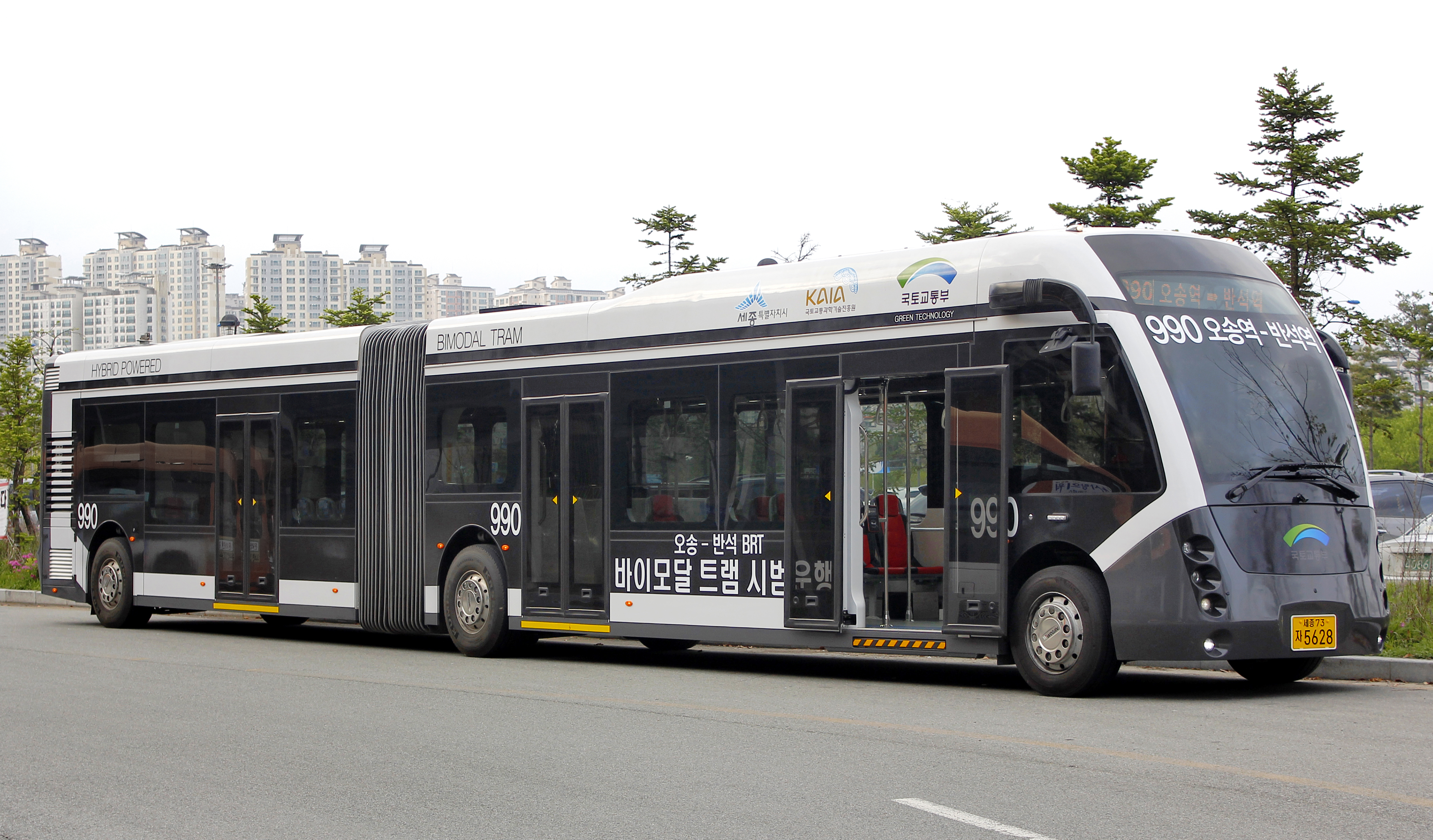
KRRI Variant, also known as Bimodal Tram.

On 3 November 2005, a license & technology transfer agreement was signed between Advanced Public Transport Systems (APTS) and the Korea Railroad Research Institute (KRRI). The KRRI developed the Korean version of Phileas vehicle in May 2011.

In December 2009, APTS, the manufacturer of the Phileas Tram signed a contract with Ballard Fuel Cells of Vancouver to supply zero-emission engines for the Phileas.

The Phileas Trams are in successful operation in the Netherlands, Turkey, Korea, and Israel (Metronit in Haifa). They were also in use for a time in Douai, France, but persistent unreliability led to their replacement by traditional articulated buses just 4 years after their introduction.

Only two Phileas trolleybuses were ever built: A 2011 prototype for a planned new busway system in Pescara, Italy, and a 2014 prototype (with doors on both sides) for the Metromare busway then under construction in Rimini. Neither ever entered service on the systems for which they had been purchased, because the Metromare did not open until 2019, several years after the Phileas design was discontinued, and the planned Pescara trolleybus line has yet to open as of 2024. Both prototypes eventually were sold to a dealer in secondhand vehicles. In 2021, both were acquired by the Chișinău trolleybus system, in Moldova, and one entered service in June 2022.

== Challenges of the Metrobus project in Istanbul ==
Istanbul Metropolitan Municipality purchased 50 Phileas bi-articulated vehicles for €63,278,650 (€1,265,573 per bus) for the Metrobus project; which was the highest order for Phileas at the time. There were several challenges due to faulty design including overcrowding (originally designed for 240 passengers, accommodating up to 300 passengers, exceeding their intended capacity), and challenging terrain (over 7% slopes). In addition, the weak traction axles of the buses frequently cracked and buses needed modifications to continue service. The modification cost for the stronger traction axles was comparatively expensive and was more than €200,000 per bus (competitor buses like the Mercedes Conecto with 185 passenger capacity were sold for approximately €400,000 at that time). Changes were made to accommodate higher passenger traffic.

One of the buses was lost to a fire on the 25 of March, 2015 at E5 road. Around 32 buses are usable and approximately 20 buses are in light use (25,000 km per year) due to their high operating expenses and high failure rates. The remaining buses remain parked at Edirnekapı and Hasanpaşa garages of Istanbul Metropolitan Municipality. They are currently in unusable condition and are used as a source of spare parts.

== See also ==
- Trolleybus
- Bombardier Primove
- ABB TOSA Flash Mobility, Clean City, Smart Bus

== Sources ==
This article incorporates parts of the Dutch Wikipedia entry, nl:Phileas (OV)
