= Brabantse Stedenrij =

- Megalopolis
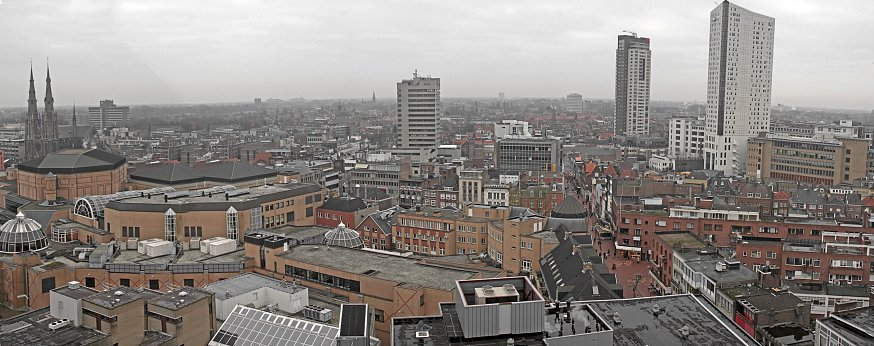
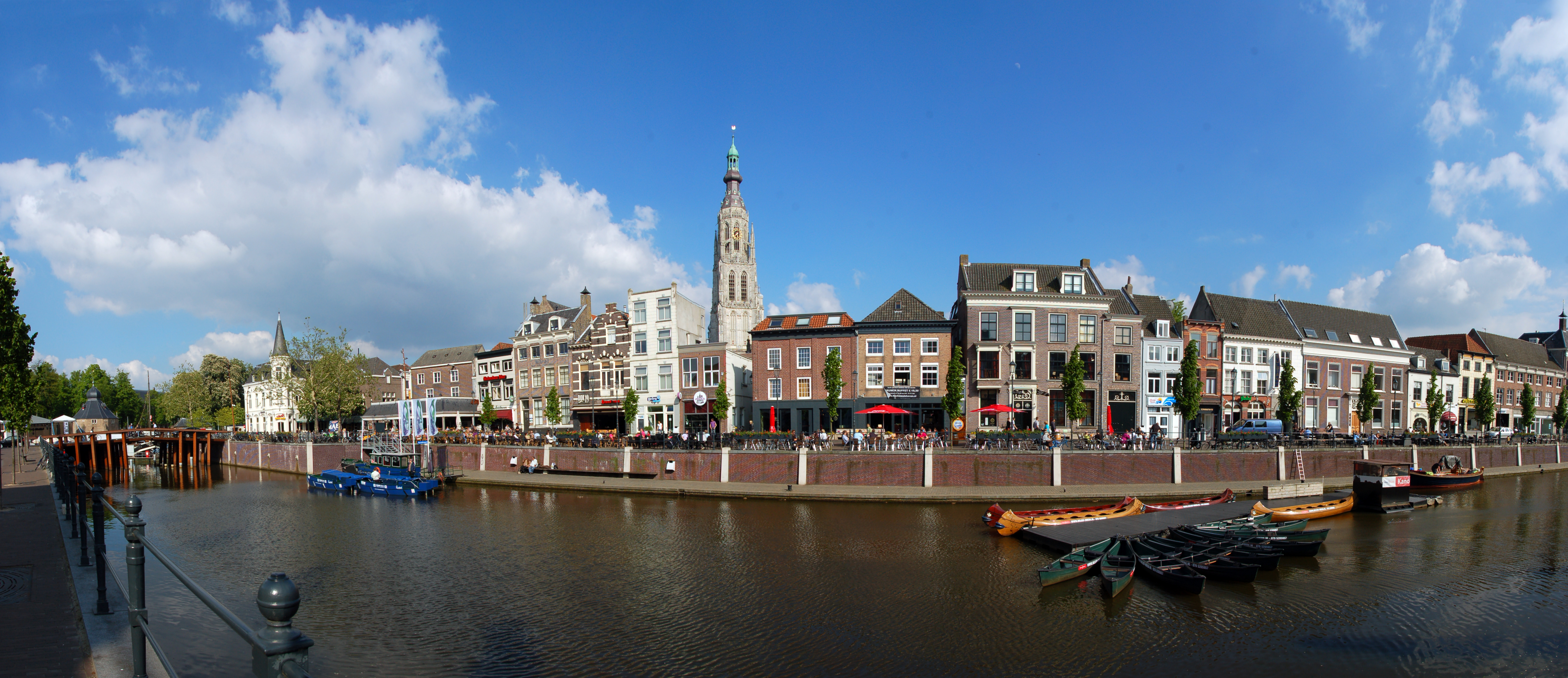
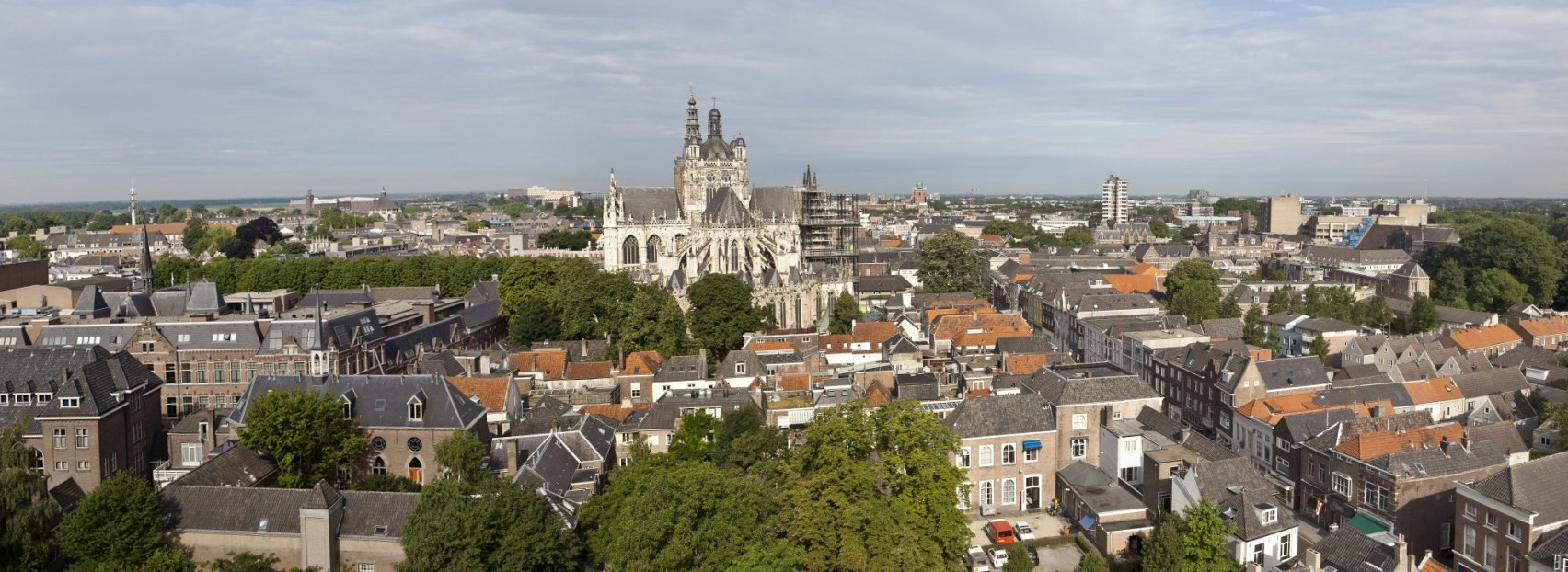
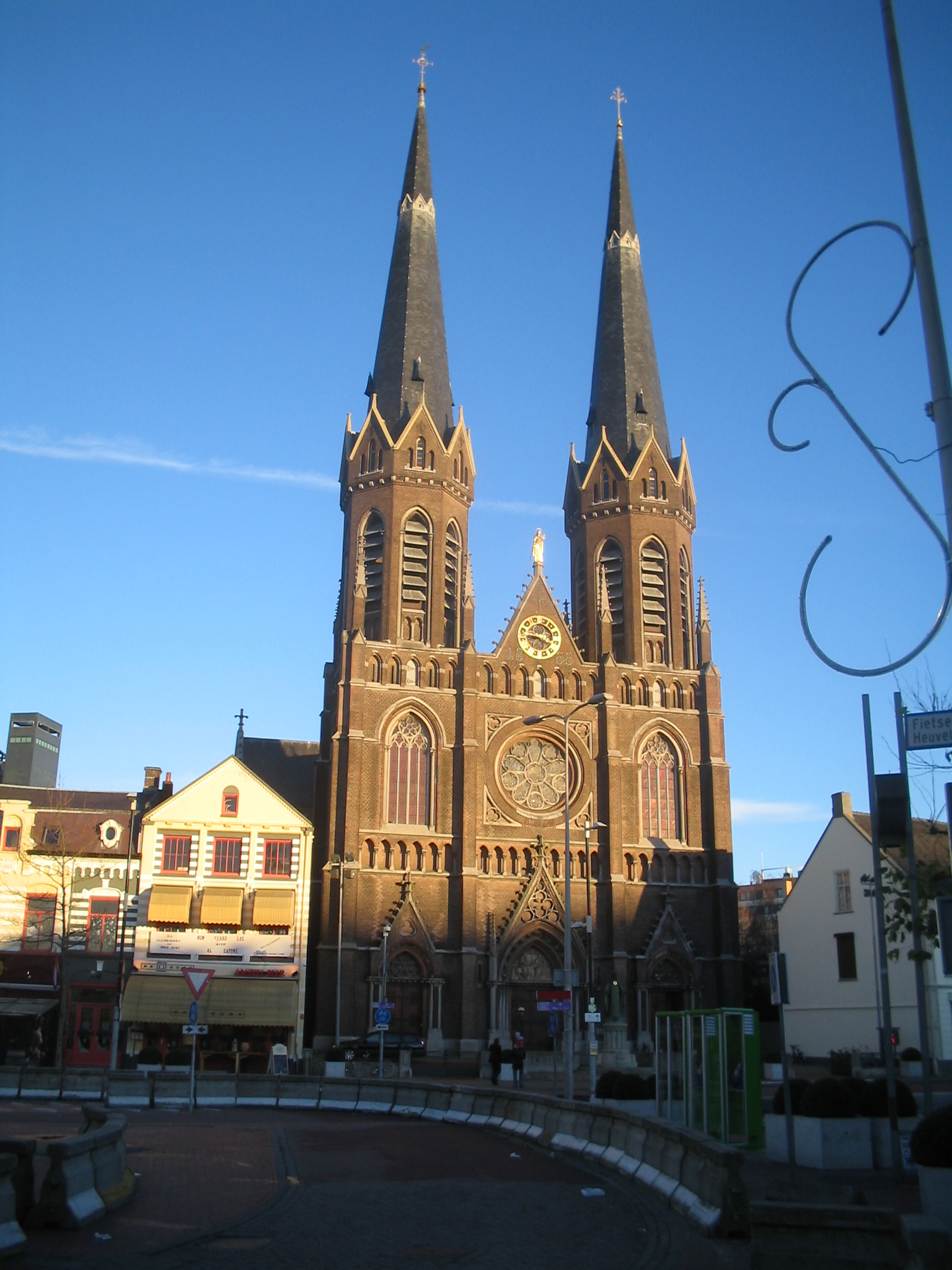
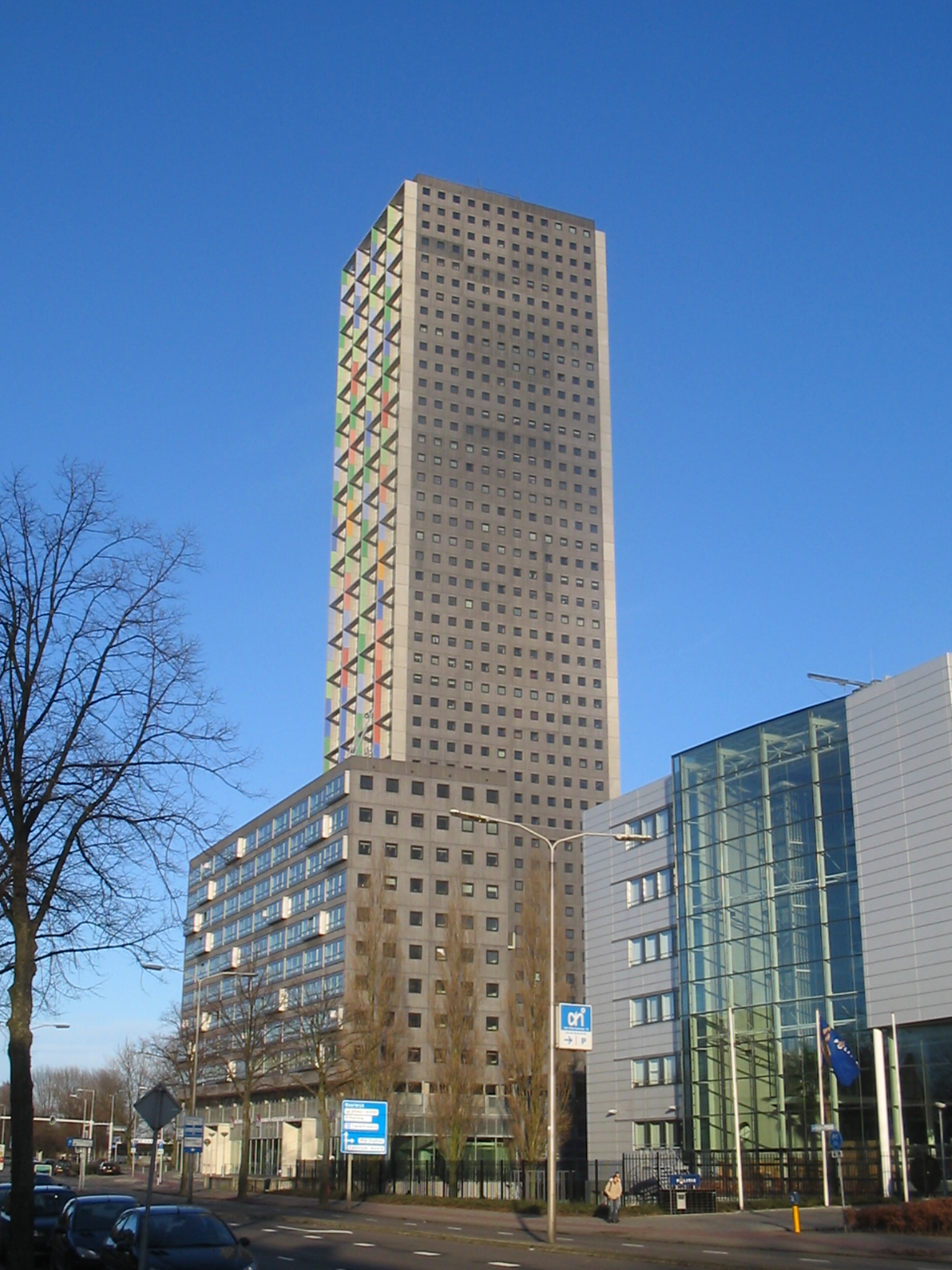
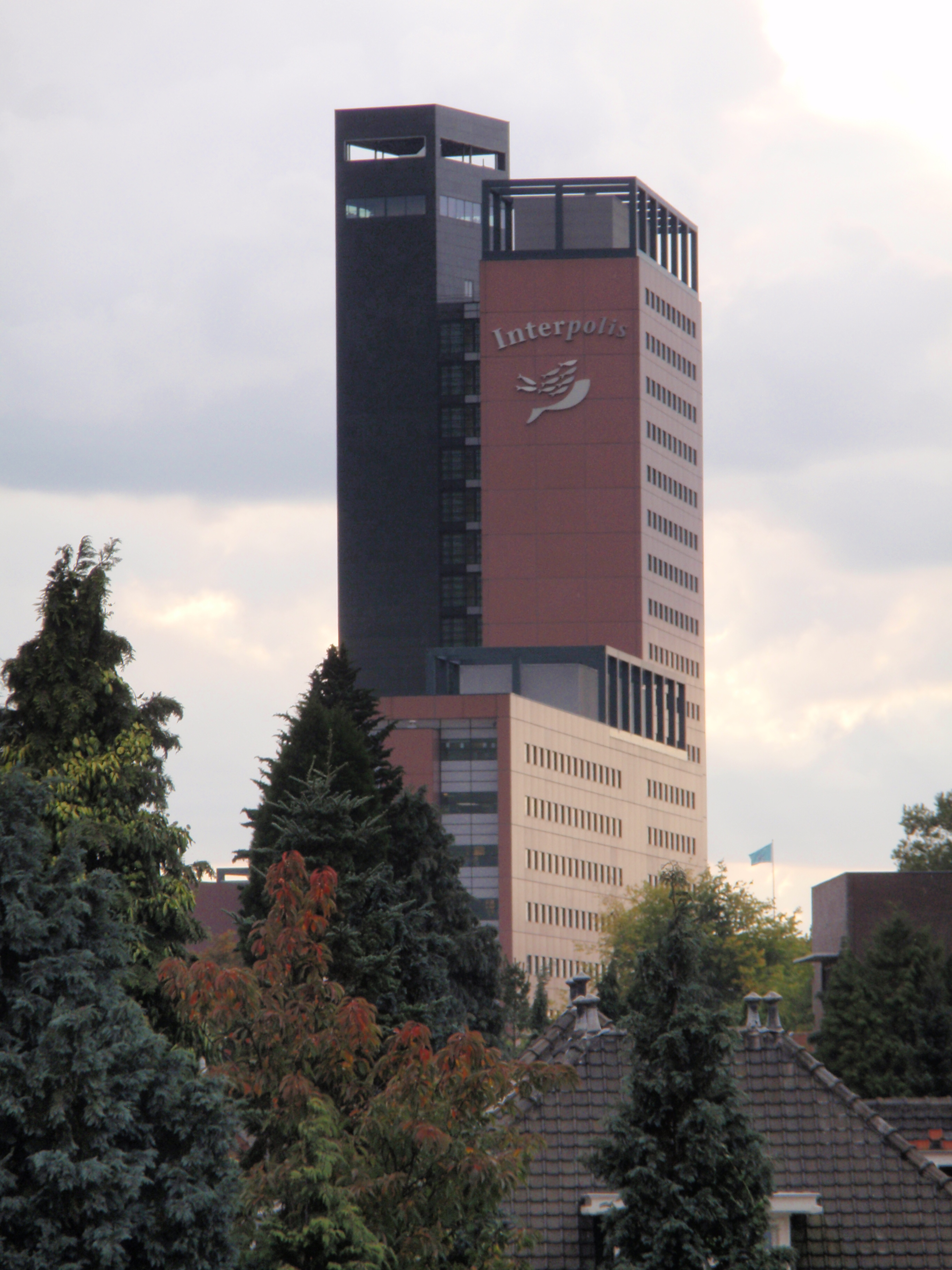
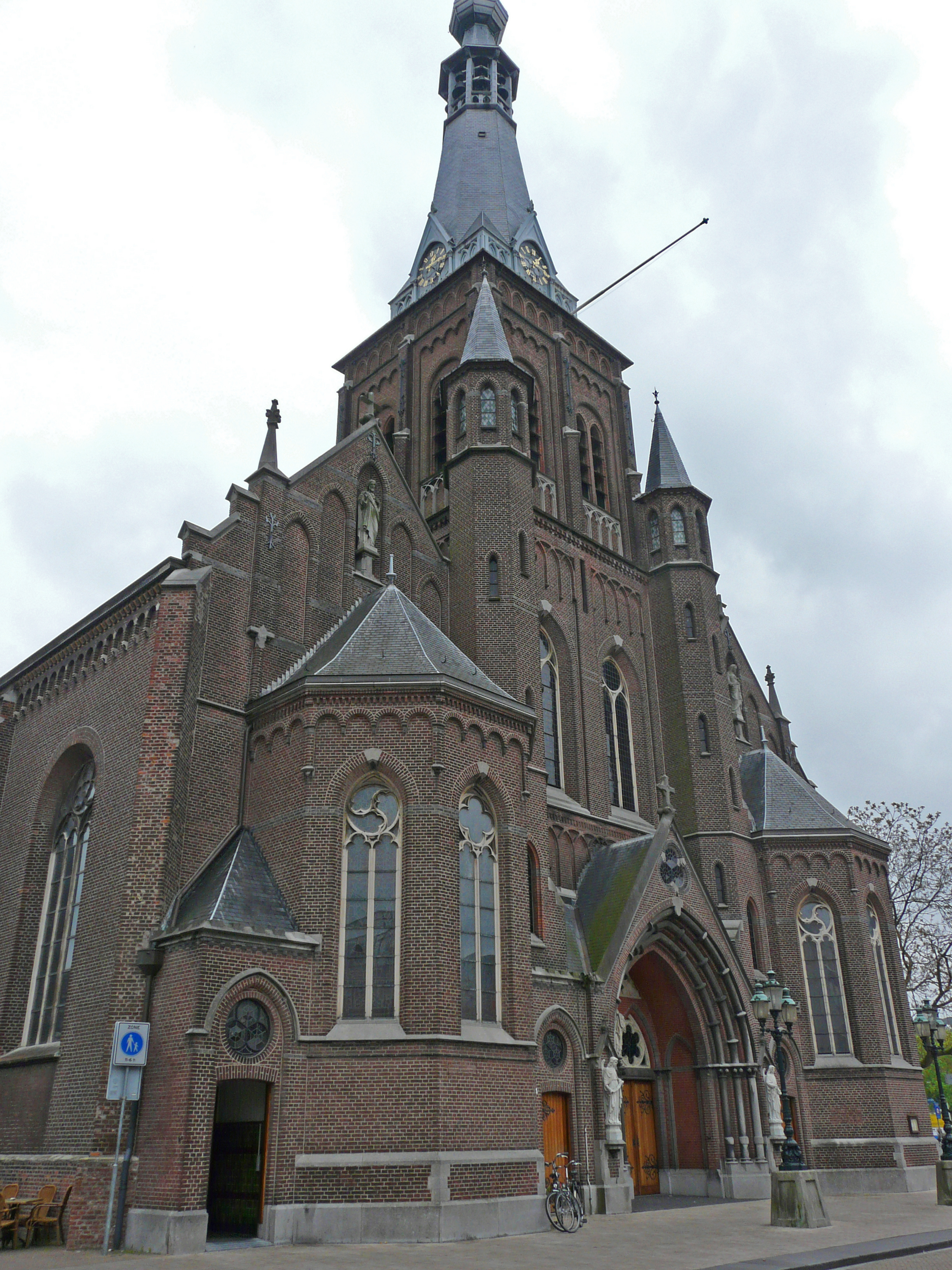
- From top down, left to right: city centre of Eindhoven; Port of Breda, with the Church of Our Lady in the back City centre of 's-Hertogenbosch with the St. John's Cathedral; Tilburg: Joseph Church, Westpoint, Interpolis, Dionysius Church

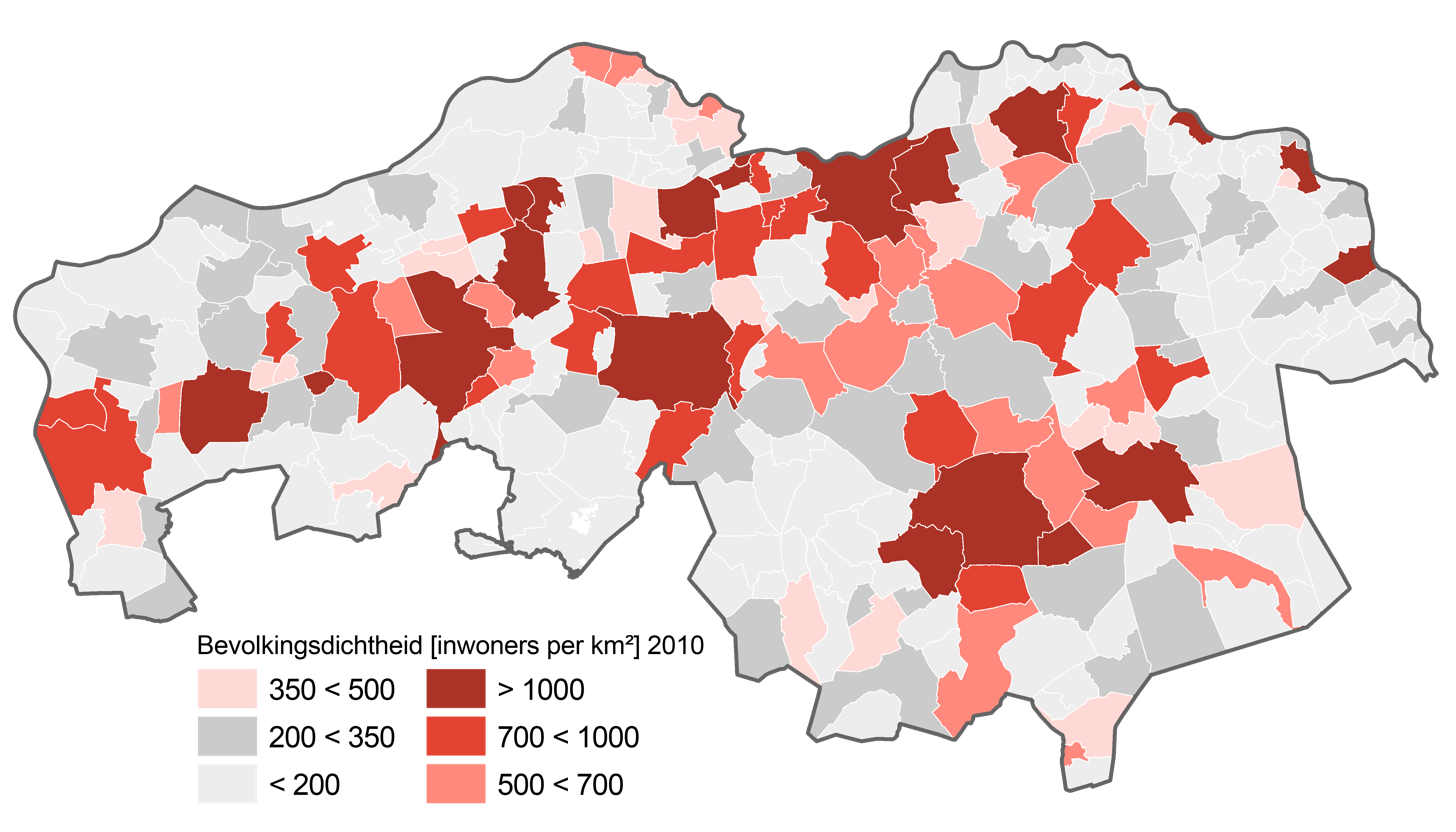
- Coordinates: 51°35′N 5°10′E
- Country: Netherlands
- Province: North Brabant
- Largest cities: Eindhoven; Tilburg; Breda 's-Hertogenbosch
- Other municipalities: List: Helmond; Oss; Roosendaal; Bergen op Zoom; Oosterhout; Waalwijk; Veldhoven; Etten-Leur; Uden; Veghel; Boxtel; Heusden; Geldrop-Mierlo; Valkenswaard

Area
  - CMSA: 2,436.37 km^{2} (940.69 sq mi)
  - Land: 2,375.38 km^{2} (917.14 sq mi)
  - Water: 60.99 km^{2} (23.55 sq mi)

Population (31 August 2015)
  - CMSA: 1,944,588
  - Density: 819/km^{2} (2,120/sq mi)

Brabantse Stedenrij (Dutch pronunciation: [ˈbraːbɑntsə ˌsteːdə(n)ˈrɛi]) is a term used in Dutch urban planning to designate the polycentric city region in the province of North Brabant, Netherlands. Its population is about 2 million. The main cities are 's-Hertogenbosch, Breda, Eindhoven, Helmond and Tilburg. Other municipalities of the area are Bergen op Zoom, Oss and Roosendaal. The metropolitan region also includes other large towns such as Boxtel, Etten-Leur, Oosterhout, Uden, Veghel, Veldhoven and Waalwijk.

The Brabantse Stedenrij is home to many large companies. In science, technology & engineering one finds DAF, VDL, Ciber, Atos, NXP, FEI, GE HealthCare and Thales in Eindhoven, Philips in Best and Eindhoven, ASML and Navteq in Veldhoven, Vanderlande and Alliance Boots in Veghel, Merck & Co., Aspen and B. Braun Medical in Oss, Fujifilm and Tesla Motors in Tilburg, Bosch Rexroth in Boxtel, and Acer Inc. in 's-Hertogenbosch. Also, the area has a rich agriculture and food industry, e.g. Mars Inc., Agrifirm, Royal Canin and FrieslandCampina's DMV in Veghel, Bavaria in Lieshout, Heineken in 's-Hertogenbosch, Coca-Cola in Dongen, Vion in Boxtel, Perfetti Van Melle in Breda and Unilever's Unox in Oss.

== Municipalities ==
Top 20 largest cities and towns of the Brabantse Stedenrij, 2022
Nº	City/town (BAG)	Population	Municipality	Population
1	Eindhoven	225,923	Eindhoven	225,923
2	Tilburg	222,601	Tilburg	222,601
3	Breda	184,762	Breda	184,762
4	's-Hertogenbosch	155,555	's-Hertogenbosch	155,555
5	Helmond	88,515	Helmond	88,515
6	Roosendaal	67,255	Roosendaal	77,415
7	Oss	57,475	Oss	84,635
8	Bergen op Zoom	66,811	Bergen op Zoom	66,105
9	Oosterhout	49,115	Oosterhout	53,995
10	Veldhoven	43,865	Veldhoven	43,865
11	Etten-Leur	42,055	Etten-Leur	42,055
12	Uden	35,280	Uden	40,810
13	Rosmalen	34,340	's-Hertogenbosch	141,895
14	Waalwijk	31,620	Waalwijk	46,430
15	Veghel	31,032	Meierijstad	37,555
16	Valkenswaard	30,660	Valkenswaard	30,660
17	Best	28,700	Best	28,700
18	Geldrop	28,560	Geldrop-Mierlo	38,675
19	Boxtel	25,400	Boxtel	30,280
20	Vught	25,040	Vught	25,785

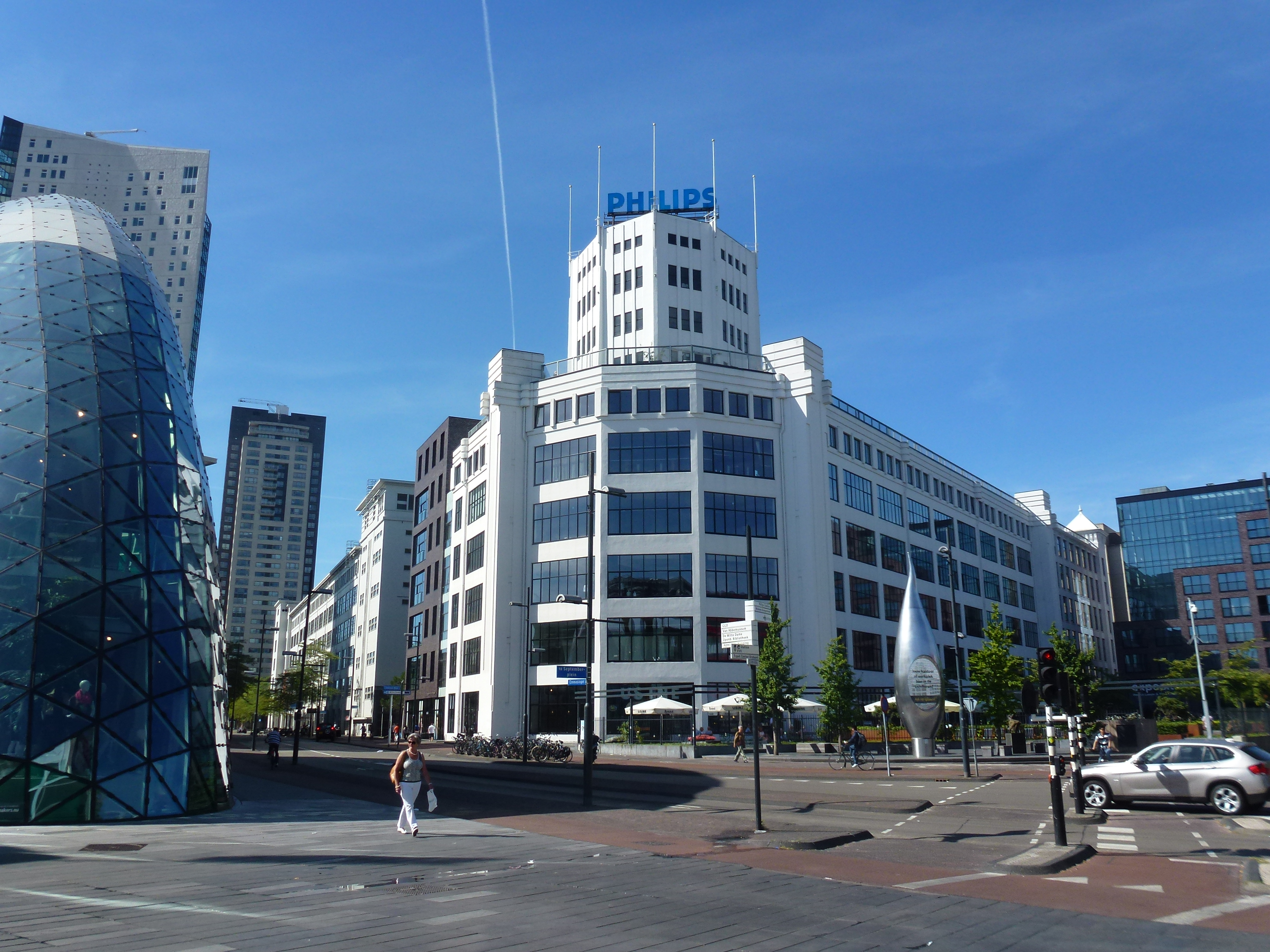
Eindhoven

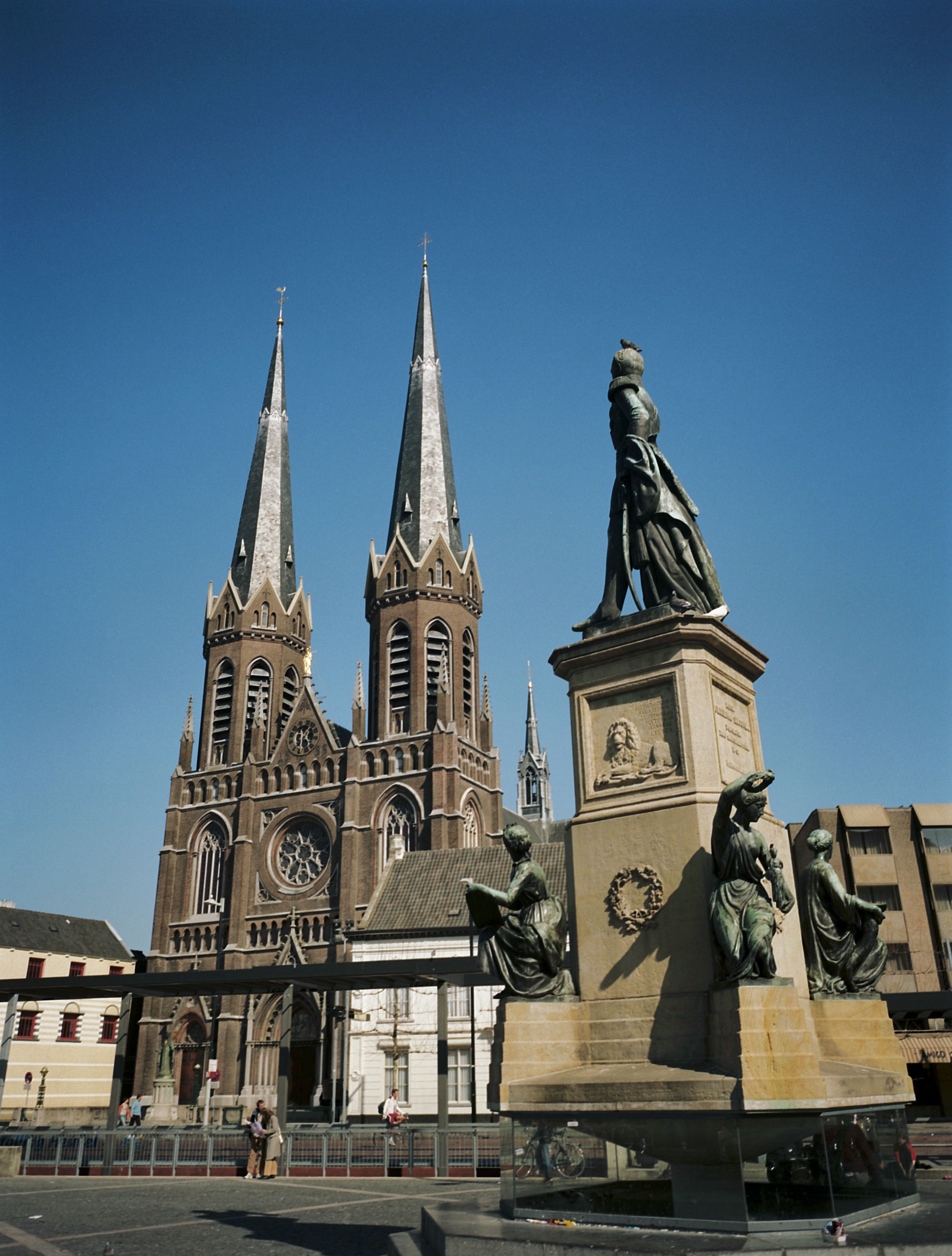
Tilburg

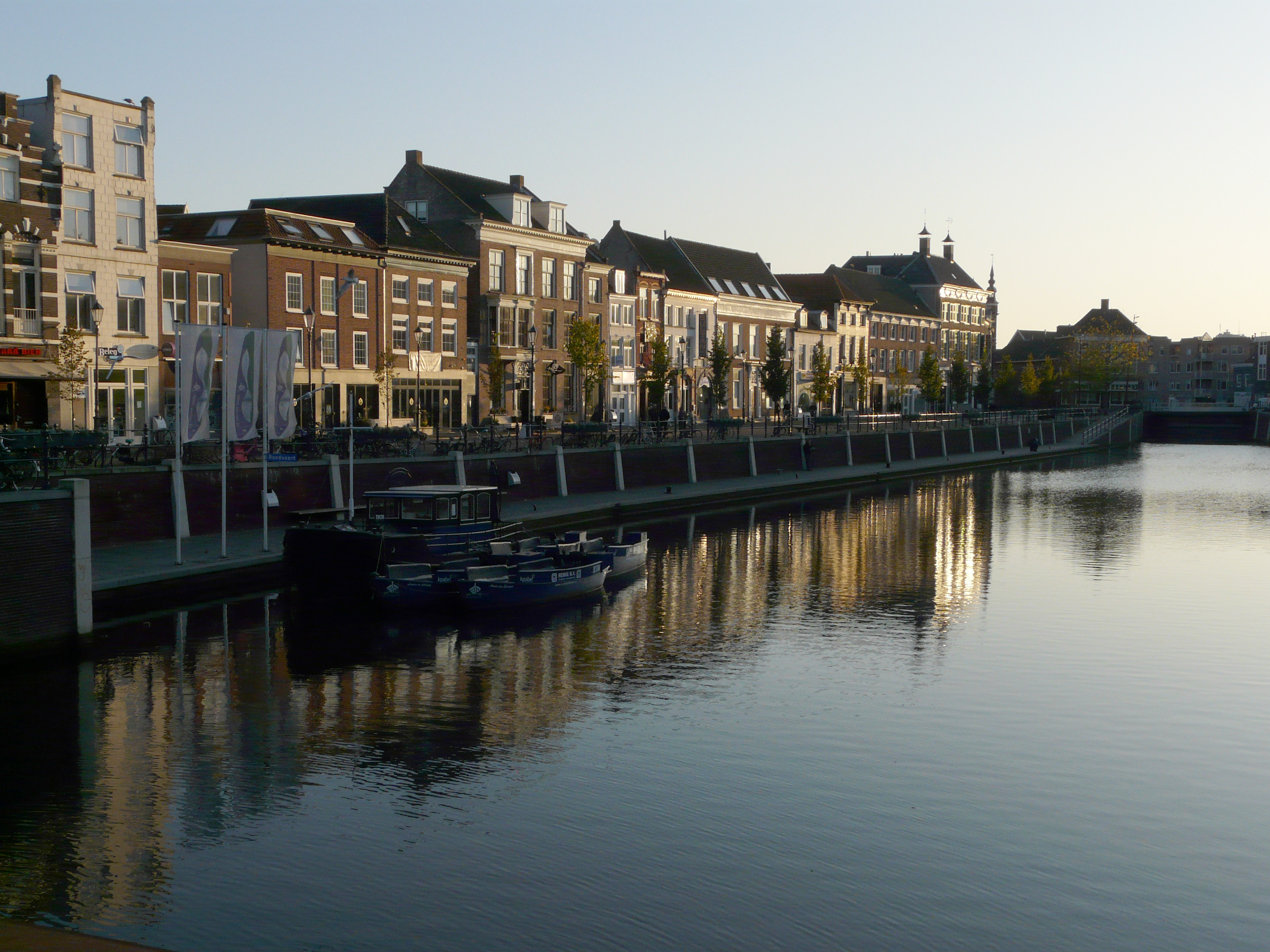
Breda

== See also ==
- Metropolitan area
- Megalopolis
- North Brabant
- BrabantStad
- Randstad
- Eindhoven metropolitan region
- Uden Veghel metropolitan region
