= Metropoolregio Eindhoven =

Eindhoven Metropolitan Region Metropoolregio Eindhoven
- Metropolitan region
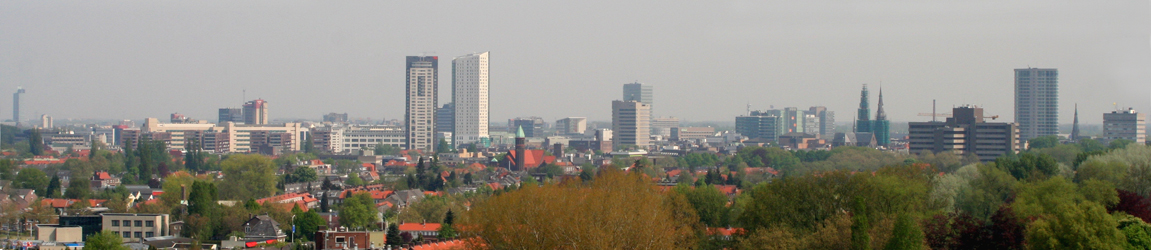
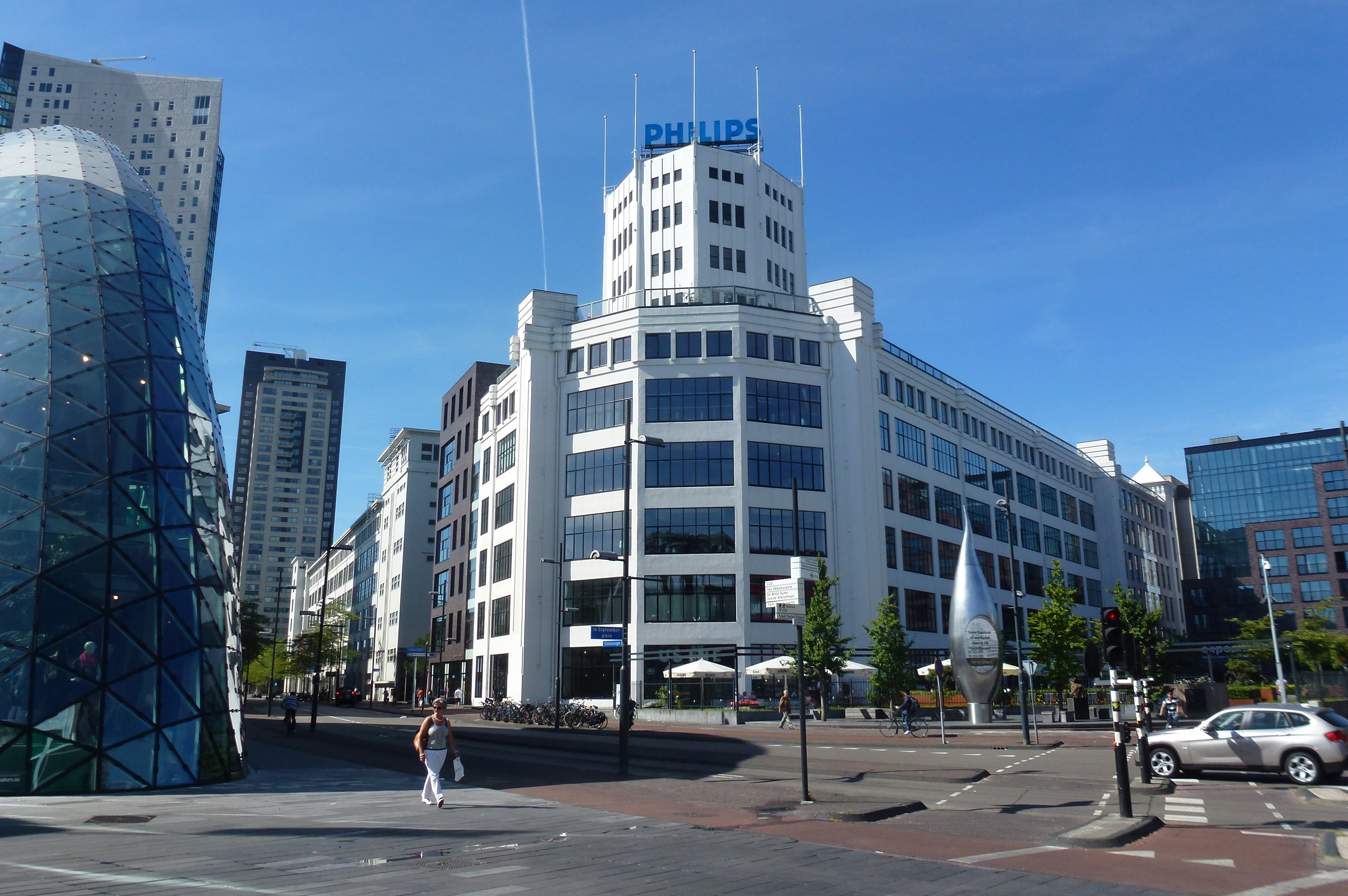
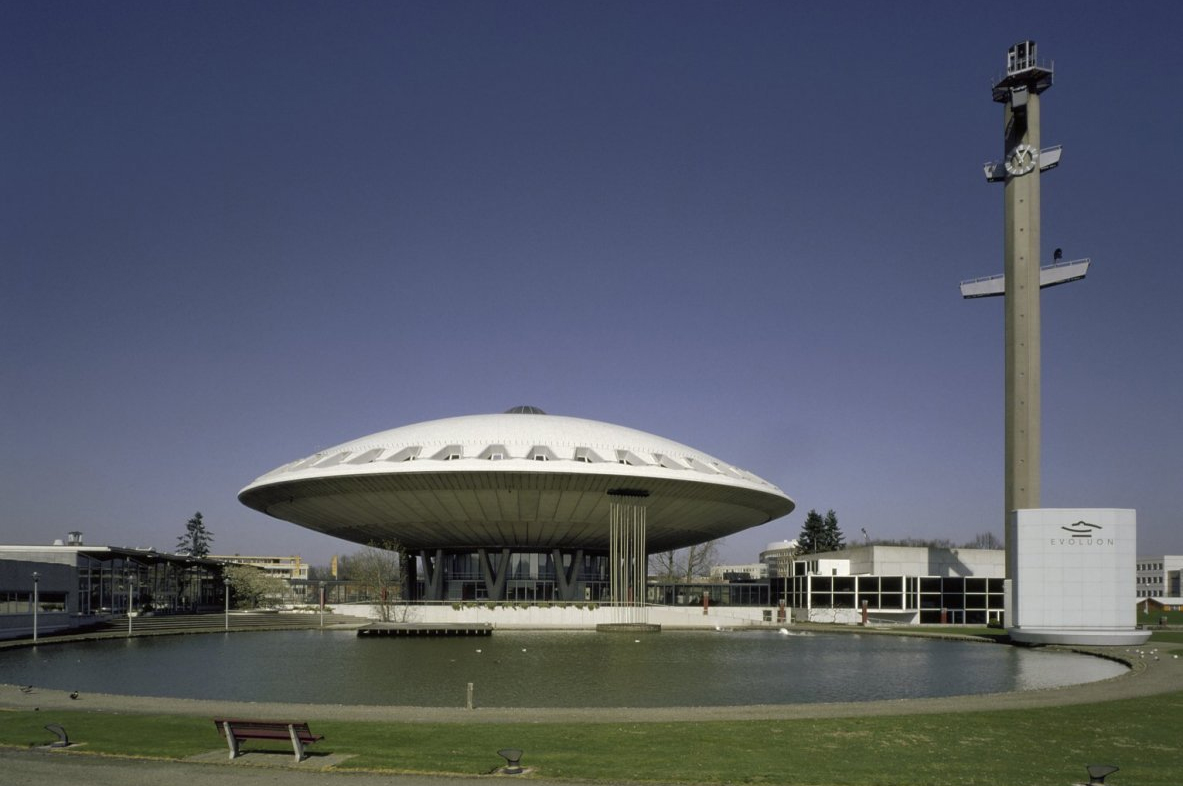
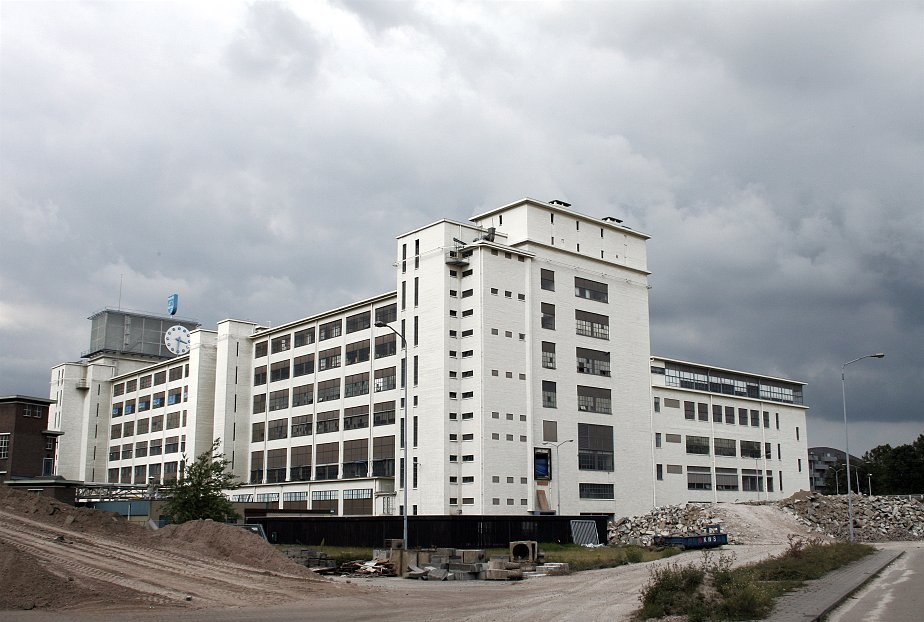
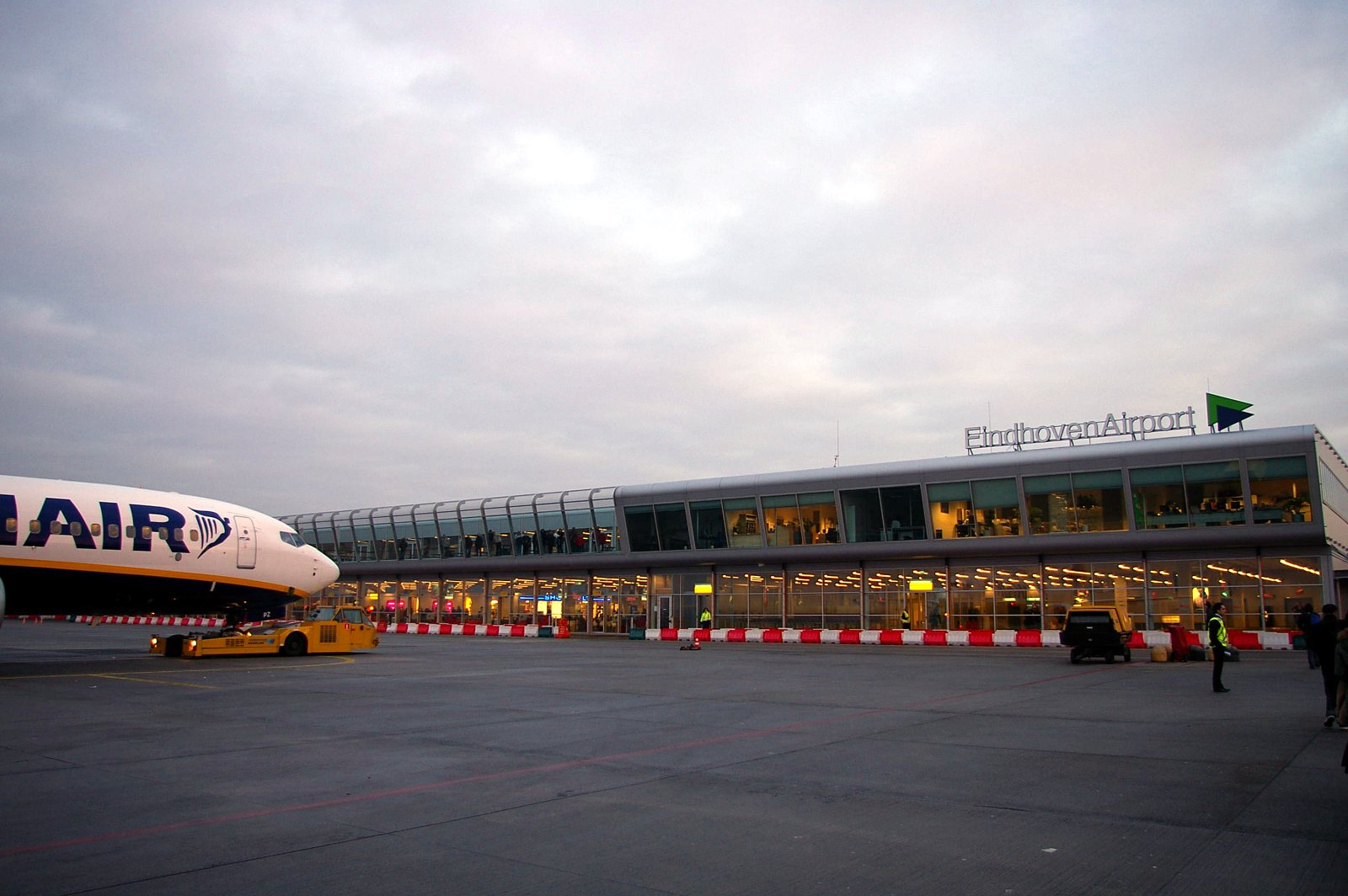
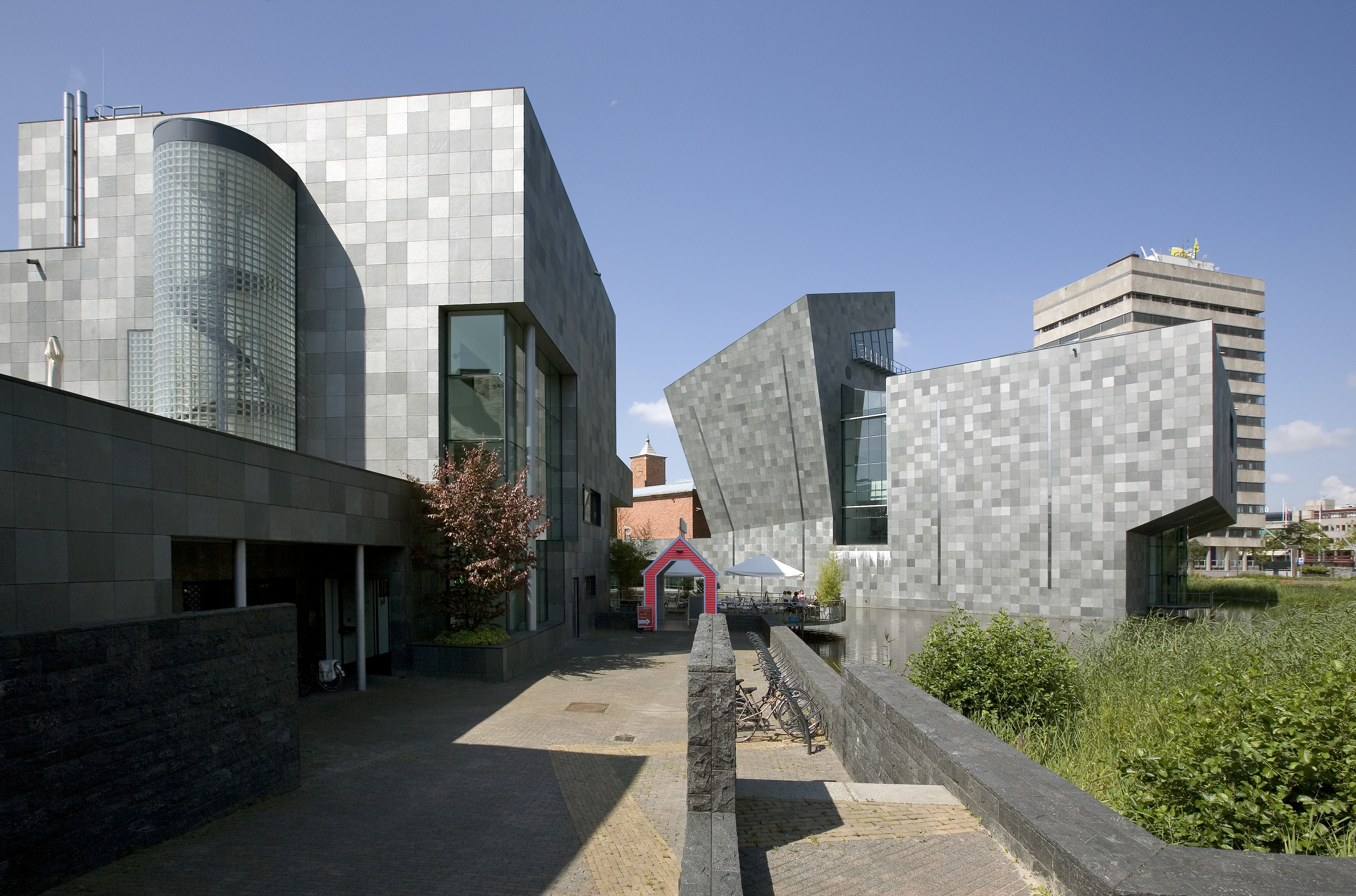
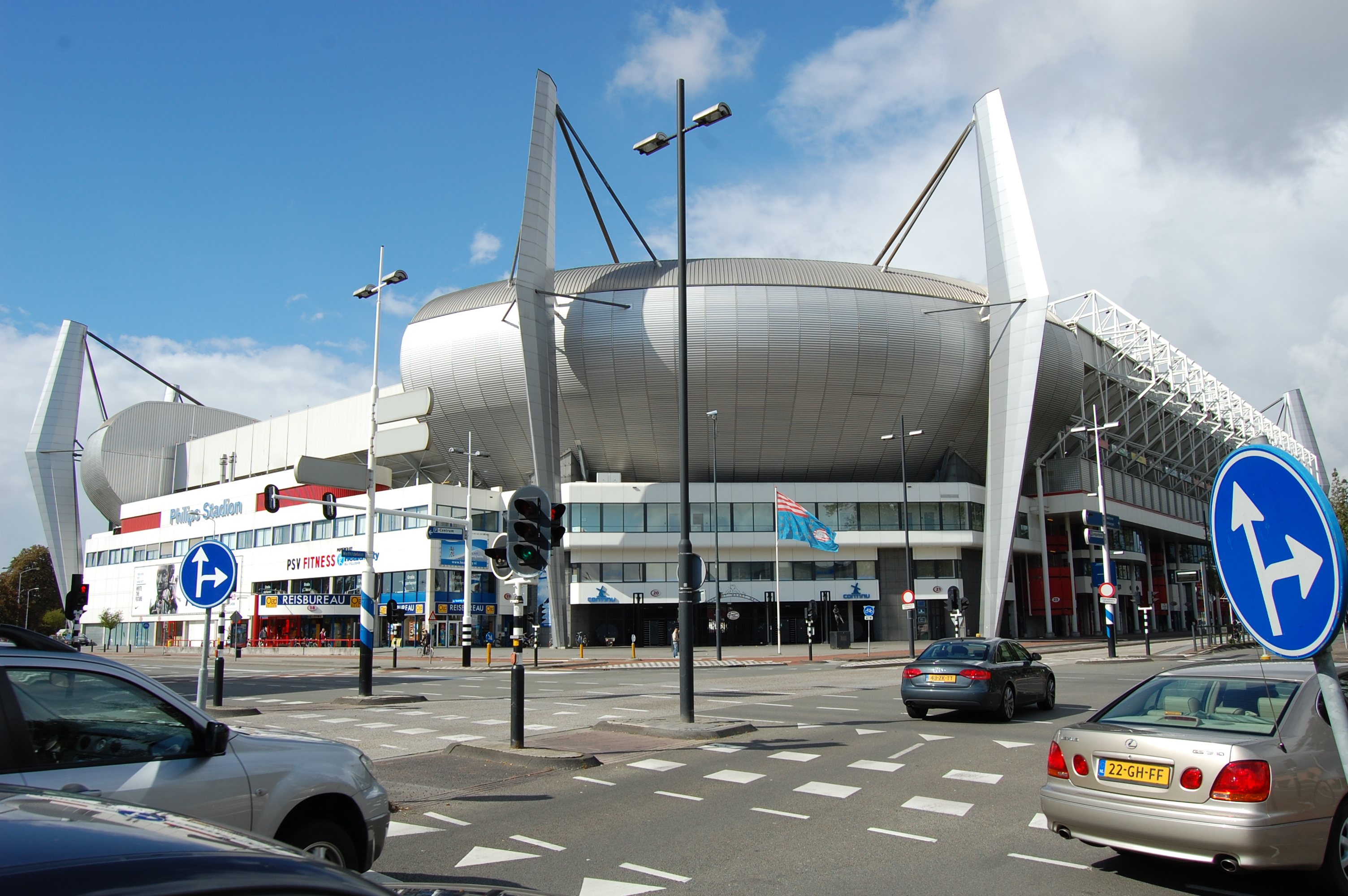
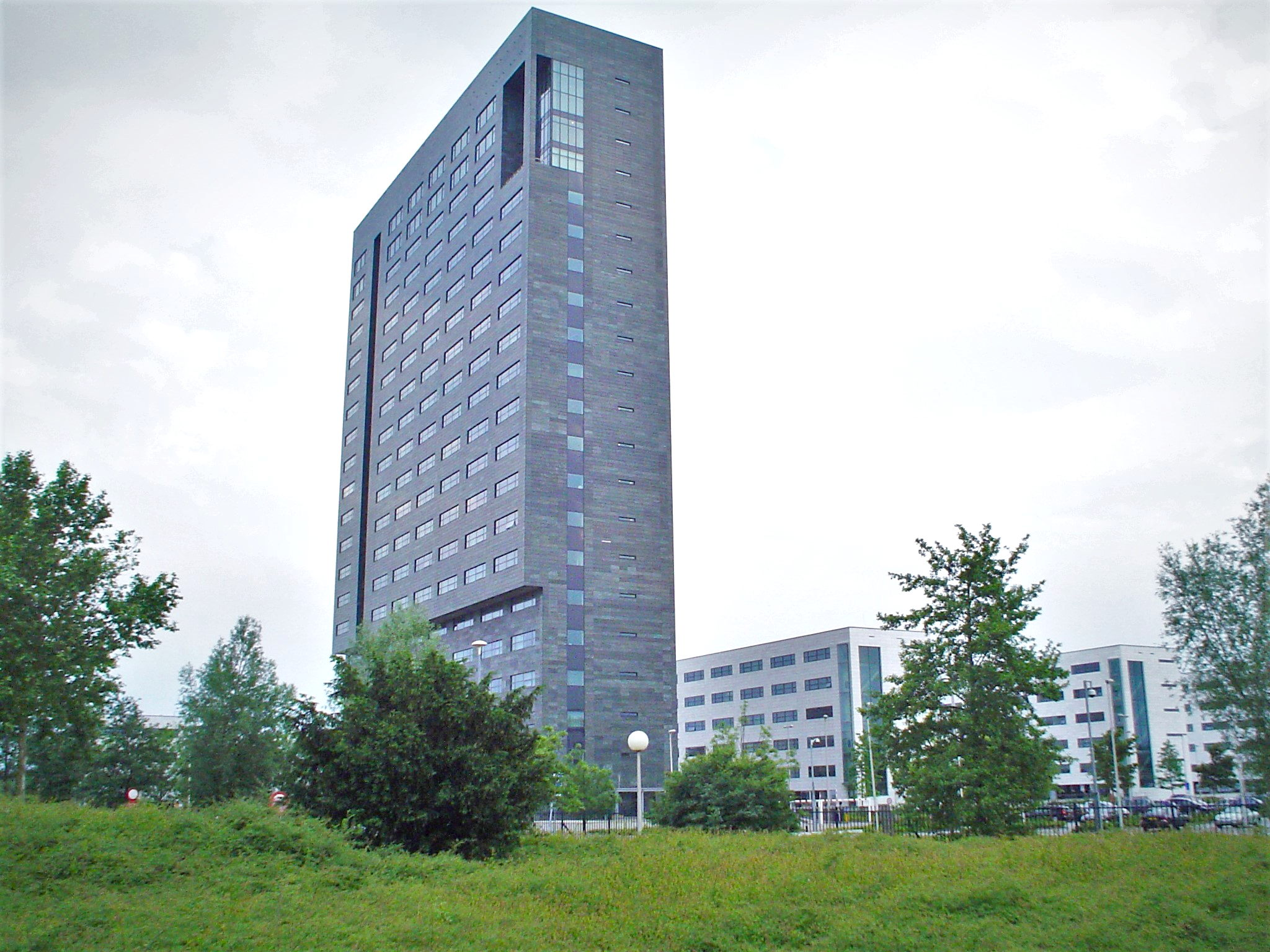
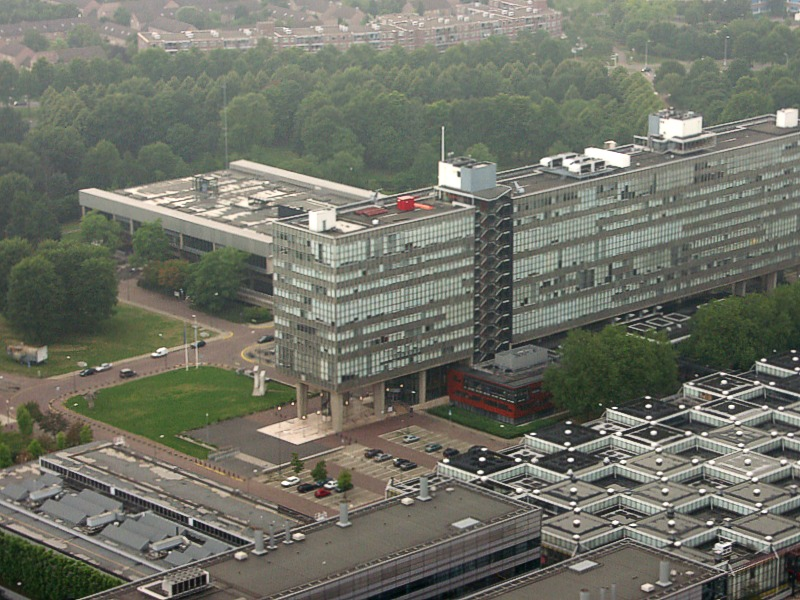
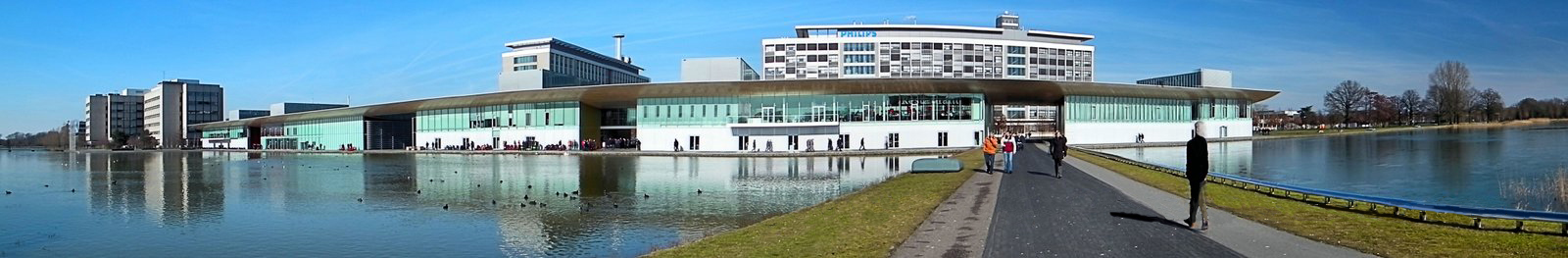
- From top down, left to right: Skyline of Eindhoven, Light Tower at the city centre, Evoluon conference centre, Philips Clock Building at Strijp-S, Eindhoven Airport, Van Abbe Museum, Philips Stadium of PSV Eindhoven, ASML headquarters, Eindhoven University of Technology, High Tech Campus Eindhoven

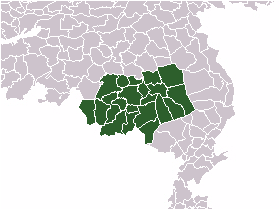
- Coordinates: 51°26′00″N 5°29′00″E
- Country: Netherlands
- Province: North Brabant
- Largest Cities: Eindhoven; Helmond
- Other Municipalities: List: Veldhoven; Geldrop-Mierlo; Deurne; Valkenswaard; Gemert-Bakel; Best; Nuenen; Laarbeek; Cranendonck; Bladel; Someren; Bergeijk; Eersel; Oirschot; Waalre; Asten; Son en Breugel; Heeze; Reusel-De Mierden

Area
  - Metro region: 1,457.81 km^{2} (562.86 sq mi)
  - Urban (Note: Stadsgewest Eindhoven 87,72km^{2} – Eindhoven 55,01km^{2} – Valkenswaard 34,31km^{2} – Best 33,72km^{2} – Nuenen 31,73km^{2} – Veldhoven 31,02km^{2} – Geldrop-Mierlo 25,95km^{2} – Son en Breugel 22,40km^{2} – Waalre +321,86 km^{2}): 321.86 km^{2} (124.27 sq mi)
  - Municipality: 88.87 km^{2} (34.31 sq mi)

Population (31 August 2015)
  - Metro region: 755,313
  - Density: 518.115/km^{2} (1,341.91/sq mi)
  - Urban: 422,666
  - Urban density: 1,313.2/km^{2} (3,401.2/sq mi)
  - Municipality: 224,300
  - Municipality density: 2,524/km^{2} (6,537/sq mi)

The Metropoolregio Eindhoven (MRE; English: Eindhoven Metropolitan Region), until 1 January 2014 the Samenwerkingsverband Regio Eindhoven (SRE; English: Cooperative union for the Region of Eindhoven), is a regional governmental agency for the city region of Eindhoven, Netherlands. The MRE comprises 21 municipalities in the Eindhoven agglomeration, with a total area of 1,457.81 square kilometres. The region has nearly three quarters of a million inhabitants and some 35,000 companies (employing over 330,000 people).

== Organizational structure ==
The MRE is a city region, which means that it is primarily a cooperation of municipalities (it also means that the MRE mandatorily carries out certain tasks for the municipalities, in the form of a joint administration). Final control over the MRE lies with the Regional Council (Dutch: Regioraad), which consists of representatives of the participating municipalities (either mayors or aldermen). The Council sets the general parameters and long-term guidelines within which the MRE operates. The Council also provides overview of the Daily Management, which is responsible for the daily running of the MRE.

The MRE is involved with many areas of administration that are cross-border concerns for the member municipalities. In order to facilitate this, the responsible aldermen for these areas meet six times a year in a meeting.

The Daily Management runs three separate services of the MRE:

- The MRE (the service which carries out the joint administration)
- The MRE Environmental Service, which assists the municipalities in environmental and regional planning
- The Regional Historic Center of Eindhoven

The Environmental Service is the largest of the MRE bodies.

In the area of administration, the MRE has three types of responsibilities:

- City region responsibilities. These are responsibilities that have been appointed to the MRE by mandate of being a city region (that is, the law delegates them to the MRE). Examples of these responsibilities are contracting public transportation and child care. Most of these responsibilities have been moved to the MRE from the province.
- Responsibilities as an extension to municipal administration. These are responsibilities that all member municipalities have delegated jointly to the MRE.
- Responsibilities that one or more member municipalities have unilaterally delegated to the MRE.

== Public transportation ==
The City and Regional Transportation in North Brabant is not entirely the legidomain of the province of North Brabant. Being a city region, MRE is the concession granter for public transportation in the southeast of the province. The current concession holder is Hermes. The MRE also commissioned the creation of the Phileas, a guided bus which runs on the rapid transit lines to Meerhoven, Eindhoven Airport and Veldhoven.

== Municipalities ==
Municipality	Population
Asten	16817
Bergeijk	18754
Best	30216
Bladel	20529
Cranendonck	21001
Deurne	32437
Eersel	19528
Eindhoven	235691
Geldrop-Mierlo	40066
Gemert-Bakel	30760
Heeze-Leende	16243
Helmond	92627
Laarbeek	22805
Nuenen	23702
Oirschot	18842
Reusel-De Mierden	13127
Someren	19428
Son en Breugel	17552
Valkenswaard	31221
Veldhoven	45500
Waalre	17544
Total	749,841

== See also ==
- Brabantse Stedenrij
- Uden-Veghel
