= Chișinău Botanical Garden of the Academy of Sciences =

Coordinates: 46°58′33″N 28°53′00″E

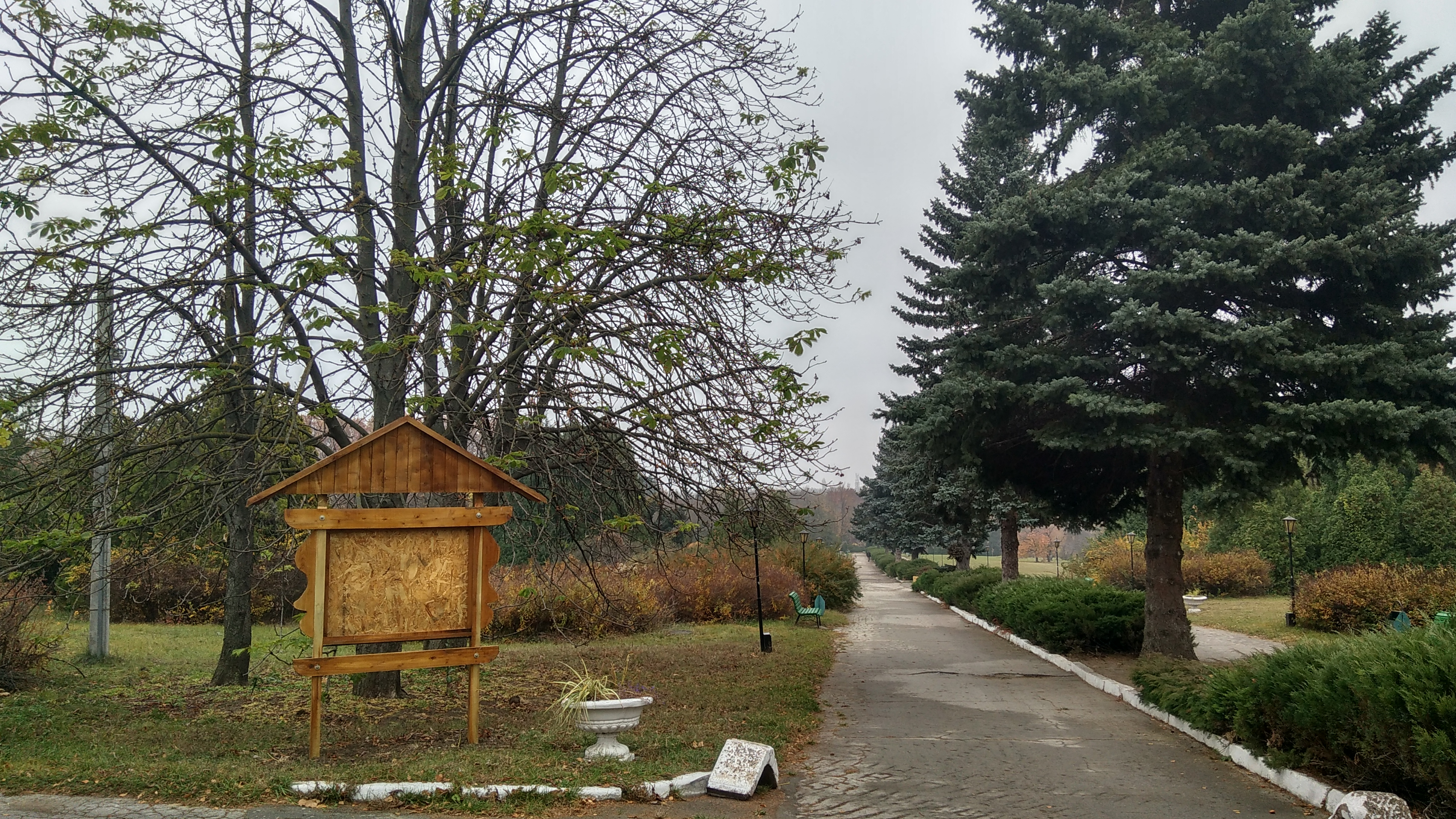
Main alley

The Chișinău Botanical Garden of the Academy of Sciences of Moldova (Romanian: Grădina botanică din Chișinău a Academiei de Științe a Moldovei) is a botanical research institution and public garden located in the Botanica sector of Chișinău, Moldova. Founded in 1950 by the Russian Academy of Science, the garden was initially established near the Durlești river valley before relocating to its current 104-hectare site in southwestern Chișinău in 1965. Under the directorship of Alexandru Ciubotaru from 1964, the garden was developed with comprehensive planning from 1966 to 1971, featuring specialized zones including a dendrarium, rose garden, rock garden, and decorative lakes for aquatic plants. The institution gained research institute status in 1975 as part of the Academy of Sciences of Moldovan SSR and has made significant contributions to botanical science in Moldova through plant conservation, scientific publications, and the establishment of specialized scientific schools, while also helping design numerous parks throughout Moldova before opening to the public in 2001.

== History ==
The botanical institution was initially established as a Botanical Sector that was later transformed into a Botanical Garden. The official decree for its organization came on 18 September 1950, through Directive No. 9477-T of the Council of Ministers of the USSR, which was implemented by a decision of the Moldavian SSR government signed by President Gherasim Rudi and Secretary Duca Diacenco.

The original site allocated for the garden consisted of 74 hectares in the Durlești river valley, where dendrology exhibitions were planned between 1951–1954. However, this location faced complications after the construction of the Komsomol Lake upstream, creating unfavourable conditions for the garden's development.

In 1964, Dr. Alexandru Ciubotaru was appointed as the new director of the Botanical Garden. Under his leadership, efforts were made to secure a new location in the southwestern part of Chișinău. In 1965–1966, design work began for both capital construction and landscaping at the current site of the Botanical Garden.

In 1973, a new botanical garden was established in the Botanica sector of Chișinău. Two years later, the garden was given the status of a Research Institute of the Academy of Sciences of Moldovan SSR.

== Scientific activities ==
The Botanical Garden has played an important role in the development of botanical science in Moldova. It has contributed to:

- Training national botanical scientists, with over 120 doctoral and 30 post-doctoral degrees awarded to specialists who conducted research at the garden
- Creating a comprehensive gene pool of plant diversity
- Initiating scientific publications and monographs, including fundamental works like "Определитель высших растений Молдавской ССР" (Identification Guide to Higher Plants of the Moldavian SSR), "Растительный мир Молдавии" (Plant World of Moldova), and "Flora Basarabiei"
- Establishing specialized scientific schools in geobotany, floristics, plant hybridization, plant anatomy, cytoembryology, paleobotany, and phycology

The garden was officially opened for public visitation in 2001, after nearly 30 years of development and construction.

== Development of current site ==
On 27 September 1965, Decision No. 919 of the Government of the Republic of Moldova allocated 104 hectares of land in the southwestern part of Chișinău to create a new botanical garden. This location was carefully selected to ensure diverse environmental conditions, including hills, slopes facing various directions, diverse soil types, and access to flowing water. These conditions were considered essential for cultivating a wide variety of native and introduced plant species.

Between 1966 and 1971, comprehensive plans were developed by a design institute based in Leningrad (now Saint Petersburg). The master plan for the garden was formally approved during the All-Union Session of Botanical Gardens held in Chișinău in September 1971. Construction of the garden began in the spring of 1972.

The garden's layout was structured into clearly defined zones. The primary exhibition zone included distinct sections such as a dendrarium, a rose garden (rosary), a lianrium (garden dedicated to climbing plants), a Japanese-style rock garden (rokarium), a lilac garden (syringarium), and an alpine garden (alpinarium). Central to the garden's design was a series of decorative lakes showcasing aquatic plants and an area dedicated to East Asian flora. Other planned facilities included a central greenhouse for tropical and subtropical plants, a laboratory building, educational areas, scientific research zones, and supporting infrastructure such as an extensive underground irrigation system, scientific library, herbarium, and botanical museum.

== Concerns ==
In 2001, a large portion of the botanical garden was leased to private companies, including Elat, which established a series of restaurants, playgrounds, ice cream parlors, and a zoo. The popularity of the botanical garden surged; thousands of visitors came, and between 300 and 400 cars entered the garden daily. The administration also reported up to 30–40 weddings per weekend.

These activities were brought to the attention of several ecological organizations in Moldova. Alexandru Ciubotaru, the director of the Botanical Garden, explained that the Academy of Science of Moldova allowed the commercialization of the garden because they were, at the time, under-budgeted by the Moldovan Government. "We only receive 800,000 lei a year and the heating alone costs 1.2 million lei," he said.

In 2005, the botanical garden received 700,000 lei from the Moldovan Ministry of Finance, allowing it to install a new German boiler system, significantly reducing annual heating costs from about 1.2 million lei to about 280,000 lei. The director said that the garden would slowly solve most of its problems independently, refusing to renew the lease with Elat, which expired on 7 July 2005.

== Green space development ==
Beyond its primary scientific functions, the Botanical Garden has contributed to the design and creation of numerous parks and green spaces throughout Chișinău and Moldova. Notable projects include the Cap de Pod Șerpeni Memorial Park, the memorial park at the German soldiers' cemetery (1944), the monastic dendrological park at Curchi Monastery, and extensive landscaping work on the arboretum (172 hectares) located on the right side when exiting the city toward the airport.
