= City region =

City region is a term used by urbanists, economists and urban planners to refer to how one or more core cities are linked to a hinterland by functional ties, such as economic, housing-market, commuting, marketing or retail catchment factors. This concept emphasizes the importance of these functional relationships in understanding urban areas and their surrounding regions, often providing more insightful perspectives than the arbitrary boundaries assigned to administrative bodies.

== Global perspective ==
Using Geographic information system (GIS) technology, city-regions have been mapped globally, revealing significant interconnectedness among urban centers and their surrounding areas. The Nature Cities article “Worldwide Delineation of Multi-Tier City–Regions” classified over 30,000 urban centers into four tiers—town, small, intermediate, and large city—based on population size and mapped their catchment areas based on travel time rather than administrative boundaries. Travel time is used to reflect daily commuting patterns within a 1-hour limit and less frequent activities up to a 3-hour limit. This publicly available dataset shows that 3.2 billion people have physical access to multiple tiers within an hour, and 4.7 billion within three hours. It also distinguishes between primary and secondary city-regions; in secondary ones, catchment areas of urban centers overlap with those of larger centers. This approach highlights how people rely on multiple urban centers for different needs, with larger centers offering a wider range of activities. For example, a person might shop in a nearby town, work in an intermediate city, and use an airport in a large city, thus belonging to the catchment areas of several urban centers.

== Tools ==
=== City-Region Explorer ===
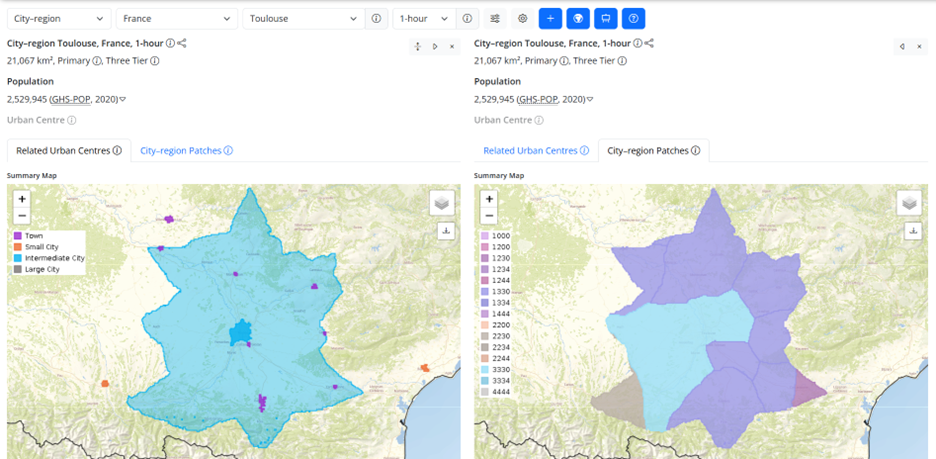
One-hour travel time city-region of Toulouse, generated on the City-Region Explorer: the urban center (dark blue), surrounding region (light blue), towns (purple), and small cities (orange). Right panel shows accessibility-based patches defined by urban center combinations.

To empower stakeholders with insights on city-regions around the world, the publicly available City-Region Explorer platform provides an online mapping and data analytics application that offers intuitive access and robust analysis tools. Based on the multi-tier city–region (MTCR) framework and integrated into the FAO Agro-Informatics Platform, the tool visualizes each city-region as an ensemble of "patches" — unique spatial units defined by and associated with access to a specific combination of urban centers within given travel times. It also provides information about populations’ access to different types of urban centers for the year 2020, allowing the comparison across existing gridded population datasets. When combined with geospatial and socioeconomic datasets, the City-Region Explorer helps identify underserved areas, guide infrastructure investments, and support inclusive development strategies across sectors such as agriculture, connectivity, education, and resource management, advancing evidence-based planning aligned with the Sustainable Development Goals.

=== Functional urban areas ===
A related concept to city-regions or metropolitan areas is Functional Urban Areas (FUA), which link high-density urban centres with at least 50 thousand people plus their surrounding commuting zones. The Global Human Settlement – Functional Urban Areas (GHS-FUA) dataset, developed by the European Commission’s Joint Research Centre (JRC), delineates FUAs based on population distribution and commuting patterns for the reference year of 2015. The web-platform OECD Regions and Cities Data Visualisation is a tool for visualizing the FUAs and their populations.

=== Market Saturation & Utilization Core-Based Statistical Areas Mapping Tool ===
In the United States, the concept of city regions is reflected in the classification of Core-Based Statistical Areas (CBSAs), defined by the Office of Management and Budget (OMB). CBSAs encompass Metropolitan and Micropolitan Statistical Areas and are designed to capture economic and social integration between an urban core and surrounding counties, primarily through commuting patterns. A Metropolitan Statistical Area (MSA) includes at least one urbanized area with a population of 50,000 or more, approximating the idea of a one-hour city region and illustrating the functional reach of major urban centers.

To support analysis and planning, several interactive resources provide access to CBSA boundaries and related data. The U.S. Census Bureau publishes official delineation files and reference maps that define CBSAs, metropolitan divisions, and combined statistical areas, which can be downloaded or viewed online. For more dynamic exploration, ArcGIS Online hosts interactive feature layers and web maps based on TIGER/Line shapefiles, allowing users to visualize CBSA boundaries, filter by metropolitan or micropolitan status, and integrate these layers into custom dashboards. Specialized tools also exist for sector-specific applications: the CMS Market Saturation and Utilization Tool offers CBSA-level maps for health service utilization and provider density, while the GSA CBSA Lookup Tool enables map-based navigation of awarded services and vendors by CBSA.

== United Kingdom ==
In the United Kingdom, the city regional agenda began to be seen as an alternative to the regional assemblies in England that were favoured as a partial answer to the West Lothian question but rejected in a referendum by voters in North East England in November 2004. The concept of city regions and their development features heavily in The Northern Way, a collaborative development plan between the three northernmost English regional development agencies. An embryonic city regional framework exists in the form of the Passenger Transport Executive and the Core Cities Group. The October 2006 Local Government White Paper did not contain firm proposals for city-region-wide authorities however.

The New Local Government Network proposed the creation of city regions as part of on-going reform efforts, while a report released by the IPPR's Centre for Cities proposed the creation of four large city-regions based on Birmingham, Leeds, Liverpool and Greater Manchester. The strong economy of Edinburgh and its hinterland (Forth Valley, Fife, West Lothian, Midlothian and East Lothian) means it has been named as one of Europe's fasting growing city-regions.

Also in 2006, the OECD published a number of studies on city regions, including an assessment profile of the Newcastle-Gateshead city region and a review of numerous city regions across the world.

In July 2007, HM Treasury published its Review of sub-national economic development and regeneration, which stated that the government would allow those city regions that wished to work together to form a statutory framework for city regional activity, including powers over transport, skills, planning and economic development. Under the government's Transport Innovation Fund, city regions can band together to pilot forms of road pricing, such as the Greater Manchester congestion charge considered by councils in Greater Manchester (but later rejected by referendum). In the April 2009 Budget, the government announced that Greater Manchester and Leeds would be the first two city regions with formal powers. While this was later discontinued as a result of the May 2010 general election, the Conservative–Liberal Democrat coalition government did agree to the creation of the Greater Manchester Combined Authority in 2011, with all other proposals and the regional development agencies being subsumed into the local enterprise partnerships.

== France ==
Since January 2010 municipalities, departments and cities can combine into a larger body known as a Metropole. The first Metropole in France, Nice-Cote-d'Azur was created in 2011. In 2014 the government of Jean-Marc Ayrault passed a bill that moved away from the voluntary nature and made it mandatory for all Metropolitan areas of over 600,000 inhabitants to become Metropoles as of January 1, 2015. The first 3 mandatory Metropoles are;

- Greater Paris
- Aix-Marseille-Provence
- Lyon

Metropoles take over certain determined responsibilities from the State, other sub-national bodies or quasi-public bodies. Once devolved to the Metropole these responsibilities are the sole responsibility of the Metropole. In addition to assuming responsibility for certain policy Metropoles also take over responsibility for tax collection.

== Poland ==
- Metropolis GZM

== Spain ==
- Community of Madrid

== Thailand ==
- Bangkok Metropolitan Region

== Italy ==
Metropolitan cities of Italy, previously Provinces of Italy, including Metropolitan City of Rome

== Netherlands ==
A plusregio (also called stadsregio) is a regional public body of several Dutch municipalities in an urban area which statutory tasks are assigned under Chapter XI of the "Wet gemeenschappelijke regelingen".

== Afghanistan ==
Five major city regions have been identified in Afghanistan based on functional relationships. These center around Kabul and the four regional hub cities of Herat, Kandahar, Mazari-i-Sharif and Jalalabad. It is estimated that the five city regions comprise approximately one third of the total Afghan population.

== Bibliography ==
- Allen J. Scott (ed.) (2001) Global City-Regions: Trends, Theory Policy, Oxford: Oxford University Press.

== See also ==
- Catchment area
- Functional urban area
- Metropolitan area
- Regional planning
- Rural development
- Urban planning
