= Trolleybuses in La Spezia =

Public transit network in Liguria, Italy

La Spezia trolleybus system
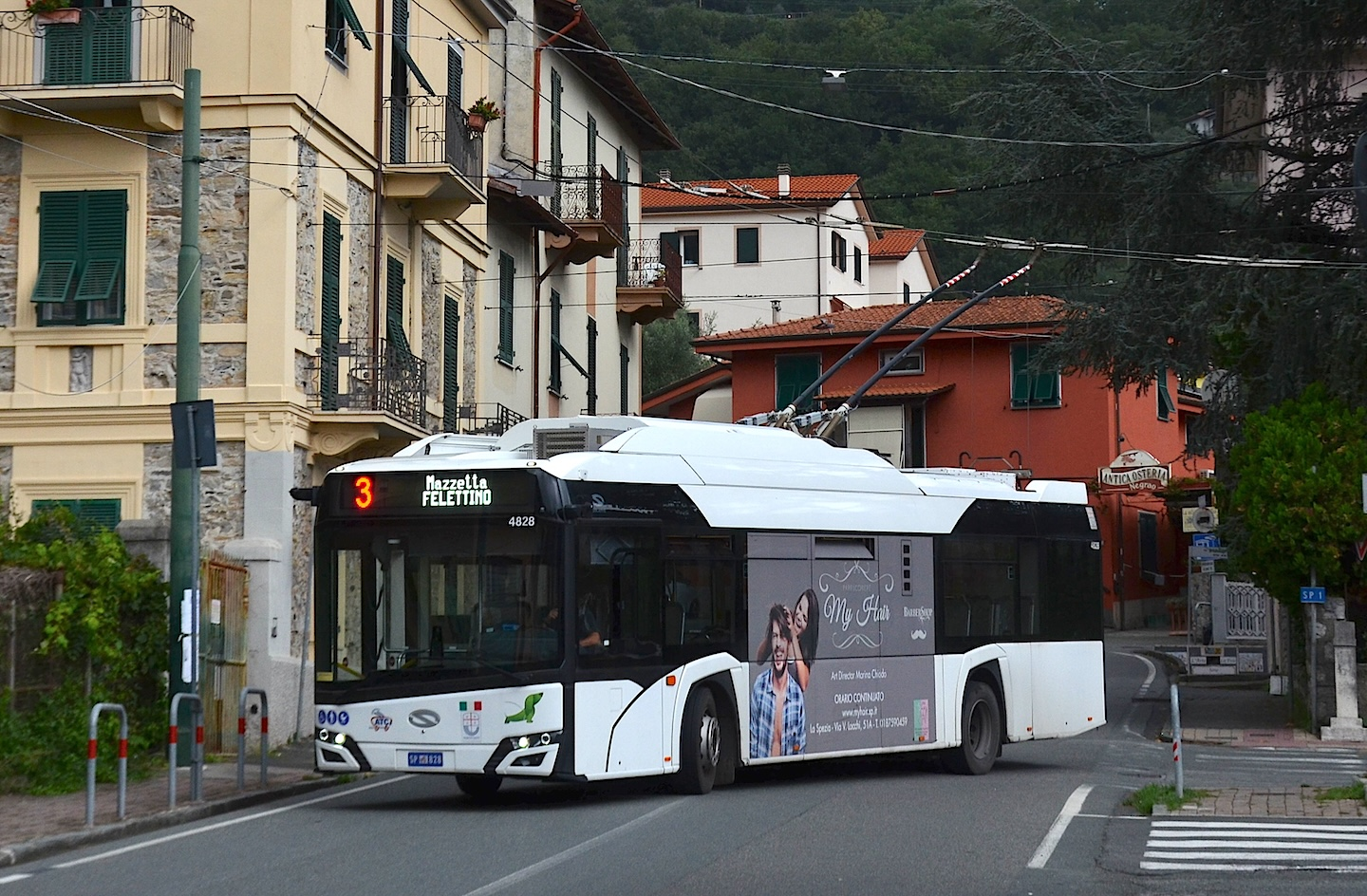
- Solaris trolleybus no. 4828 departing Chiappa terminus in 2024

Operation
- Locale: La Spezia, Liguria, Italy

Statistics
Experimental era: 1906–1909
- Status: Closed
- Routes: 1
Current era: since 1951
- Status: Open
- Routes: 3
- Operator: ATC
- Stock: 27 trolleybuses
- Route length: 24.8 km (15.4 mi)
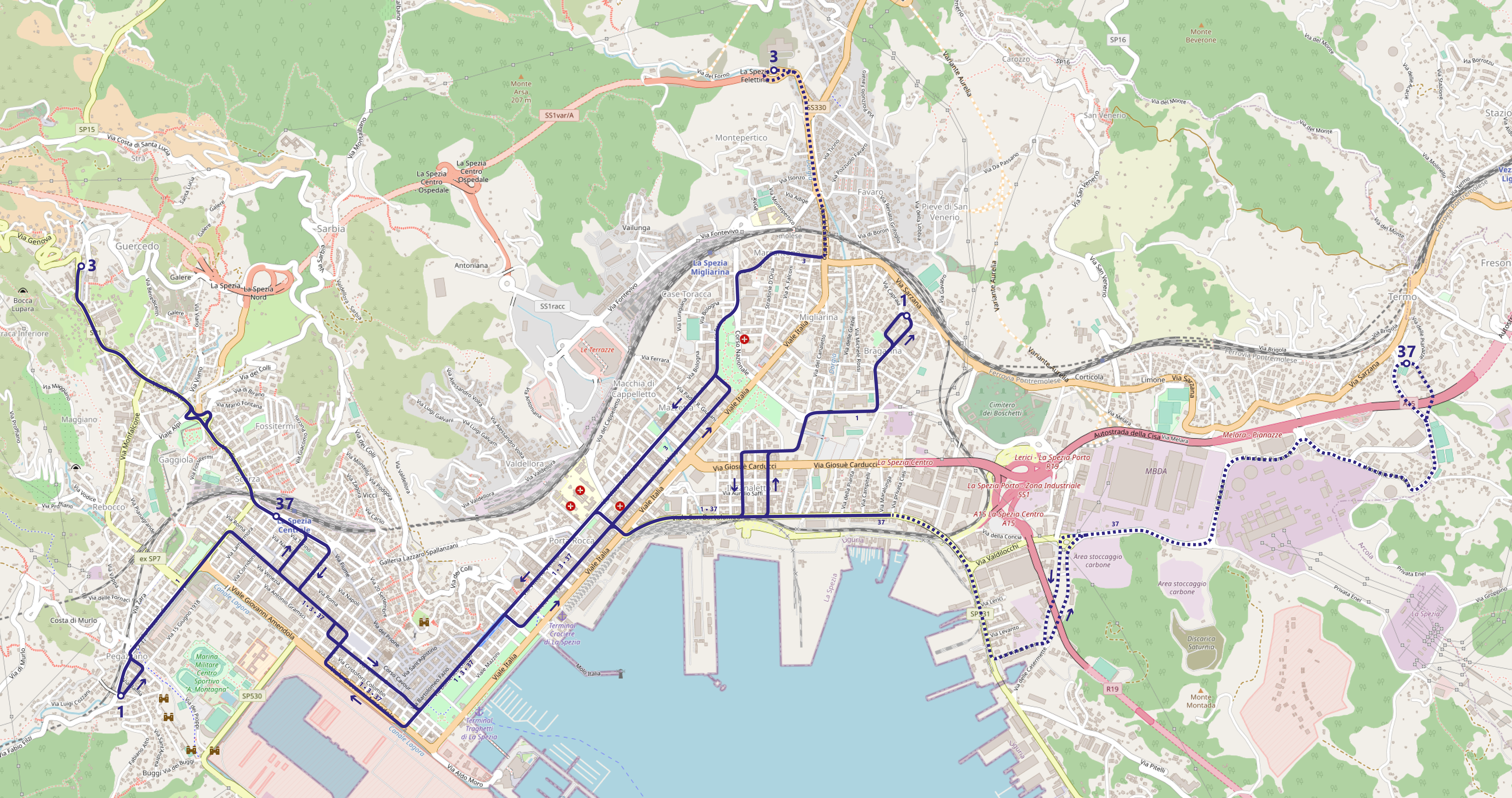
- Website: ATC La Spezia (in Italian)

The La Spezia trolleybus system (Italian: Rete filoviaria della Spezia) forms part of the public transport network of the city and comune of La Spezia, in the region of Liguria, northwest Italy.

The current system is in operation since 1951; previously, at the start of the twentieth century, La Spezia was served by a pioneering experimental system.

== History ==
The first, pioneering, trolleybus service in La Spezia was active between 1906 and 1909, and ran from the city centre to Fezzano, on the road to Portovenere. It was an experimental line, one of the first to be built in Italy, and was served by Omnibus Turrinelli vehicles numbered from 31 to 34.

After World War II, trolleybuses returned to town in a more modern form, to replace the tram system that had become obsolete. La Spezia's first regular trolleybus line entered service in 1951. It was operated with Fiat 668 model trolleybuses bodied by Viberti, and with electrical equipment by Ansaldo. Numbered 201 to 213, they were 10 m (33 ft) long, had a central driving position, and their maximum speed was 52 km/h (32 mph).

In 1953, another four trolleybuses of the same model were added to the fleet. They were numbered from 214 to 217. In the same year, nine Alfa Romeo 900 AF vehicles, bodied by Piaggio and with Ansaldo electrical equipment, came into circulation in La Spezia. Their fleet numbers were 218 to 226.

In 1954, the then operator of the system, FITRAM, ordered two more trolleybuses, nos 227 and 228, with electrical equipment by Maschine Works Oerlikon from the San Giorgio company in Pistoia. With a length of 11 meters, and a greater availability of seats (over 28), they were the first trolleybuses in La Spezia to have battery powered autonomous auxiliary equipment located in the underbody, but they were never used on regular shifts. Due to their unsatisfactory cab layout and steering, and low-capacity braking, they were sold during 1959.

Three years earlier, in 1956, Alfa Romeo 910 AF trolleybuses nos 229 and 230 had enriched the trolley fleet, and their use on line 2 until 1978 testifies to their hard work. They were bodied by Officine Meccaniche Pistoiesi, and, as usual, electrical equipment was by Ansaldo.

In 1963, SEAC of Carmagnola created nine Alfa Romeo 1000 AF trolleybuses for La Spezia. With Ansaldo electrical components and Tubocar bodies, they were numbered 231 to 240. The Alfa 1000 were still employed on fixed shifts of circular line 1/3 to the end of the 1970s.

In 1975, trolleybus no 203, with Mauri light aluminum alloy bodywork, was added to the fleet. This experiment was extended to the 668 Vibertis that had never received attention, nor revisions: nos 209 and 214. In 1977, four more vehicles, nos 241 to 244, were purchased from AMT in Genoa. Again, these were Fiat 668 Mauris. With the closure of line 2 in 1978, the Alfas nos 900 and 910, and the remaining 668 Vibertis, were scrapped. The trolleybuses still circulating were nos 203, 209, 214, and 231 to 244.

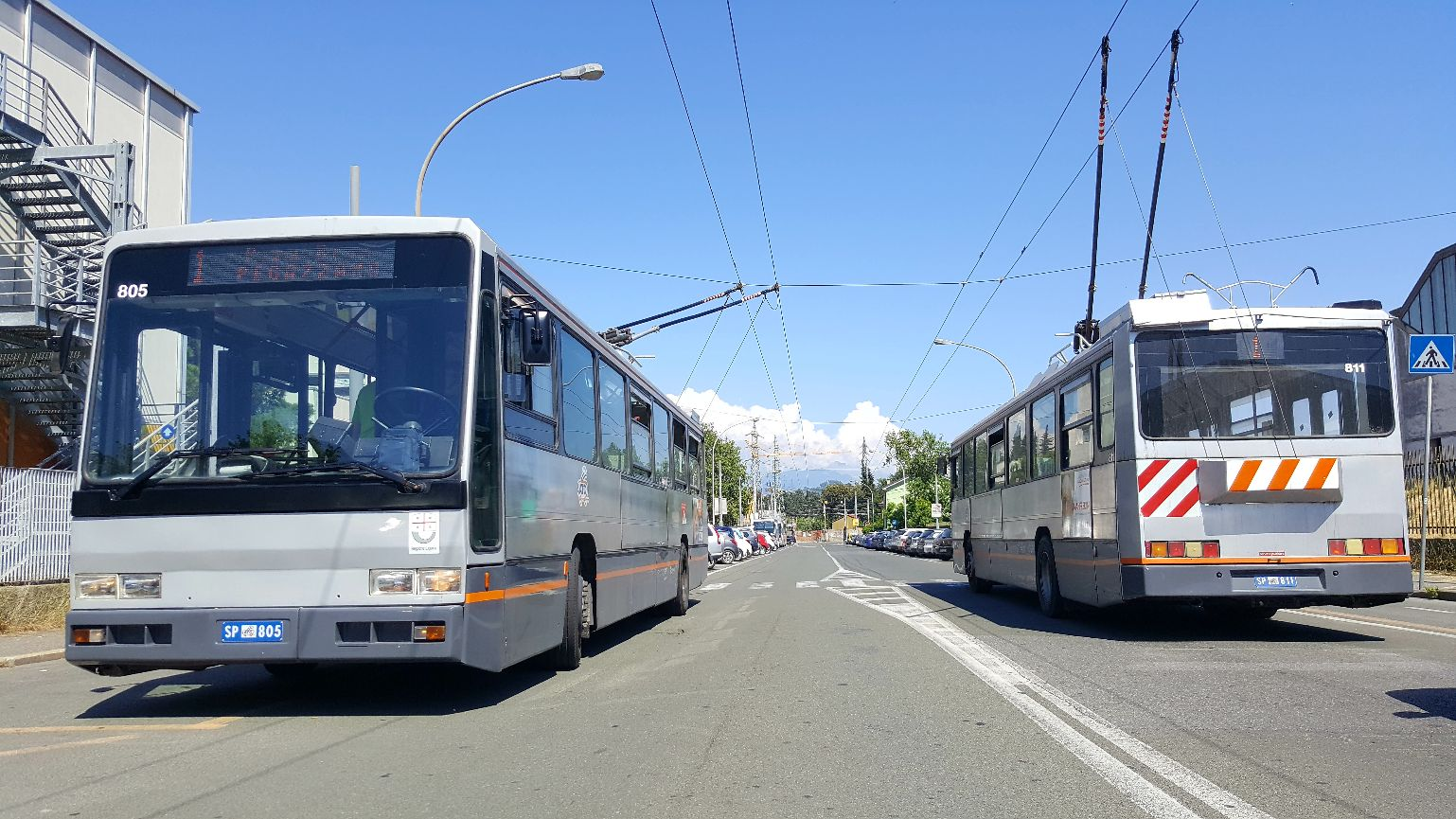
Breda trolleybuses nos. 805 and 811 passing

After a final period in which trolleybus operation was limited to the morning hours, trolleybus service was suspended altogether in June 1985, for asphalting work on Via Chiodo. It was restored three years later, on 26 November 1988, with the arrival of new Breda vehicles, numbered from 801 to 814, following the presentation, on 19 December 1987, of the prototype, no 800. The new vehicles, with their wide technological gap due to air conditioning in summer, space for the inclusion of an independent brand of auxiliary motor, and a capacity of 112 (20 seats, 91 standing and 1 driver), had a greatly positive impact: they are all still in service to this day.

In 1998, the network was reorganized, with the activation of the new trunk line Canaletto–Bragarina, and the separation of lines 1 and 3 after 30 years of operation as a circular line.

In 2005, due to work on line 3 in Corso Nazionale and near Piazzale Ferro, trolleybus services were suspended between Chiappa and Canaletto and replaced by buses on a single line 3 Chiappa–Felettino. Between 2005 and 2007, the trolleybuses were circulating at a record low: only three daily on line 1 Pegazzano–Bragarina at a frequency of one every 20 minutes.

On 30 March 2007, the inaugural run of line 1 took place to the new terminus at Palaspezia. From 12 May 2007 to 11 September 2008, trolleybuses operated alternatively either to the terminus at Bragarina, or to the new one at Palaspezia at a frequency of one every 10 minutes. From 12 September 2008 to 31 March 2011, line 1 effectively operated only between Pegazzano and Bragarina, at 12-minute intervals with six cars on the road. From 1 April 2011, with the introduction of the new timetable, trolleybuses are circulating once again three at a time, every 20 minutes, as in 2006. On 9 June 2012 the service was fully suspended for two years, with the consequent provision of Bredabus 4001.12, in service since 1988. Service was re-opened on 20 March 2014.

== Services ==
In the years since its establishment, the current system has had two or three lines. The present three are:

- 1 - Pegazzano – Via Chiodo – Canaletto – Bragarina
- 3 - Chiappa – Via Chiodo – Felettino Hospital
- 37 - Pianazze – Fossamastra – Via Fiume

Former line:

- 2 - Closed in 1978, upon the integration of long-distance buses to Lerici and Portovenere into the urban service

== Fleet ==
=== Past fleet ===
The following trolleybuses were used on the existing La Spezia trolleybus system in the past:

- 13 Fiat 668F / Viberti; built 1951, nos. 201-213. Nos. 203 and 209 were rebodied by Mauri in 1975.
- 4 Fiat 668F / Viberti; built 1953, nos. 214-217. No. 214 was rebodied by Mauri in 1977.
- 9 Alfa Romeo 900AF; built 1953, nos. 218–226.
- 2 San Giorgio 012; built 1954, nos. 227–228.
- 2 Alfa Romeo 910AF; built 1956, nos. 229–230.
- 10 Alfa Romeo 1000AF; built 1963, nos. 231–240.
- 4 Fiat 668F / Mauri; built 1950, nos. 241-244. Acquired secondhand from the Genoa trolleybus system in 1974; all four rebodied by Mauri in 1977.
- 14 Breda 4001.12; built 1988, nos. 801–814. Last units retired in April 2023.

=== Current fleet ===
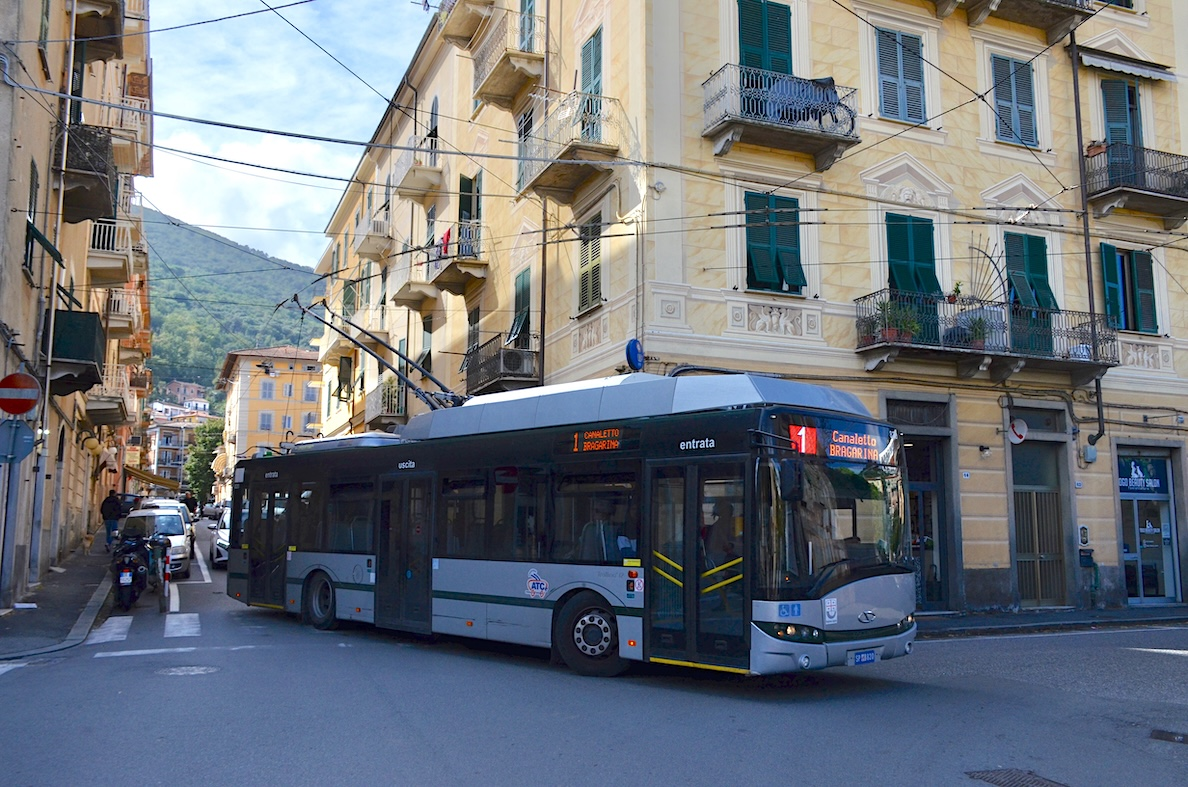
2013-built Solaris trolleybus no. 820 in Pegazzano in 2024

La Spezia's current trolleybus fleet is as follows:

- 8 Solaris Trollino III 12; built 2013, nos. 815–822. Delivered starting in September 2013, and entered service in March 2014.
- 14 Solaris Trollino IV 12; built 2022, nos. 4823–4836. Entered service in April 2023.
- 5 Solaris Trollino IV 18 articulated; built 2022, nos. 4850–4854. First unit was delivered in 2022, and at least one more arrived later the same year, but none have entered service yet (as of 2024).

== See also ==
- La Spezia Centrale railway station
- List of trolleybus systems in Italy
