= Trolleybuses in Pescara =

Electric transit system serving Pescara, Italy

Pescara trolleybus system
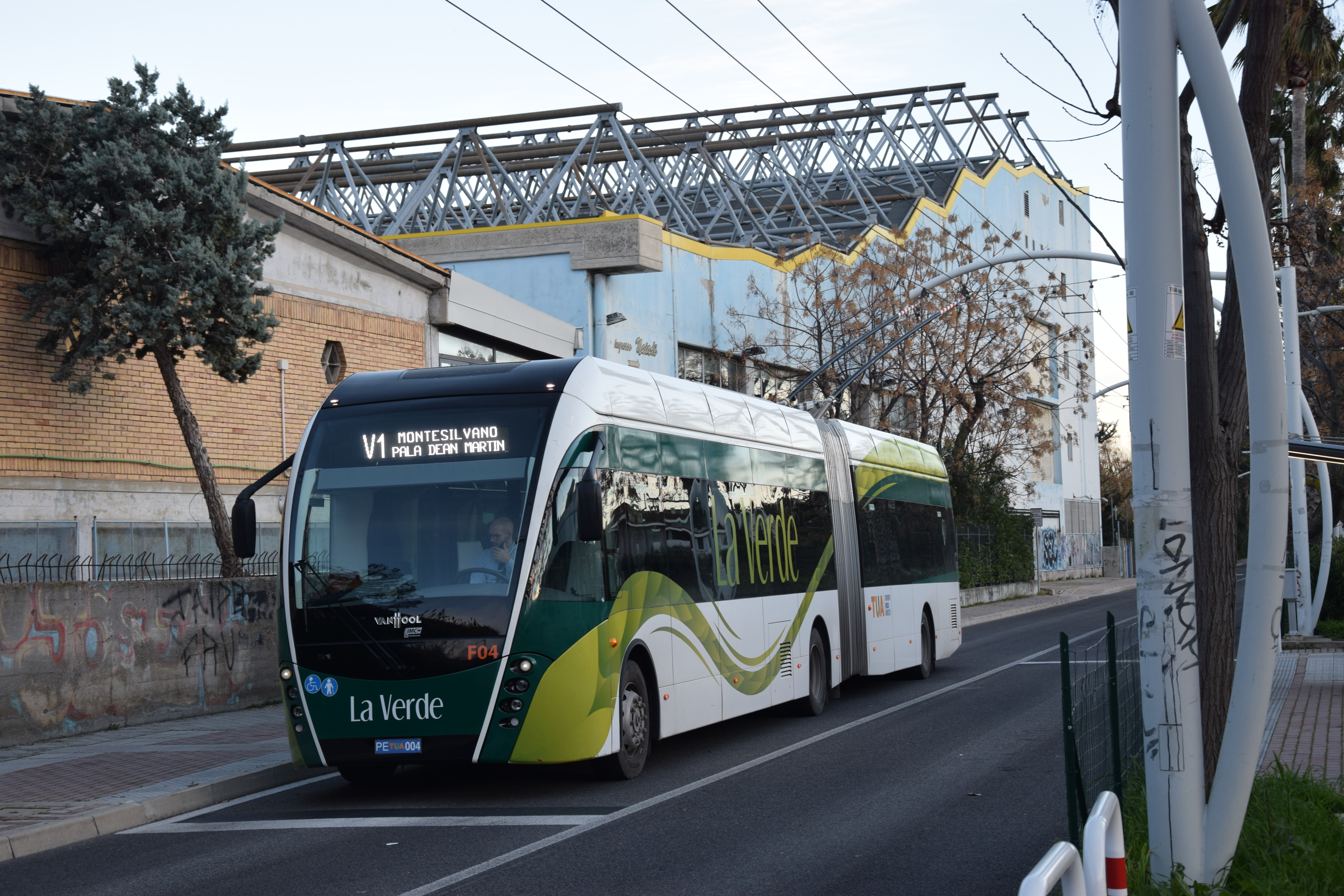
- One of Pescara's Van Hool Exqui.City trolleybuses

Operation
- Locale: Pescara, Italy

Statistics
Experimental era: 1903–1904
- Status: Closed
- Routes: 1
- Electrification: Cantono-Frigerio system, 250 Volts DC
- Route length: 1.4 km (0.87 mi)
Current era: Since 2025
- Status: Open
- Routes: 1
- Operator: TUA (Trasporto Unico Abruzzese)
- Electrification: 750 V DC
- Route length: Approx. 8 kilometres (5.0 mi)
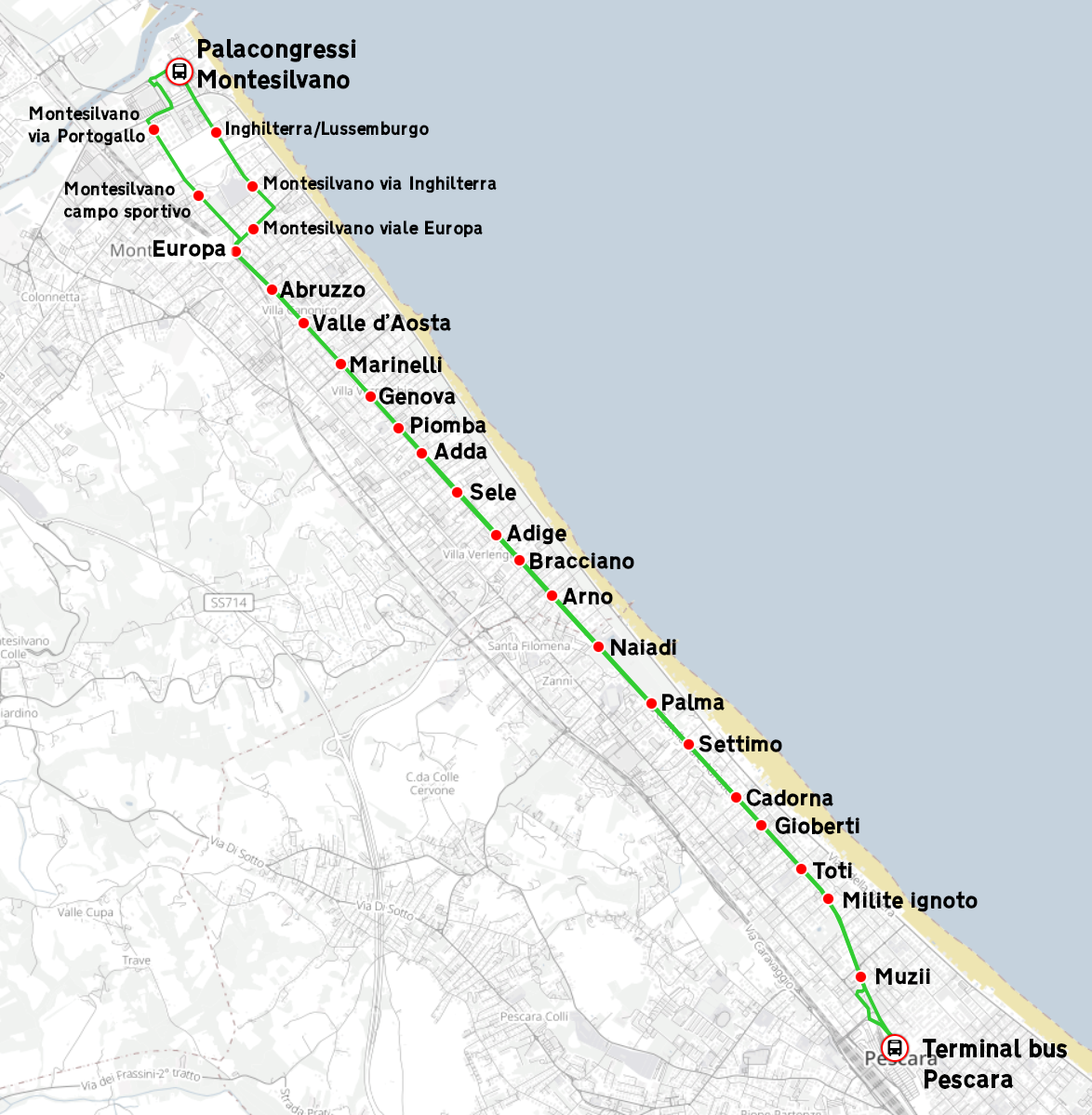

The Pescara trolleybus system (Italian: Filovia di Pescara) forms part of the public transport network of the city of Pescara and the province of Pescara, in the region of Abruzzo in Italy. The current trolleybus route connects Pescara with the suburb of Montesilvano and is a bus rapid transit route that runs for most of its length in a busway constructed in a former railway right-of-way. Trolleybuses originally served the city on a short route that lasted only from 1903 to 1904, and was the first trolleybus line in Italy. The route connected Pescara with Castellamare, a part of the city that was a separate municipality at that time.

Planning for a new trolleybus system began in the early 1990s, when a busway route served by trolleybuses rose to the top of a list of ideas discussed for new use of a railway right-of-way closed in 1988, to encourage use of public transport. Plans settled on an 8-kilometre-long (5.0 mi) route connecting Pescara with Montesilvano, running mostly along the former railway alignment. In 1998, the right-of-way was paved and made temporarily into a bike path and footpath, officially named Via Castellamare Adriatico but more commonly known as "Strada Parco" (Park Road). Funding was secured by 2003, but the project was repeatedly delayed by an activist group that had formed to oppose conversion of the Strada Parco path into a public transport corridor. A construction contract was signed in 2007 and work began in 2009. The first of six trolleybuses ordered from a Dutch manufacturer, Advanced Public Transport Systems (APTS), was delivered in 2011, but APTS became insolvent in late 2014, before any more vehicles were delivered, causing more delays. By 2017, the line's infrastructure had largely been completed, and a trolleybus from the nearby Chieti trolleybus system was borrowed to carry out tests. A replacement vehicle order was finalised in early 2021, and the six vehicles were delivered in 2022.

In early 2025, the six Van Hool trolleybuses had yet to be given their required certification testing by the national regulatory agency ANSFISA, so it was decided to introduce service temporarily using battery buses, on what was now designated route V1, "La Verde" (the green one). This initial service began on 28 April 2025, but lasted only one month, because the group opposing the conversion of the former railway right-of-way to public transport use was continuing to fight the project, and secured a temporary court order halting the battery-bus service, with effect from 28 May 2025. That restriction was eventually lifted, and the final round of test runs with trolleybuses began in August 2025. The new system opened as a trolleybus service on 11 September 2025.

== First system ==
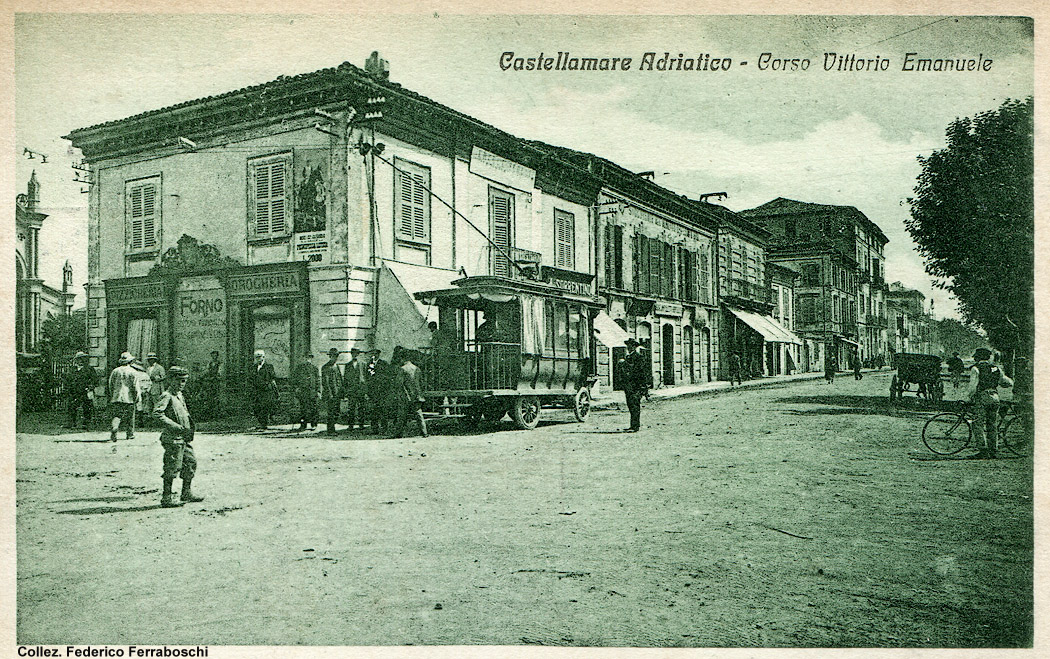
Postcard of the original trolleybus system

The first trolleybus line in all of Italy was a 1.4-kilometre-long (0.9 mi) route connecting Pescara with Castellamare Adriatico that opened on 15 June 1903. Like most other trolleybus systems of the early 20th century, it was short-lived, as trolleybus technology was still relatively new and experimental at that time. The Pescara system used the Cantono-Frigerio system of power supply and current collection. The fleet included three trolleybuses (another source says two), one of which was open-sided. Service ceased after about one year, in 1904.

== Second system ==
=== History ===
In 1988, the Adriatic railway was moved to a new alignment in Pescara, and the old right-of-way became disused. This consisted of 11.2 km of line, running northwestwards from the old Pescara railway station to just beyond the suburb of Montesilvano and southeastwards from Pescara to around 4.4 km north of Francavilla al Mare. Discussions of how to repurpose the disused right-of-way began, and a trolleybus line became one of the proposals in 1989. In 1992, following approval by the city council, the first funding request was submitted to the Regional Council of Abruzzo, for an initial route between Pescara and Montesilvano. In 1995, the council agreed to finance the project, which would create a public transport service in the right-of-way and also include a bikeway and pedestrian facilities. In 1996, the plans envisioned a 12.3-kilometre-long (7.6 mi) route from Pescara north to Montesilvano, and later a second route that would run for 5.5 km (3.4 mi) to the airport. In 1999, the various local governments involved expressed their support for the trolleybus project.

In 2001, the Italian Ministry of Infrastructure and Transport agreed to help finance the project, which had been refined to comprise a route connecting Pescara with Montesilvano and Silvi. Subject to funding, there would be additional routes running to Francavilla (9 km (5.6 mi)) and possibly one to Chieti, connecting with the existing trolleybus system there.

In 2003, the first funding for construction, €24 million, was allocated by the government. However, by this time, opposition to the plans had surfaced, in the form of a group that objected to the use of the former railway right-of-way for transport vehicles. The right-of-way had been temporarily converted into a bike and walking path, named "Strada Parco" (Park Road), and members of this group opposed the idea of ever introducing motorised vehicles there. This opposition would continue to delay the project, off and on, over a span of more than 20 years. The "Strada Parco 'Common Good' Committee" periodically won legal victories that delayed the work, but those decisions were subsequently overturned by later court rulings.

In July 2006, a contract was signed with Balfour Beatty for design and engineering work on the initial route, from Pescara to Montesilvano (8 km). A contract for construction was signed in May 2007. For the supply of the vehicles, Balfour Beatty subcontracted with the Dutch company Advanced Public Transport Systems (APTS), a joint venture of VDL Berkhof and other manufacturers, for six articulated trolleybuses of its Phileas design. Political factors continued to delay the project, but construction finally began in spring 2009, in Montesilvano. The project was given the name Filò (short for filobus, the Italian term for trolleybus).

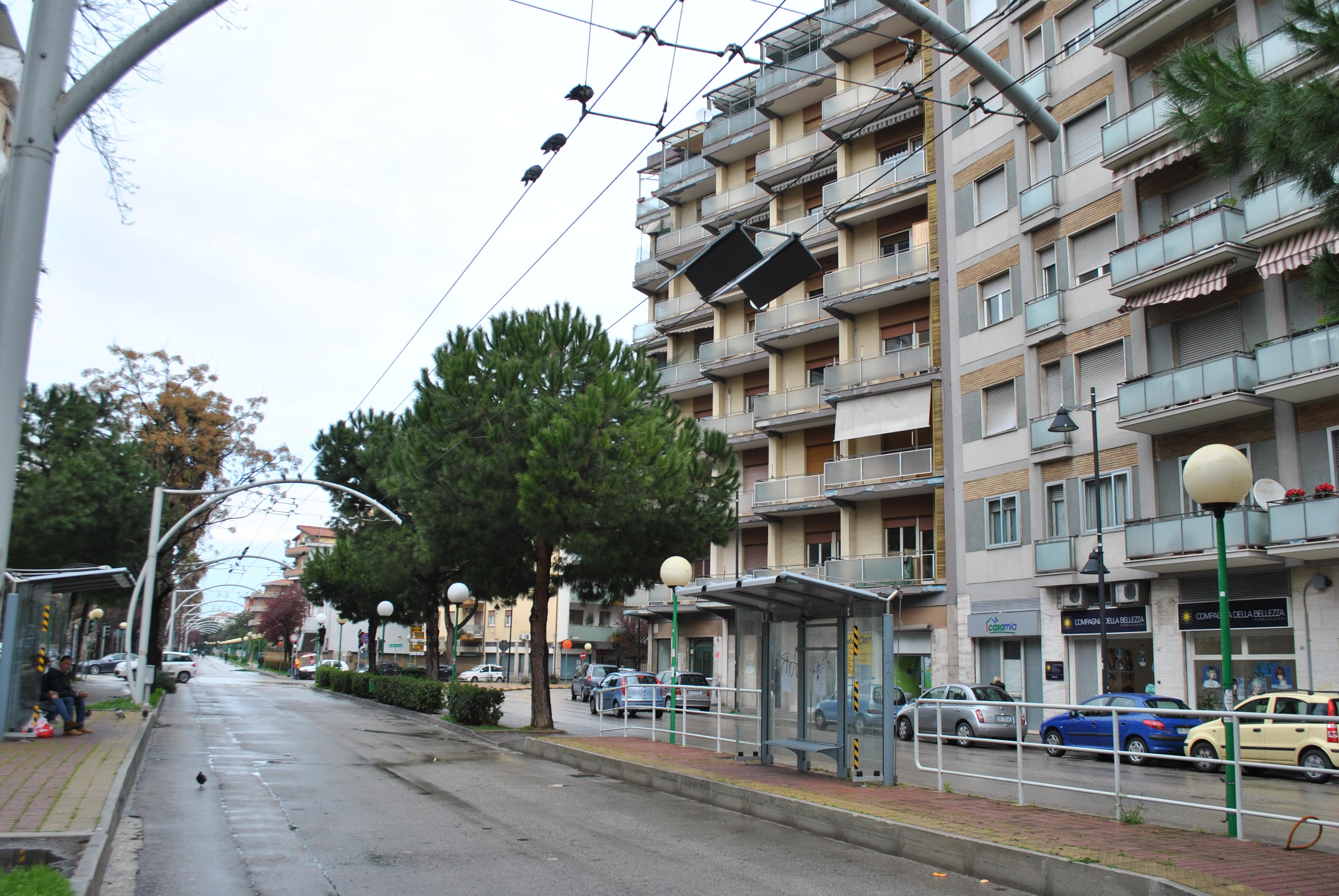
The "Strada Parco" bikeway in 2016, when it had already been equipped with overhead wires for trolleybuses and stops for the planned service. A typical stop is shown here.

The first APTS Phileas trolleybus was delivered in October 2011. Construction was suspended for the better part of two years, from around spring 2012, largely because of efforts by the activist group that opposed allowing vehicles on the Strada Parco, but resumed in December 2013. The first overhead wires were strung in May 2014. Manufacturer APTS declared bankruptcy in November 2014 and was dissolved.

A trolleybus borrowed from the nearby Chieti trolleybus system, Van Hool A330T No. 304, carried out tests of the completed infrastructure on 7 March 2017. Only one Phileas trolleybus had been delivered, and by 2018 it had been put up for sale. (It was moved to the site of a used-vehicles dealer, who by 2021 had sold it to the Chișinău trolleybus system.) In March 2019, local officials announced that they had placed an order with Van Hool for six Exqui.City 18 trolleybuses to replace the cancelled APTS order. It subsequently came to light that this order had not yet received full approval, but in February 2021 the order was confirmed. The vehicles would be equipped with batteries and In-Motion Charging for limited ability to operate in service away from the overhead wiring. The outermost portions of the route, in both Pescara and Montesilvano, would not be equipped with overhead wires.

The first two Van Hool Exqui.City trolleybuses were delivered in September 2022, and by the end of October all six had been received. In January 2024, local officials permanently closed the former railway right-of-way long known as Strada Parco (formally Via Castellamare Adriatico) to uses such as parking and a weekly market, in preparation for more regular trolleybus test runs and eventual introduction of trolleybus service. The earlier name Filò having been dropped, the planned service was now named La Verde (the Green One). Test runs began 22 February 2024, were suspended after a few days, and resumed on 7 May.

A trolleybus passing a stop during the final round of test runs in August 2025

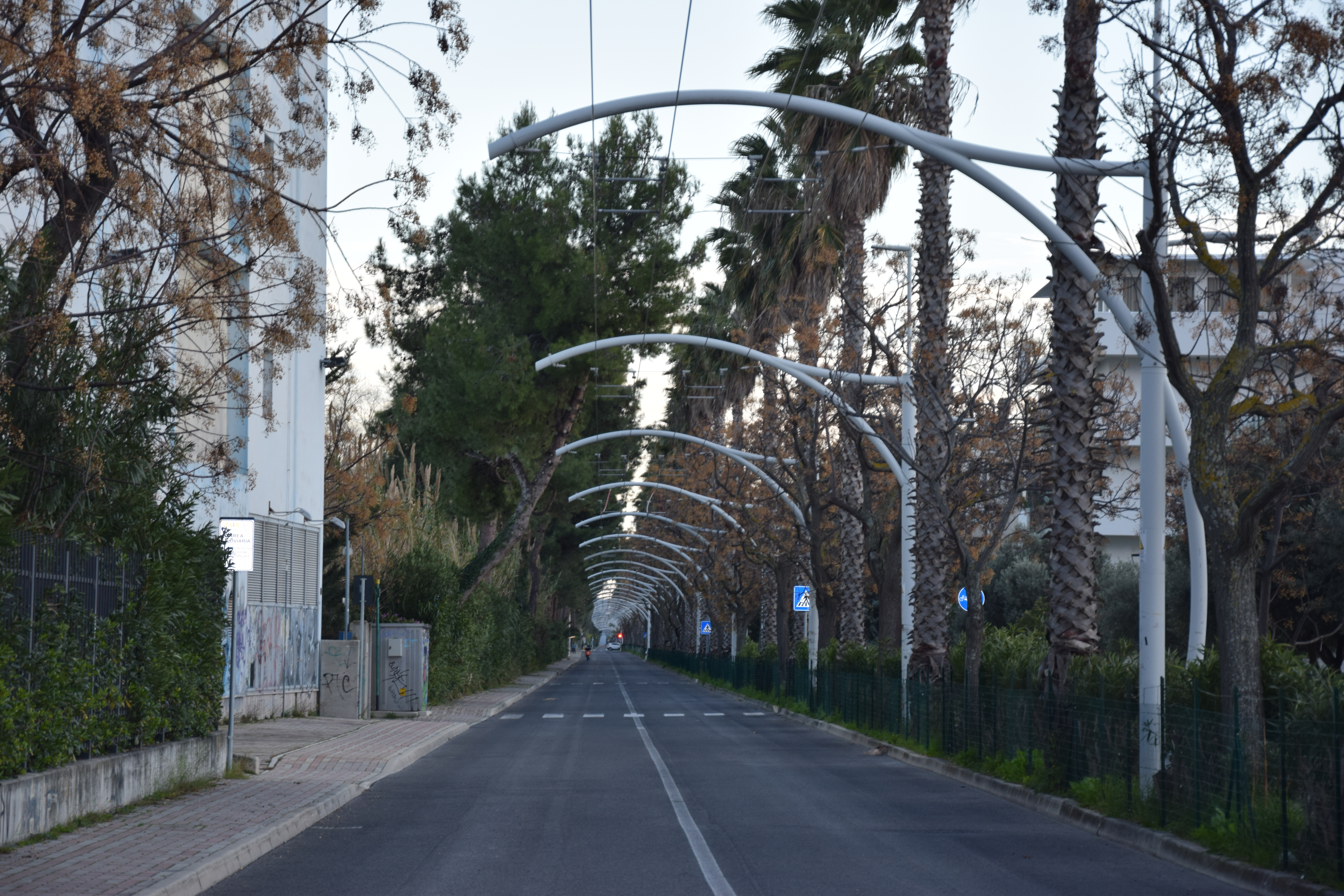
The overhead wires are suspended from distinctive arched bracket arms.

On 28 April 2025, the 8 km (5.0 mi) busway route between Pescara and Montesilvano opened for service, but temporarily operated by battery-powered buses, because the six trolleybuses had not yet completed the required certification testing, administered by the national regulatory body ANSFISA. In addition to the name La Verde, the service was designated route V1. The service with battery buses lasted only one month until being suspended from 28 May as the result of a temporary court order won by the Strada Parco group, which was continuing to fight against the conversion of the bikeway for public transport use. That restriction was eventually lifted, and the final round of regular test runs, or simulated service, with trolleybuses began in August, for a period of about 20 days.

The line reopened, and trolleybus service was finally introduced on 11 September 2025. Service operates on a 10-minute headway Mondays to Saturdays and 30 minutes on Sundays and holidays.

=== Route ===
The system consists of a single route, branded as La Verde (the Green One) and numbered V1:

- V1: Pescara (Piazza Repubblica) – Montesilvano (Pala Dean Martin)

Of its overall length of 8 km (5.0 mi), 6 km (3.7 mi) operates in a separate busway, and only this section is equipped with overhead trolley wires. On the route's two outer sections, the trolleybuses follow public streets, and they run on battery power because of the absence of overhead wiring.

=== Fleet ===
The fleet of the current system comprises six 18-metre (60 ft) vehicles, with batteries enabling them to operate away from the overhead wires to a limited extent:

- 6 Van Hool Exqui.City 18T articulated trolleybuses (with Kiepe electrical equipment), built and delivered in 2022. They entered service when the system opened, in 2025.

== See also ==
- List of trolleybus systems in Italy
- Metromare – A similar trolleybus–BRT line built in a former railway right-of-way, in Rimini
