= Trolleybuses in Chieti =

Public transit system in Abruzzo, Italy

Chieti trolleybus system
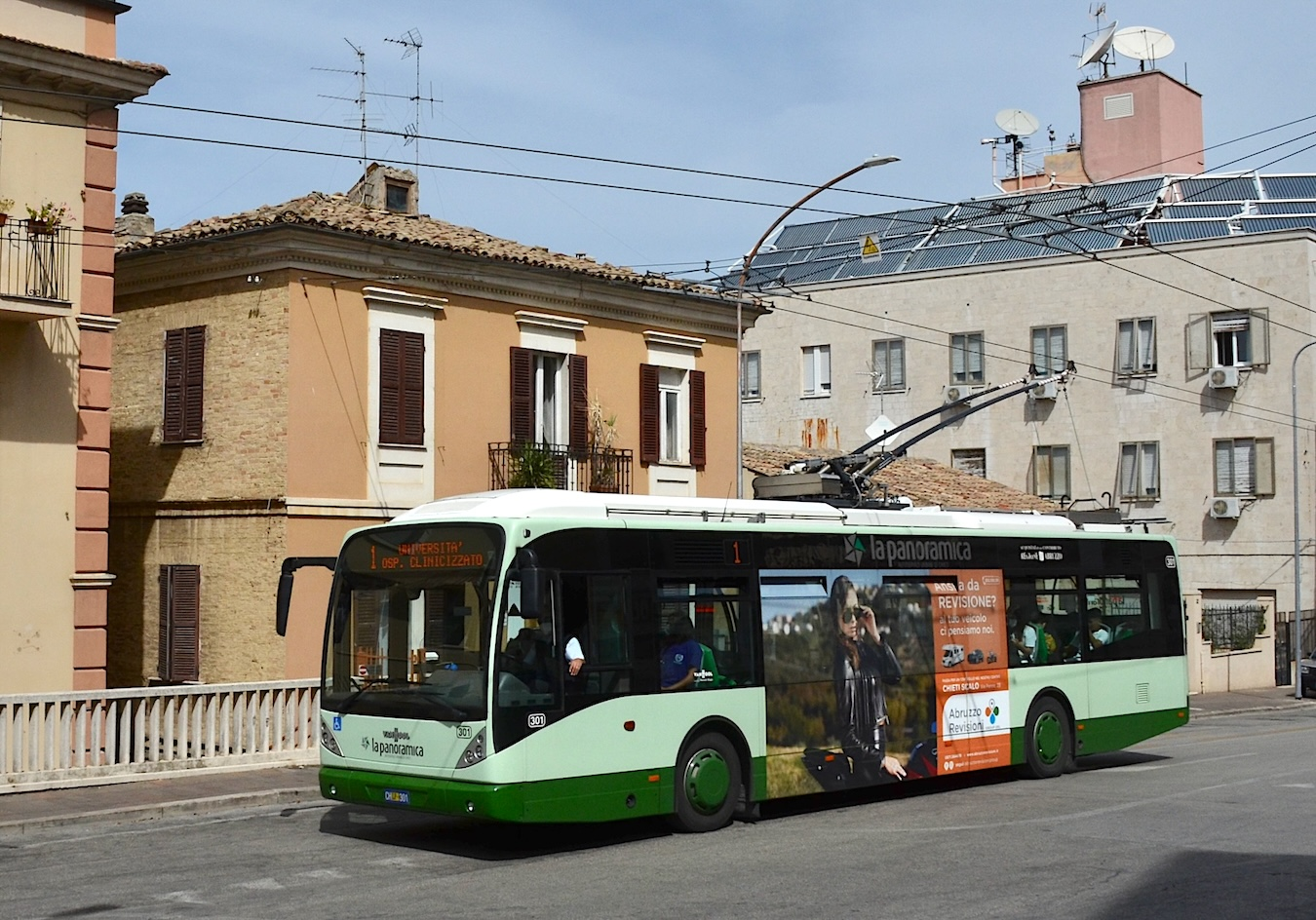
- A trolleybus in Chieti in 2022

Operation
- Locale: Chieti, Abruzzo, Italy

Statistics
First era: 1950–1992
- Routes: 1
- Operators: Ferrovie Adriatico–Appennino (1950–1985); La Panoramica (1985–)
- Electrification: 600 Volts DC
- Route length: 8.3 km (5.2 mi)
Current era: since 2009
- Routes: 1
- Operator: La Panoramica
- Electrification: 750 V DC
- Route length: 9.6 km (6.0 mi)
- Website: http://www.gruppolapanoramica.it/la%2Dpanoramica/ La Panoramica (in Italian)

The Chieti trolleybus system (Italian: Filovia di Chieti) forms part of the public transport network of the city and comune of Chieti, in the region of Abruzzo, central Italy. Comprising one urban route, the system opened in 1950, but a suspension of trolleybus service that began around the end of 1992 ultimately lasted almost 17 years, with service finally resuming in September 2009. In 2011, 17 Italian cities or metropolitan areas had trolleybus systems, counting four where the system was a new one under construction, and of all of these, Chieti was the smallest in population. By the early 1980s, it was already the smallest Italian city to retain trolleybus service (with Carrara second).

After service ceased at the end of 1992, it was described as a temporary suspension, with plans to repair deteriorated infrastructure, refurbish the vehicles, and reopen the route. Those plans did proceed, but with more delays than originally anticipated and with the scope of the plans expanded to include the construction of three new route sections and refurbishment of the vehicles. Construction only began in 2002, and limited service was reintroduced in September 2009, almost 17 years after trolleybus service had been suspended.

Trolleybus service on the section between Piazzale dei Martiri Pennesi and Ospedale Clinicizzato, which had been part of route 1 since the suspension of trolleybus service years earlier but always been served only by diesel buses, was finally introduced on 15 April 2013. In July 2013, five new low-floor trolleybuses built by Van Hool were placed in service, and by November 2013 they were the only trolleybuses still in service on the system.

== History ==
The Chieti trolleybus system was inaugurated on 1 August 1950, in place of an obsolete tramway that had been in operation since 1905. The tramway had followed a different, somewhat less-steep routing on the steepest part of the replacing trolleybus route. The system's single route connected Chieti railway station (Stazione FS), located in the valley of the Pescara River (in the large suburb of Chieti Scalo), with the city centre, situated on a hill. The line's route was Madonna delle Piane (Piazzale Martiri Pennesi) – Stazione FS – city centre – Sant'Anna, with a steep and very tortuous path between the station and the city centre. Most of that route is still being followed in the 2020s. On the steepest 4-kilometre (2.5 mi) section, the grade averages 8 1/2 percent. The route included two sections of two-way "single-track" wiring, controlled by signals, which could be used in only one direction at a time. Both sections were at the outer ends of the route, one in Chieti Scalo and the other leading to Piazzale Sant'Anna terminus.

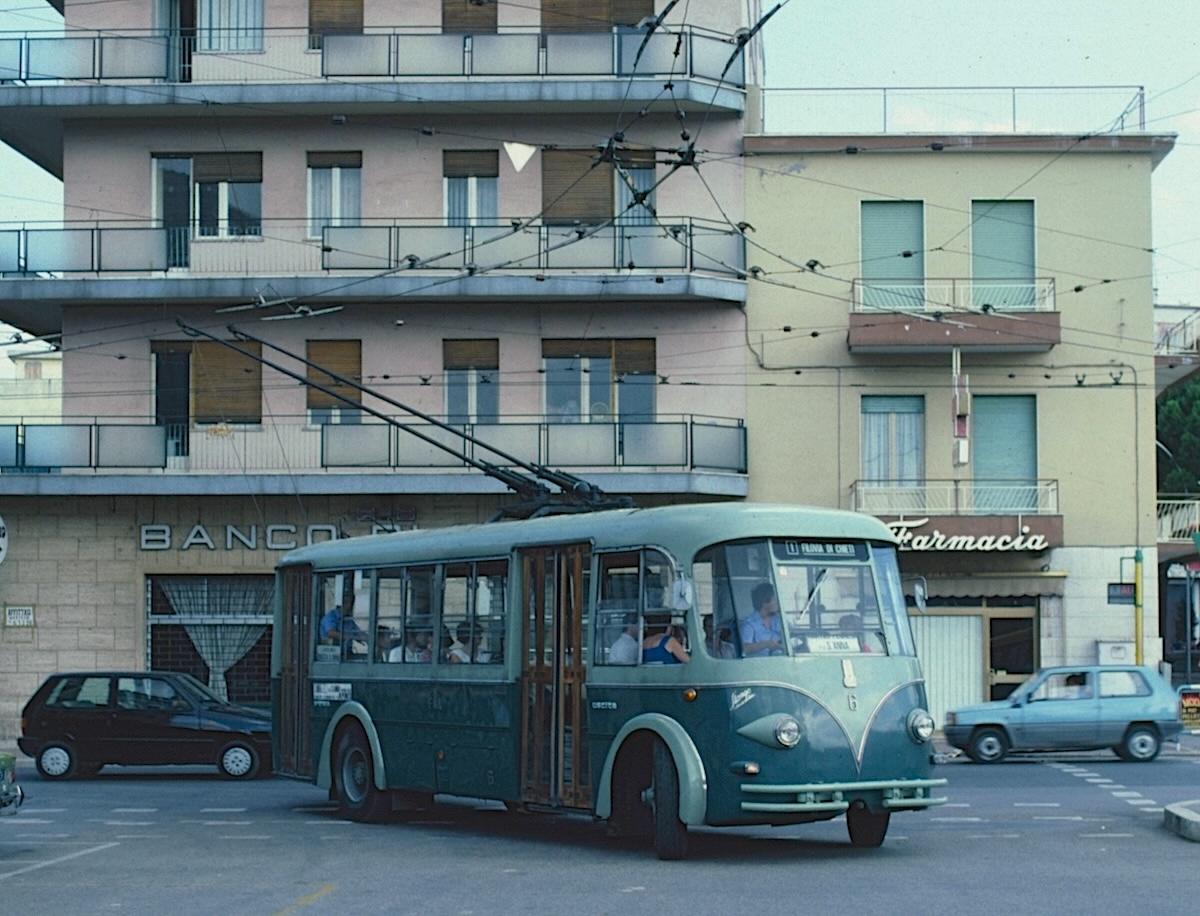
Fiat/Stanga trolleybus 6 turning into the forecourt of Chieti railway station

The fleet of six Fiat trolleybuses was expanded with one similar new vehicle in 1955 and later by the acquisition of four used trolleybuses from the Genoa trolleybus system–two in 1959 and two more in 1963. The trolleybuses wore a two-tone green livery (light green above the waist, dark green below), which was the standard livery for urban trams and trolleybuses throughout Italy during the 1930s and 1940s, and were still wearing these colours in the early 1980s.

Around the late 1960s or early 1970s, pedestrianisation led to the closure of the route section along Via Spaventa and Corso Marrucino, in the city centre, and left trolleybuses only on the parallel routing using Via Asinio Herio and the westernmost section of Via Arniense in that area. Regular trolleybus operation continued for many years with relatively few changes apart from the closure of that one city-centre route section and the renewal of the fleet with 10 new vehicles built by Menarini in 1985–1986, which changed the fleet livery to all-over orange. In 1982, fares were still being collected by a conductor, seated at the rear door of each trolleybus. La Panoramica took over operation of the system from the original operator, Adriatic–Appenine Railways (Ferrovie Adriatico Appennino, or FAA), in 1985.

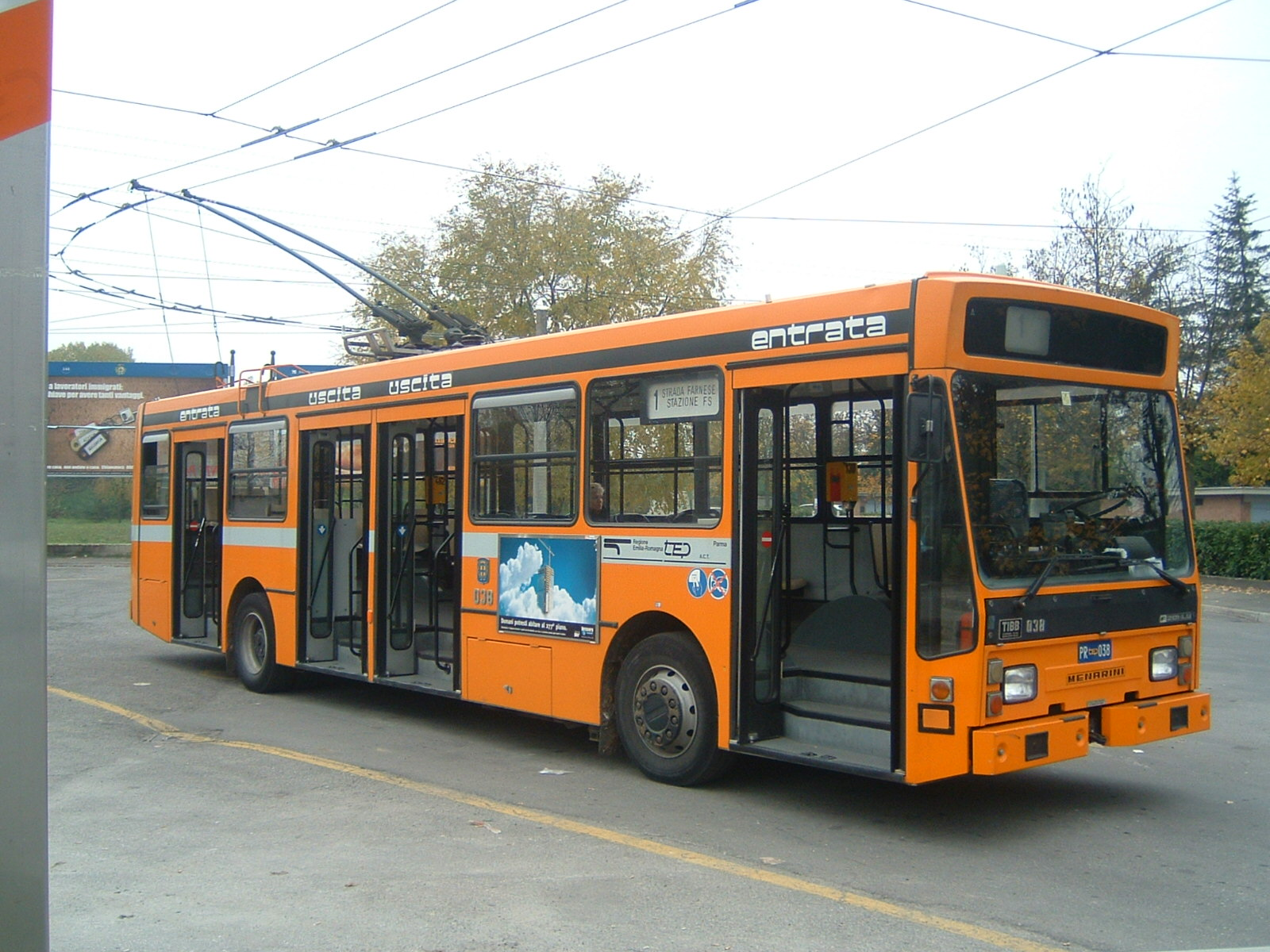
A Menarini trolleybus of the Parma system that was of the same type as the 10 Chieti purchased in 1985 (and wearing a similar orange paint scheme)

=== Closure and renovation ===
However, by the late 1980s the route's physical infrastructure was deemed to be in poor condition, and the necessary funds to update it were lacking. Consequently, in December 1992, it was deemed necessary to suspend the service until such time as a thorough repair or complete reconstruction could be undertaken. The suspension went into effect either on the first day of 1993 or on 19 December 1992. The reconstruction work, originally expected to take place within just a few years, was delayed by lack of funding and did not finally begin until 2002, and then dragged on for several more years, with many breaks. In the meantime, local officials had decided to change the routing through the city centre, to extend the route at its lower end from Piazzale dei Martiri Pennesi (Madonna delle Piane) to Ospedale Clinicizzato, and to construct a new branch north of Piazzale Martiri Pennesi, to Via San Martino.

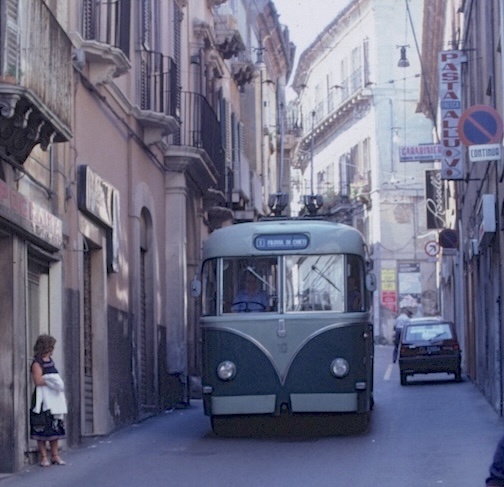
One of the 1953 vehicles acquired used from the Genoa trolleybus system, in the very narrow Via Arniense – a two-way route section from which all buses were banned in 2003 (during the long suspension of all trolleybus service)

The 10 Menarini trolleybuses had been placed in storage. Seven were ultimately chosen to be refurbished for a return to service. By 2009, an order had been placed with Van Hool for three new low-floor trolleybuses, which was later expanded to five units. Installation of overhead wiring along the extension to Ospedale Clinicizzato began in 2005, and by 2006 all work to renew old overhead wiring and construct new sections had been completed. The refurbishment of the seven 1985 Menarini trolleybuses was completed in 2009. That work included repainting in a new livery of two-tone green with a diagonal yellow band separating the two shades of green. Three vehicles were retrofitted with wheelchair lifts.

=== Second era, 2009 to present ===
The trolleybus system was officially reopened on 26 September 2009. Two trolleybuses made a few trips for the public on that date, and regular service restarted two days later. New substations installed as part of the reconstruction work increased the overhead line voltage from 600 V to 750 V. Both sections of two-way single-track wiring had been eliminated, through the installation of a second set of wires. In the city centre, the route had been changed to follow Via Silvino Olivieri and Via Salomone in place of the former routing along very narrow Via Arniense, as a result of the banning of all buses and other heavy vehicles from Via Arniense effective 1 August 2003. Although equipped with trolley wires for both directions of travel, Via Arniense was so narrow that it could only be traversed in one direction at a time; only buses and trolleybuses were permitted to run eastbound there, with special traffic signals controlling the flow.

In Chieti Scalo, the full route 1 continued beyond Piazza M. Pennesi to Ospedale Clinicizzato, but construction of trolleybus infrastructure on that extension had yet to begin, so the trolleybuses in service were only able to operate short-turn trips ending at Piazzale Martiri Pennesi. For this reason, only two or three of the 10–11 scheduled vehicle duties on route 1 were trolleybus-operated at this stage, and these only operated in the morning and early afternoon, on weekdays only, and diesel buses were continuing to provide most service. Service was suspended again for nine months, from late December 2009 to late September 2010, after high winds damaged the wires on one section. Trolleybus infrastructure for the once-planned 1.6-kilometre-long (0.99 mi) new branch to Via San Martino was completed in 2003, but it was never part of route 1, and following a change in plans, it has not been brought into use.

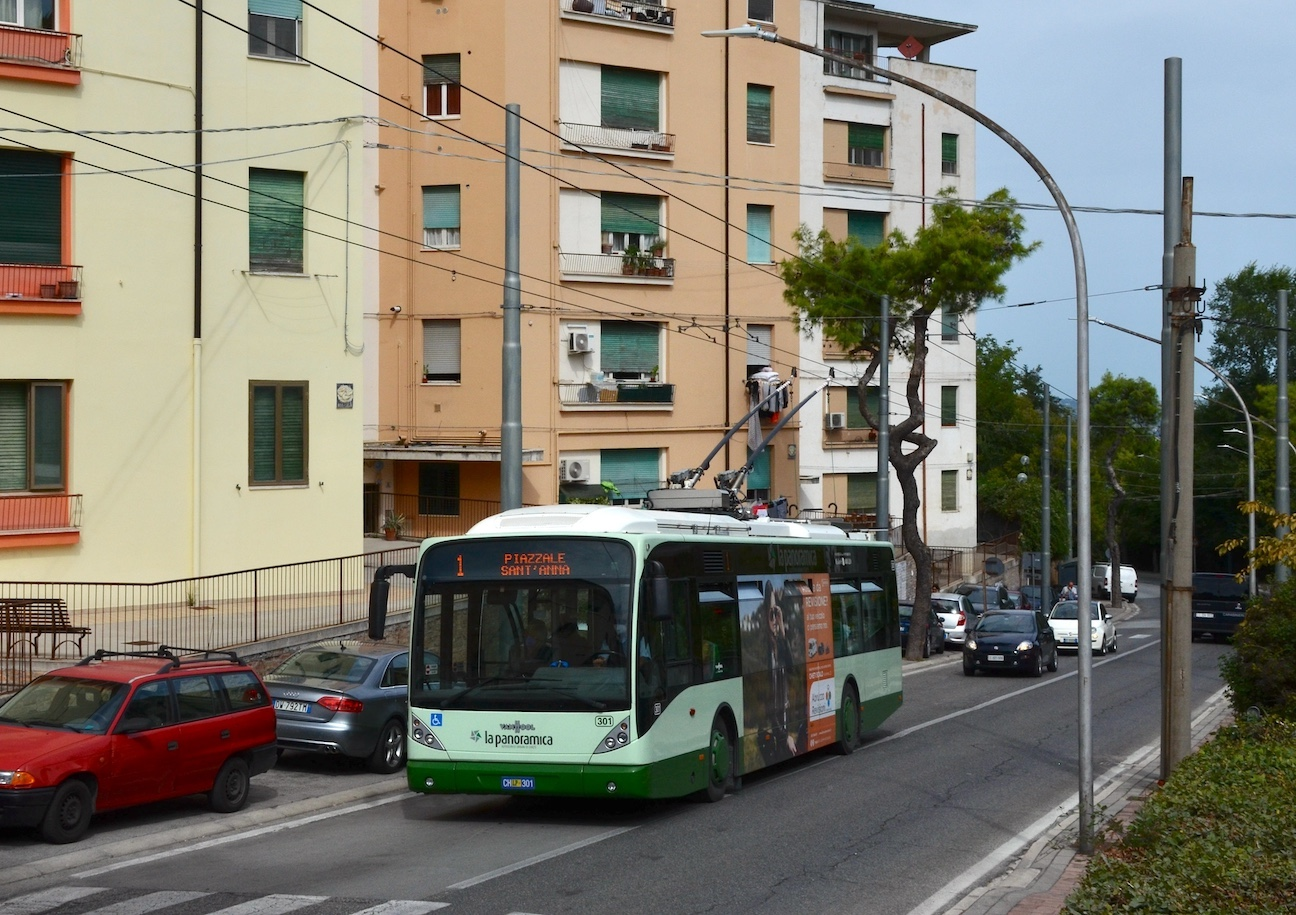
A Van Hool trolleybus climbing a moderate grade on Via Madonna della Misericordia in 2022

The new section of trolleybus route between Piazzale Martiri Pennesi and Ospedale Cliniccizato finally opened on 15 April 2013, having been part of route 1 for two decades but only served by diesel buses until now. This increased the overall length of the trolleybus route to 9.6 km (6.0 mi). In the direction of Ospedale, the new section included a 170-metre-long (560 ft) section of trolleybus-only roadway running parallel to Via dei Vestini and through the campus of D'Annunzio University of Chieti–Pescara.

The five new Van Hool trolleybuses were delivered in 2012. They entered service on 1 July 2013. Within a few months, the refurbished older trolleybuses were out of service, and diesel buses were still providing some of the route's service.

In March 2017, one of Chieti's Van Hool trolleybuses was briefly loaned to transport officials in Pescara, for use in testing the infrastructure of a new Pescara trolleybus system that had been constructed but not yet opened.

== Current services ==
Line 1 is currently operated as the route Ospedale Clinicizzato (Hospital and adjacent university campus) – Piazzale dei Martiri Pennesi (Madonna delle Piane) – Chieti railway station (in Chieti Scalo) – city centre – Sant'Anna, with a limited number of trolleybuses. The trolleybuses are supplemented with diesel-powered buses at most times.

For many years, at least from the 1970s, trolleybus service was suspended for the month of August every year (a practice also common on other small Italian trolleybus systems), with diesel buses substituted. However, in 2013, the operation of trolleybuses continued throughout August, and this was noted again in 2015.

For many years (since at least the 1980s), the basic headway on route 1 was 15 minutes, but in 2021 or 2022 it was lengthened to 20 minutes.

== Fleet ==
=== Past fleet ===
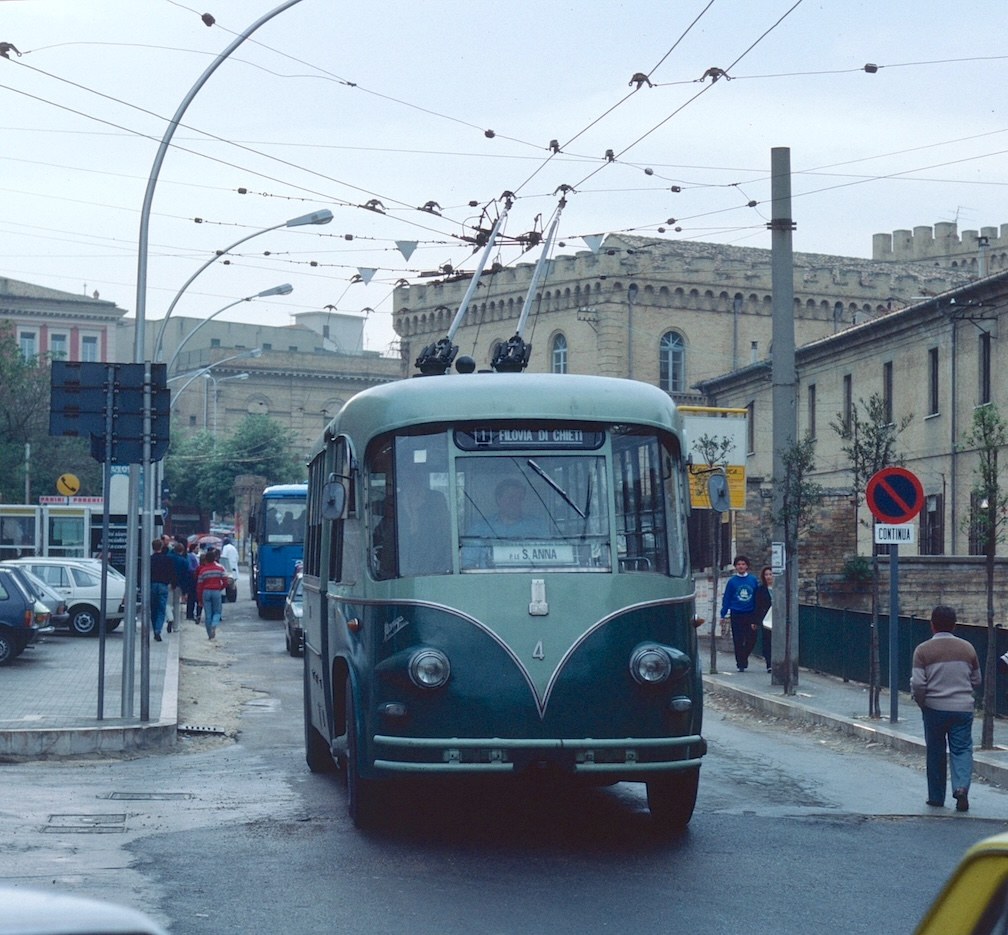
One of the original 1950-built trolleybuses, still in service in 1985, by which time the central driving position was considered very antiquated

The following trolleybuses were used on Chieti's trolleybus system in the past:

- 8 Fiat 668F, built 1950–1955. The original fleet of six (built 1950) was supplemented in 1955 by one similar new vehicle (No. 7) and subsequently by the acquisition of four more 668F's from the Genoa trolleybus system in 1959 (Nos. 8–9, built 1950) and 1963 (Nos. 10–11, built 1953). Nos. 1–7 had a central driving position, common on Italian trolleybuses in the mid-20th century but considered very antiquated by the 1980s, while Nos. 10 and 11 had right-hand drive. All eight had TIBB electrical equipment. The last units were retired in early 1986.
- 10 Menarini 201 FLU (Nos. 212–221, originally 12–21); built in 1985, and all or most entered service in early 1986. Seven were refurbished in the mid-2000s (Nos. 212, 213, 215, 217, 219, 220 and 221), while the other three were scrapped after being cannibalised for spare parts for the remainder of the fleet. For unknown reasons, only three or four of the seven refurbished vehicles were ever actually returned to service.

The few active Menarini vehicles were taken out of service in 2013 and stored. Two returned to service in September 2014, but were withdrawn again around the beginning of November 2014 and have not returned to service since, though five remained in storage at operator La Panoramica's bus depot (away from the trolleybus depot) in 2022.

=== Current fleet ===
Chieti's present trolleybus fleet is made up of only the following five vehicles:

- Five Van Hool A330T trolleybuses with Kiepe electrical propulsion equipment (nos. 301–305), built in 2012. They are equipped with auxilary diesel engines permitting limited movement away from the overhead wires.

== See also ==
- List of trolleybus systems in Italy
