= Cantono-Frigerio system =

Electric power supply system

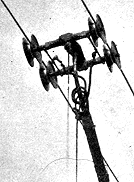
Trolley of the Cantono-Frigerio-System

The Cantono Frigerio system was an Italian electric power supply for trolleybuses with two wires about 20 inches (510 mm) apart being contacted by a four-wheeled collector on a single trolley pole. It was only ever used in Italy. In English publications it was often described as the Filovia system, although the Italian term filovia means literally wire way, and more loosely wire street, i.e. a trolleybus line or a trolleybus system.

== History ==
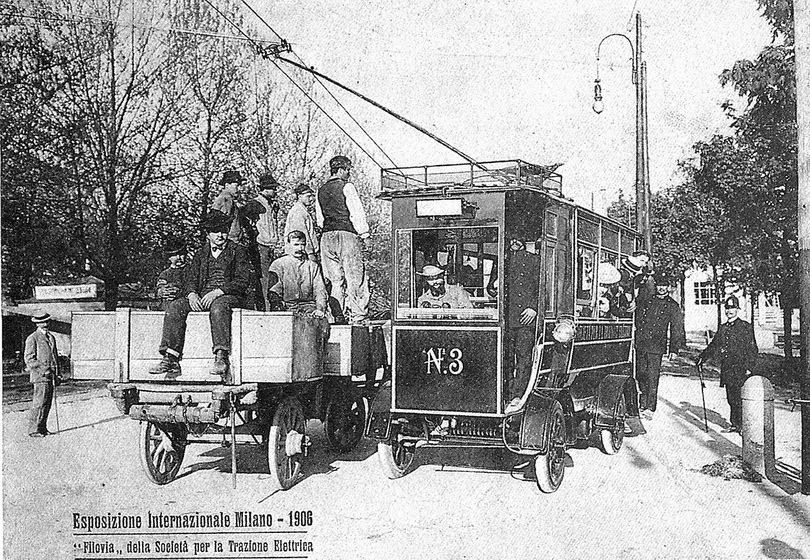
A trolleybus passes a cart at the Milan International, 1906

Werner Siemens introduced the first collector for trackless vehicles with his Electromote cart in 1882, and in 1901, Max Schiemann demonstrated sliding contact shoes, which were pressed by springs against the overhead wires. Five years later Eugenio Cantono from Rome combined these two principles and exhibited six trolleybuses at the world's fair Milan International, 1906.

The power supply differed from those in other countries in that, as a collector, a four-wheeled truck ran underneath the wires, held in place by a trolley pole in the usual manner. The possible deviation on either side of the direct route was 10–12 feet (3.0 to 3.5 m). The cars were usually equipped with two 15-horsepower (11 kW) motors and had a carrying capacity of 20 to 24 passengers. Its design and construction have been so perfected that it would take easily very sharp curves, and would not leave the trolley wires even when running at a speed of 18 miles per hour (29 km/h). They could master larger grades than trams, it was claimed. The overhead wires had a diameter of 3/8 inch (9.5 mm) for 600 Volt direct current and could be used in both directions. The drivers stood upright in a cab similar to that of a tram.

Cantono was supported by the Fabbrica Rotabili Avantreni Motori (F.R.A.M.) in Genoa, which he had founded, and by the Società per la Trazione Elettrica in Milan, which produced Frigerio branded cars. This led to the term Cantono Frigerio system.

The system was very successful in Italy, where trackless trolley lines were very highly regarded in the first quarter of the 20th century. A total of more than 50 miles (80 km) of line were in use to the satisfaction of the municipalities by 1916. In some cities, subsidies were paid for establishing such lines.

== Systems ==
Line	Dates	Picture	Comments
Pescara–Castellamare Adriatico	1903 to 1904		The first trolleybuses of Italy ran on the route at Castellamare Adriatico. The line was opened in 1903. The trolleybuses were equipped with the Cantono Frigerio system, with two 550 V direct current motors and a noisy rear axle chain drive. They had solid rubber tyres and a maximum speed of 15 miles per hour (24 km/h).
La Spezia–Porto Venere	1906 to 1908		The line from La Spezia to Fezzano was opened on 10 February 1906 and offered 20 return trips per day. After initial praise, the capacity turned out to be insufficient, and larger cars would have been required. The operation was hampered by the rough track and regular derailments of the collector trolley. There were recurring problems with the brakes and the electrical insulation of the vehicles. Therefore, the council of La Spezia decided in 1908 to build a tram to Cadimare, which replaced the trolleybus in November 1909.
Milan	1906		The Società per la Trazione Elettrica demonstrated at the Milan International Exposition, 1906 from 28 April to 11 November 1906 the benefits of the system on a circular track around the exhibition centre on Piazza d'Armi.
Siena	1907 to 1920		Trolleybuses were commissioned in Siena on 24 March 1907. The approximately 4.5-mile (7.2 km) long line connected Fontebecci and Valli with the city (Piazza Indipendenza) and the railway station. It was initially operated by the Società Imprese Elettriche Senesi (SIES), which was later renamed to Società Anonima Filovie Senesi (SAFS). The narrow and steep streets in the town caused difficulties, so that the company was liquidated on 13 April 1920.
Ivrea–Cuorgnè	1908 to 1935		The line from Ivrea to Cuorgnè was built according to plans of the surveyor Vallino. It was opened on 30 March 1908. It had the nickname Filovia del Poeta (Poet's line) because it passed the house of the poet Giuseppe Giacosa. It initially offered a very satisfactory service, but was replaced by buses when passenger numbers increased at the end of the 1920s.
Cuneo	1908 -?		The construction of the line in Cuneo began in April 1908. In June 1908, it was tested and then officially opened on 1 August 1908 from the new church to the railway station. The cars, which had been exhibited in Milan, were used up to 1926. The last section of the line was closed in 1968, but may no longer be used with this single-pole system.
Argegno–San Fedele Intelvi	1909 to 1922		The Filovia Valle d'Intelvi from Argegno at Lake Como to San Fedele Intelvi was operated from 4 July 1909 to the end of 1922. It climbed up a steep zig-zag road with a gradient of up to 11% or 13%.
L'Aquila	1909 to 1924		The L'Aquila Città Filovia was operated from 1909 to 1924.
Alba–Barolo	1910 to 1919		The line from Alba to Barolo was planned and built by the Società per la Trazione Elettrica in Mailand and operated by the Società Filovia Albesi. It was opened on 26 September 1910 and decommissioned in 1919 due to significant technical problems.
Enego–Primolano	1915 to 1918		Most Italian trolleybus lines were used not only for transporting passengers but also goods. The military line from Enego Primolano was opened in 1910 for transporting goods and especially ammunition.
Edolo–Ponte di Legno	1915 to 1918		The military line from Edolo to Ponte di Legno transported mainly goods and ammunition.
Marostica–Puffele	1916 to 1919		During World War I, the military line from Marostica Puffele was used for transporting goods and ammunition.
Breganze–Turcio	Approx. 1916		The military line from Breganze to Turcio was used mainly for transporting ammunition during World War I.

== See also ==
- List of trolleybus systems
