= List of trolleybus systems in Italy =

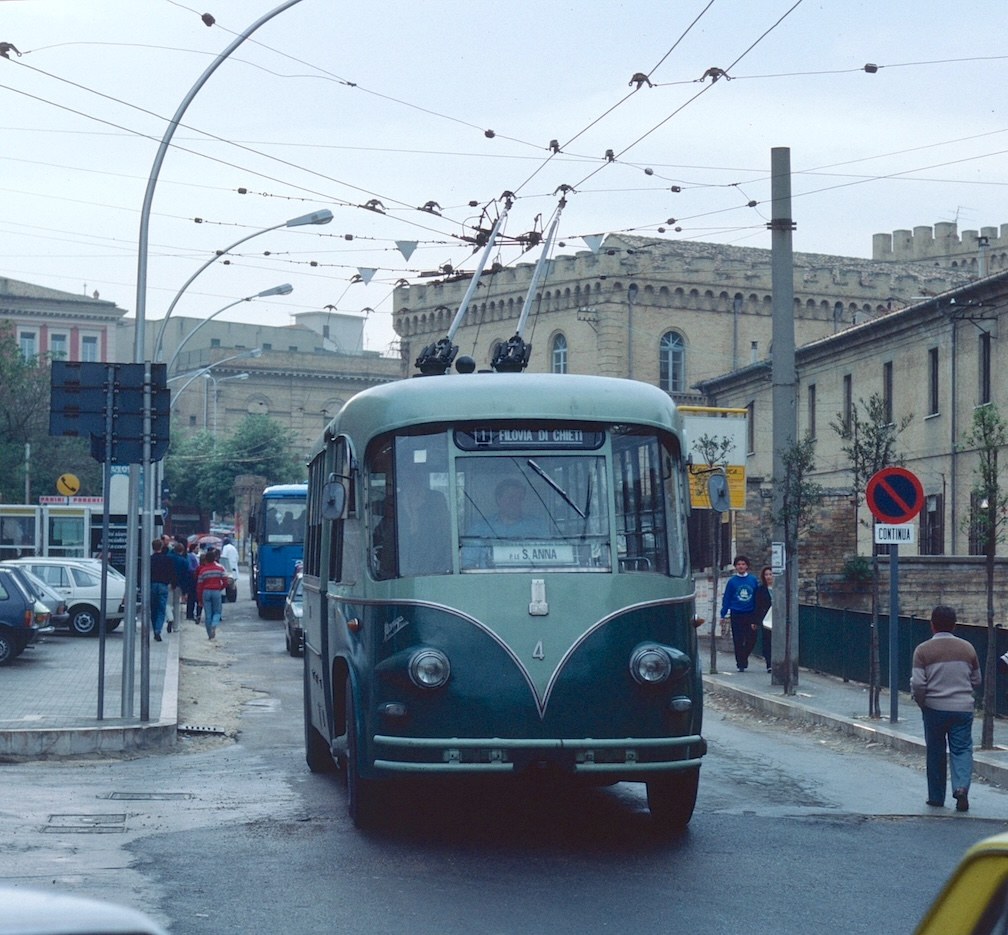
A Fiat 668F trolleybus on the Chieti trolleybus system. This was a common type of trolleybus in Italy in the middle decades of the 20th century.

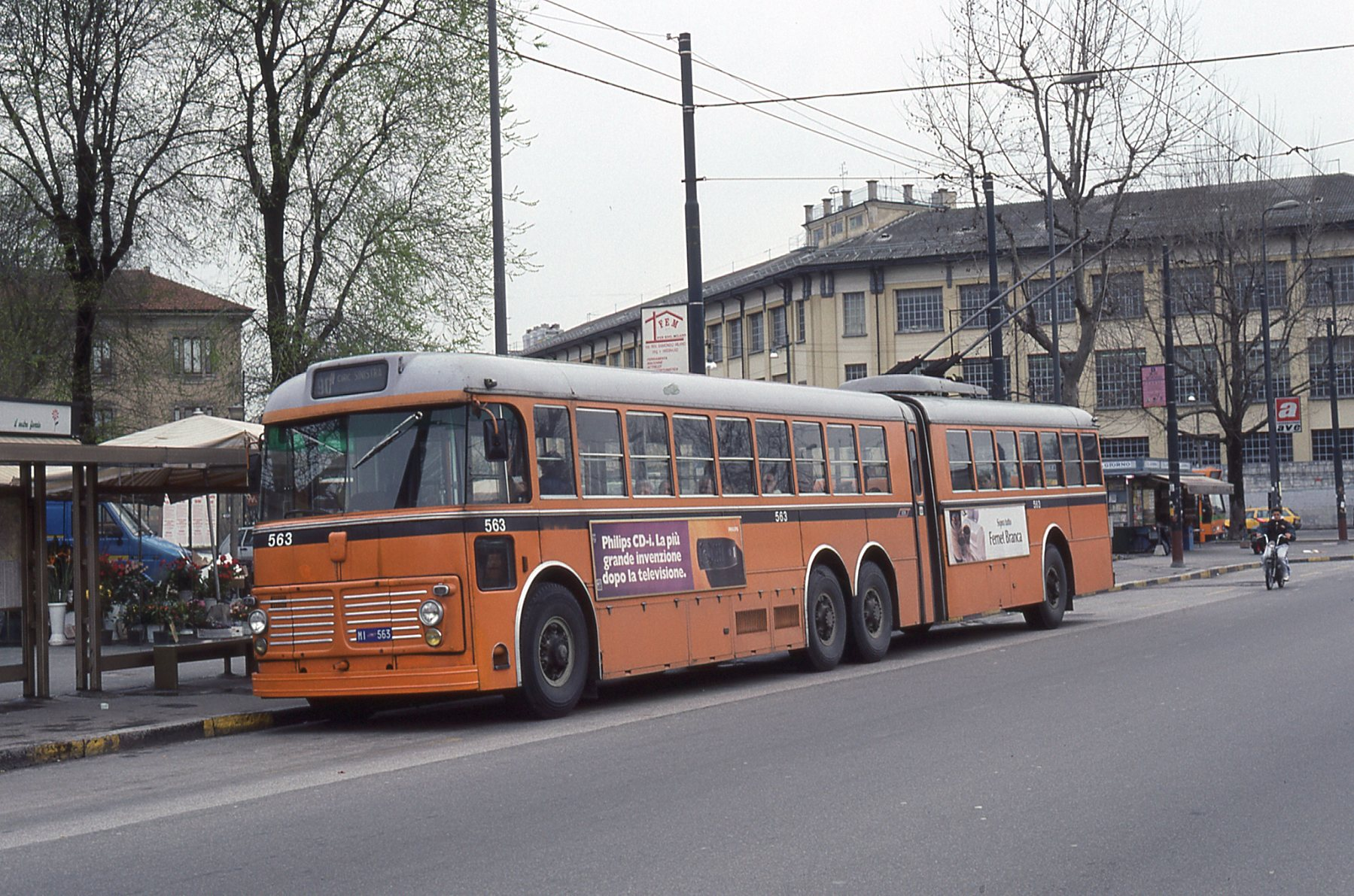
Fiat 2472 Viberti CGE articulated trolleybus no. 563, now withdrawn, operated on the Milan trolleybus system.

This is a list of trolleybus systems in Italy by Regione. It includes all trolleybus systems, past and present.

== Italian peninsula ==
=== Abruzzo ===
Name of system	Location	Date (from)	Date (to)	Notes
	L'Aquila	19 May 1909	31 March 1924	
	Chieti	1 August 1950		Operation suspended circa Dec 1992 – 26 September 2009. See also Trolleybuses in Chieti.
	Pescara	1903	1904	Interurban line to Castellamare Adriatico. First trolleybus line in Italy.
La Verde (operated by TUA)	Pescara	11 September 2025		Construction of a new system, to Montesilvano, began in 2009, but after numerous delays only opened in 2025. See also Trolleybuses in Pescara.

=== Aosta Valley ===
Name of system	Location	Date (from)	Date (to)	Notes
	Châtillon	1920	1925	

=== Apulia (Puglia) ===
Name of system	Location	Date (from)	Date (to)	Notes
	Bari	1939	1974	Reopening was planned (of one route, 4). Five new vehicles were built in 1997 and delivered in 2001, and three more were ordered in 2007 and delivered in 2008–09. Renovation of the wiring began in December 2008 and was completed in 2011, but the planned reopening never came to fruition. In July 2022 dismantling of 11 km of disused overhead wires began, while the renovated wires along route 4 were to be retained. See also Trolleybuses in Bari.
	Bari	20 November 1978	16 December 1987	Reopening was planned (of one route, 4). Five new vehicles were built in 1997 and delivered in 2001, and three more were ordered in 2007 and delivered in 2008–09. Renovation of the wiring began in December 2008 and was completed in 2011, but the planned reopening never came to fruition. In July 2022 dismantling of 11 km of disused overhead wires began, while the renovated wires along route 4 were to be retained. See also Trolleybuses in Bari.
	Lecce	12 Jan 2012		See also Trolleybuses in Lecce.

=== Campania ===
Name of system	Location	Date (from)	Date (to)	Notes
	Avellino	16 September 1947	1 November 1973	System connected Avellino, Atripalda and Mercogliano.
AIR Campania	Avellino	3 Apr 2023		The new system was under construction since 2009, but after numerous delays was inaugurated only in April 2023. Service has been suspended since 6 July 2023. See also Trolleybuses in Avellino
	Capua - Caserta - Maddaloni	28 March 1961	26 October 1972	
ANM (urban)	Naples	8 May 1940		System included suburban line to Ercolano (Herculaneum) and Torre del Greco until 2009. Operator was ATAN until 1995. See also Trolleybuses in Naples
CTP (suburban)	Naples - Secondigliano - Aversa - Teverola	26 January 1964	6 August 2015	Operator was TPN until 1978. All trolleybus service has been suspended since August 2015. On 14 April 2022 CTP was declared bankrupt. The trolleybuses and infrastructure are to be auctioned off.
	Salerno	7 August 1937	August 1987	System included interurban lines to Battipaglia, Pagani, Pompeii, San Severino and Torre Angellara.

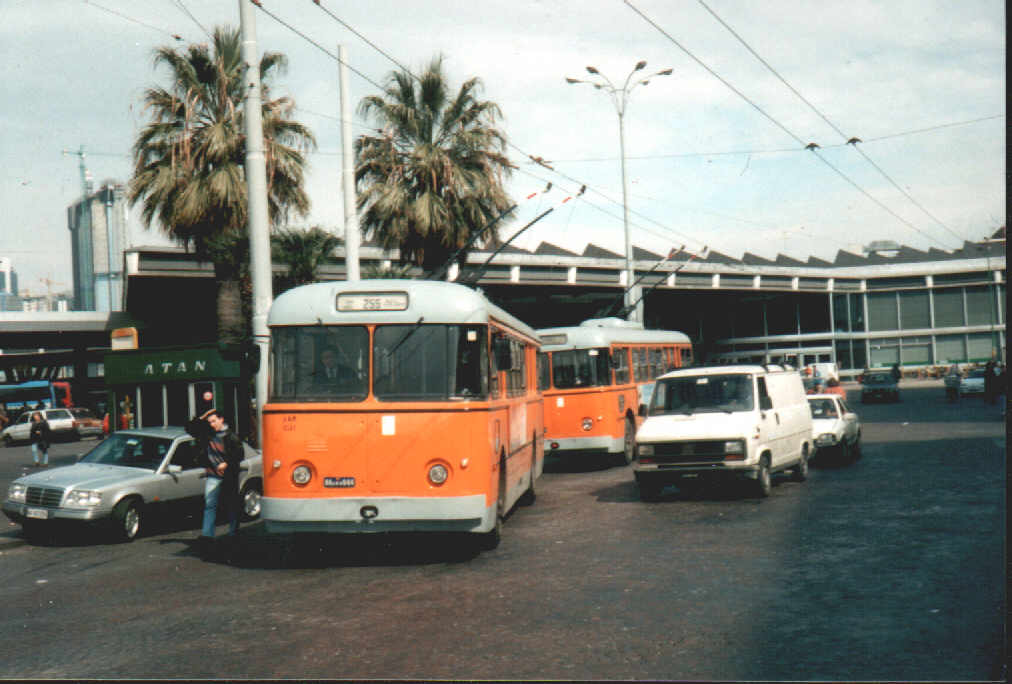
An Alfa Romeo 1000 Aerfer on the Naples ANM trolleybus system

=== Emilia-Romagna ===
Name of system	Location	Date (from)	Date (to)	Notes
	Bologna	October 1940	1945	First of three systems.
	Bologna	16 September 1955	14 June 1982	
	Bologna	4 January 1991		See also Trolleybuses in Bologna
	Ferrara	28 October 1938	25 February 1975	
	Modena	21 January 1950		Operation suspended 1996–2000, for renovation and fleet renewal. See also Trolleybuses in Modena
	Parma	25 October 1953		See also Trolleybuses in Parma
	Rimini	1 July 1939		Includes the Metromare, a trolleybus rapid transit line opened (for trolleybuses) in October 2021. See also Trolleybuses in Rimini

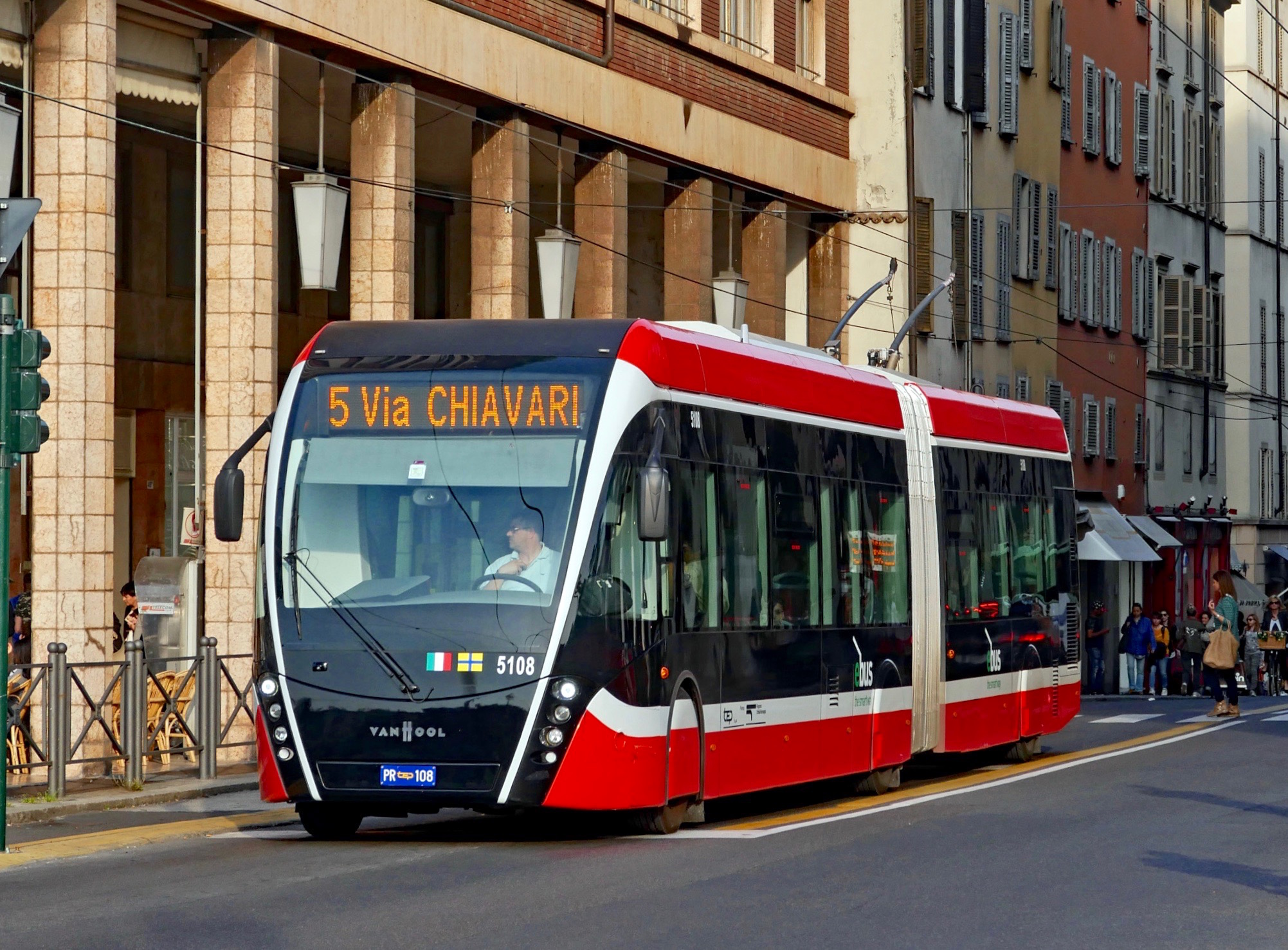
Van Hool Exquicity 18T in Parma

=== Friuli-Venezia Giulia ===
Name of system	Location	Date (from)	Date (to)	Notes
A.C.E.G.A.T.	Trieste	30 March 1935	19 April 1975	System included interurban line to Muggia.

=== Lazio ===
Name of system	Location	Date (from)	Date (to)	Notes
	Anzio - Nettuno	17 June 1939	22 January 1944	
	Rome	8 January 1937	2 July 1972	Also 1902 experimental. See also Trolleybuses in Rome
	Rome	23 March 2005		Also 1902 experimental. See also Trolleybuses in Rome

=== Liguria ===
Name of system	Location	Date (from)	Date (to)	Notes
	Genoa	13 April 1938	11 June 1973	
	Genoa	1 July 1997	-	Operation suspended 29 June 2000 – 13 December 2002 and again from May 2003 to February 2007. See also Trolleybuses in Genoa
	Sanremo	21 April 1942	c. August 2021	Decision to close system made in February 2024, but operation had already been suspended since circa August 2021. System included interurban lines to Ventimiglia and Arma di Taggia. See also Trolleybuses in Sanremo
	La Spezia	12 February 1906	November 1909	
	La Spezia	27 January 1951	-	Operation suspended Jun 1985 – 26 Nov 1988 and 9 Jun 2012 – 20 Mar 2014. See also Trolleybuses in La Spezia

=== Lombardy ===
Name of system	Location	Date (from)	Date (to)	Notes
	Argegno - San Fedele d'Intelvi	1 July 1909	21 November 1922	
	Bergamo	December 1921	9 March 1922	
	Bergamo	1949	1978	
	Brescia	1936	1968	
	Como	18 August 1938	7 June 1978	System included interurban line to Cantù and line to Swiss border at Ponte Chiasso.
	Cremona	1940	31 May 2002	
	Desenzano del Garda - Rivoltella	1920	3 March 1932	
	Gallarate - Samarate	1904	?	
	Lanzo d'Intelvi	1912	21 November 1922	
	Milan	28 October 1933		Also, in 1906 an experimental/demonstration line operated at the Esposizione Internazionale del Sempione (world's fair). See also Trolleybuses in Milan.
	Pavia	3 February 1952	1968	
	Tirano - Boscopiano	1915 July 1940	1916 1950	

Military line:

Name of system	Location	Date (from)	Date (to)	Notes
	Edolo - Ponte di Legno	1915	1918	

=== Marche ===
Name of system	Location	Date (from)	Date (to)	Notes
	Ancona	15 March 1949		See also Trolleybuses in Ancona.
FPAF	Ancona – Collemarino – Falconara Marittima	26 June 1949	1972	Closed following damage by earthquake on 14 June 1972.
	Civitanova Marche	25 March 1956	1974	
	Fermo - Porto San Giorgio	6 February 1958	31 December 1977	

=== Piedmont ===
Name of system	Location	Date (from)	Date (to)	Notes
	Alba - Barolo	26 September 1910	12 July 1919	
	Alessandria	1 February 1952	July 1974	
	Cuneo	1 August 1908	1968	
	Cuneo - Chiusa di Pesio	20 September 1909	31 December 1957	
	Ivrea - Cuorgnè	30 March 1908	31 December 1935	
	Stresa	1909	1911	
ATM (urban)	Turin	1931	May 1980	Also, in 1902 an experimental/demonstration line operated at an exposition (l'Esposizione delle Arti Decorative).
	Turin - Chieri	4 November 1951	22 December 1979	
	Turin - Rivoli	13 November 1955	4 November 1979	

=== Tuscany ===
Name of system	Location	Date (from)	Date (to)	Notes
	Carrara	5 June 1955	26 December 1985	
	Florence	11 November 1937	1 July 1973	System included interurban line to Fiesole.
	Livorno	28 October 1934	22 October 1973	
	Pisa	20 January 1952	29 February 1968	
	Siena	24 March 1907	21 October 1917	

=== Umbria ===
Name of system	Location	Date (from)	Date (to)	Notes
	Perugia	28 October 1943	2 November 1943	First closure occurred because vehicles were requisitioned by German authorities.
	Perugia	16 June 1946	1975	First closure occurred because vehicles were requisitioned by German authorities.

=== Veneto ===
Name of system	Location	Date (from)	Date (to)	Notes
	Padua	21 April 1937	1970	
	Venice: Lido	29 June 1941	1968	
	Venice: Mestre	25 April 1933	September 1968	System included interurban lines to Mirano, Mogliano and Treviso, and a line extending along the causeway to Santa Lucia railway station in the old city.
AMT (urban)	Verona	1937	June 1975	New system under construction (intermittently) since 2015, with new vehicles ordered in 2015. Delayed by various issues and changes to the plans, as of 2023 the system is projected to open in 2026.
APT (interurban)	Verona	15 August 1958	August 1981	System extended to Domegliara, Grezzana, Soave - San Bonifacio and Tregnago.
	Vicenza	22 October 1928	12 June 1970	A new system was planned (2010), but the project was cancelled in 2020.

Military lines:

Name of system	Location	Date (from)	Date (to)	Notes
	Asiago - Marostica	1916	1919	
	Enego - Primolano	1915	1918	

== Sardinia ==
Name of system	Location	Date (from)	Date (to)	Notes
	Cagliari	22 February 1952		System includes interurban line to Quartu Sant'Elena. See also Trolleybuses in Cagliari

== Sicily ==
Name of system	Location	Date (from)	Date (to)	Notes
	Catania	4 October 1949	27 April 1966	
	Palermo	28 October 1939	1 July 1966	
	Trapani	1952	1967	

== See also ==
- List of trolleybus systems, for all other countries
- Trolleybus usage by country
- List of town tramway systems in Italy
- List of light-rail transit systems
- List of rapid transit systems

== Sources ==
=== Books and periodicals ===
- Bruce, Ashley R. Lombard-Gerin and Inventing the Trolleybus. (2017) Trolleybooks (UK). ISBN 978-0-904235-25-8
- Murray, Alan (2000). World Trolleybus Encyclopaedia (ISBN 0-904235-18-1). Reading, Berkshire, UK: Trolleybooks.
- Gregoris, Paolo; Rizzoli, Francesco; & Serra, Claudio (2003). Giro d'Italia in filobus (ISBN 88-7785-193-7). Cortona: Editore Calosci.
- Peschkes, Robert (1993). World Gazetteer of Tram, Trolleybus and Rapid Transit Systems, Part Three: Europe (ISBN 0-948619-01-5). London: Rapid Transit Publications.
- Trolleybus Magazine (ISSN 0266-7452). National Trolleybus Association (UK). Bimonthly.
