= Trolleybuses in Rome =

Transit system int Rome, Italy

Rome trolleybus system
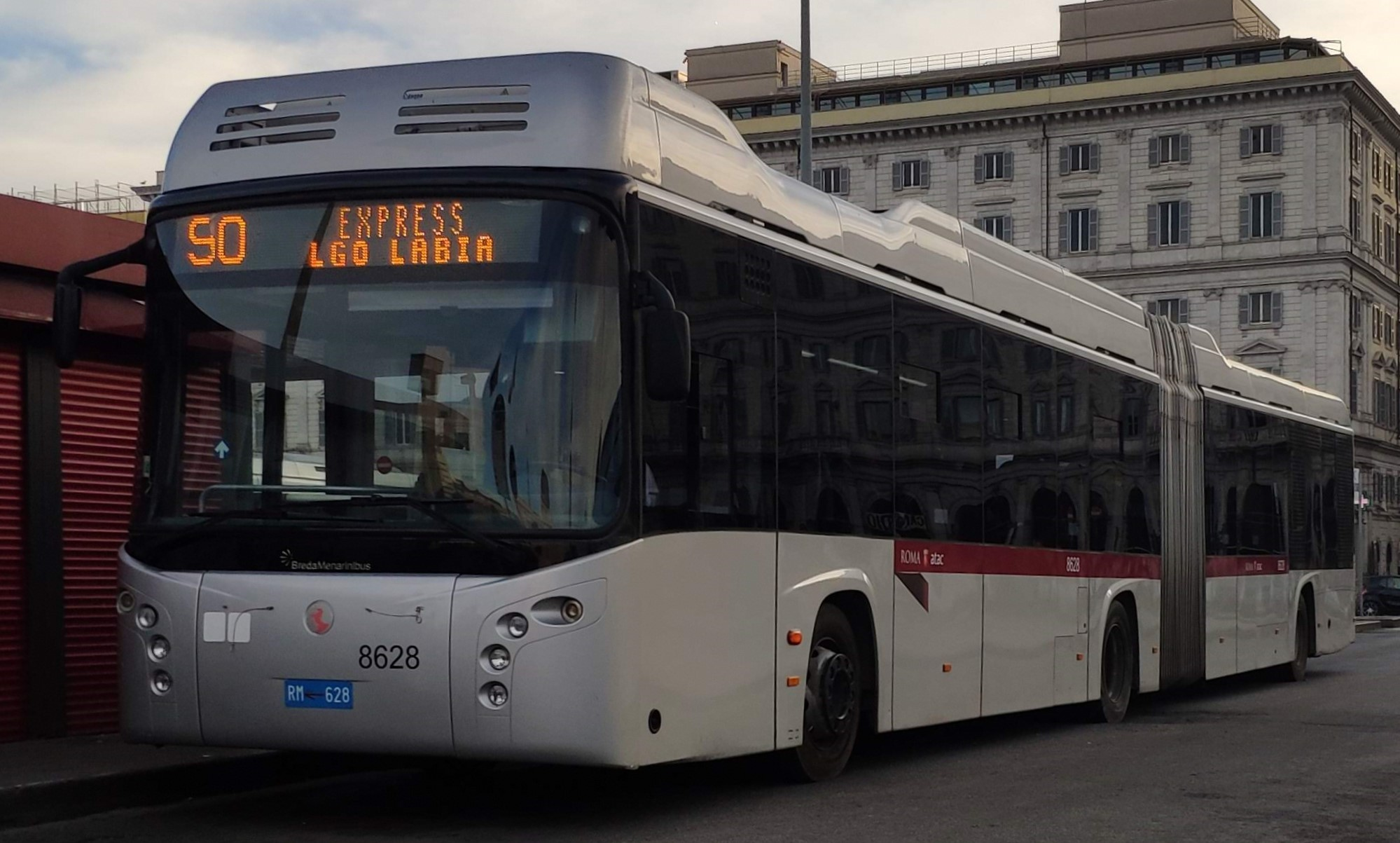
- Trolleybus line 90 at Roma Termini terminus

Operation
- Locale: Rome, Lazio, Italy

Statistics
First era: 1937–1972
- Status: Closed
- Electrification: 650 V DC parallel overhead lines (reduced to 600 V in 1964)
- Route length: 137 km (85 mi) (maximum)
Current era: since 23 March 2005
- Status: Open
- Routes: 3
- Operator: ATAC
- Electrification: 750 V DC parallel overhead lines
- Depot: 2
- Stock: 30 Solaris Trollino 18; 45 BredaMenarinibus Avancity+ HTB
- Track length (single): 16 km (9.9 mi)
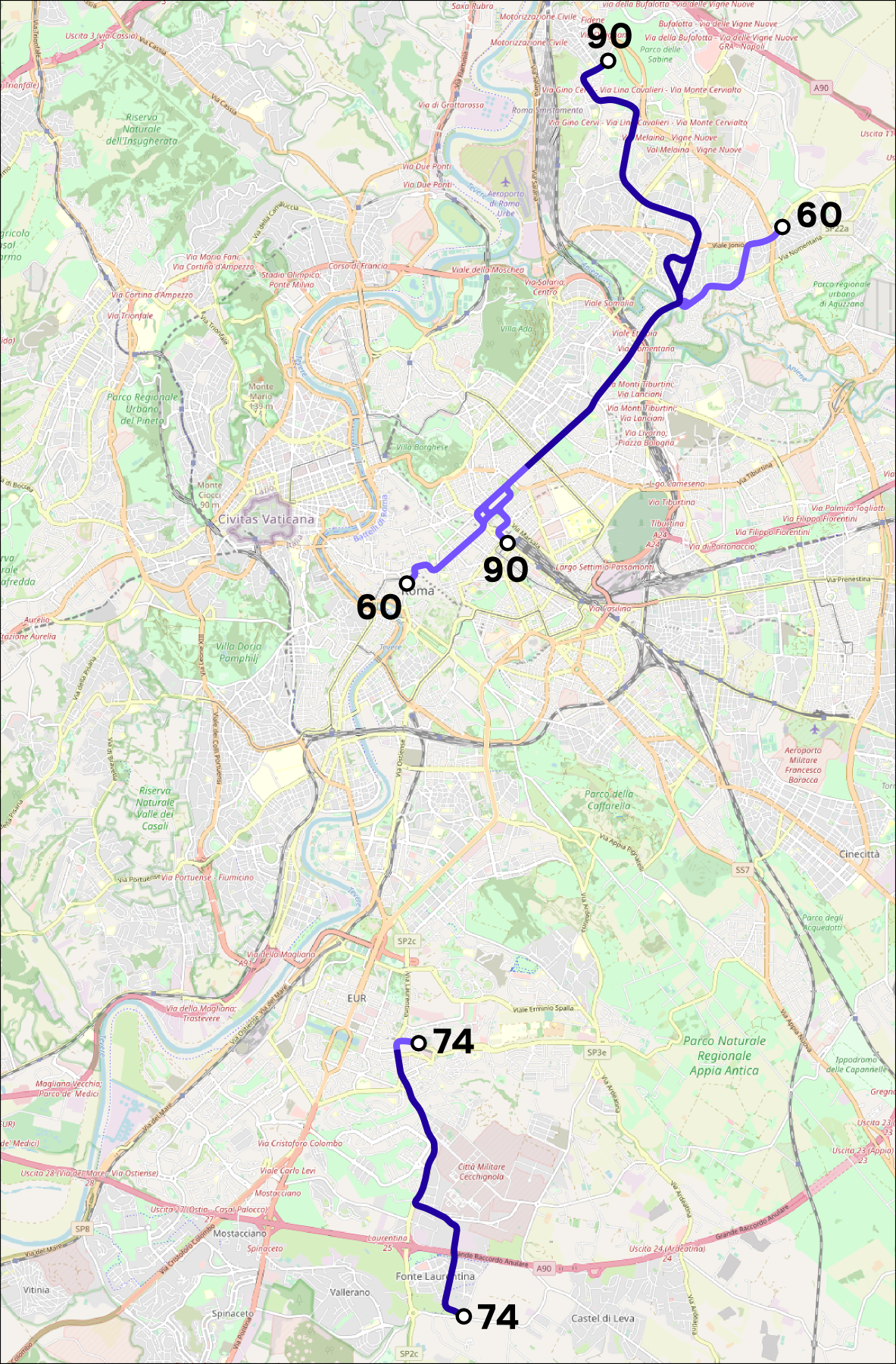
- Website: ATAC

The Rome trolleybus system (Italian: Rete filoviaria di Roma) forms part of the public transport network of the city and comune of Rome, Italy. In operation since 2005, the current system comprises three routes (60, 74 and 90).

From 1937 to 1972, Rome was served by a much more extensive trolleybus system, which was then the largest in Italy and one of the largest in Europe.

== History ==
=== The first trolleybus system (1937–1972) ===
The first route of Rome's original trolleybus system was inaugurated on 8 January 1937. In later years, the system was greatly expanded at the expense of conventional buses, which were regarded at the time as slow and uncomfortable.

Following the suspension of trolleybus services due to World War II, the system was restored and expanded during the post-war era, reaching its maximum length of 137 km in 1957. At its maximum, the fleet consisted of 424 (or 419) trolleybuses, the largest of any Italian city.

In the 1960s, the trolleybus system (as well as Rome's tram network) was considered outdated and costly to maintain. The trolleybus routes were therefore rapidly replaced by conventional buses.

On 2 July 1972, operations ceased on the last surviving trolleybus route of the original system, route 47 (Porto di Ripetta - Santa Maria della Pietà).

=== The current system (since 2005) ===
In the early 2000s, Rome's municipal administration decided to reduce car traffic and air pollution by strengthening urban public transport in central Rome, and particularly those forms of public transport powered by electric traction. The administration decided to improve the tram network (but in fact it was reduced), and by reintroducing trolleybuses on the most popular bus routes. An order for 30 Solaris trolleybuses was placed in 2000, to be low-floor, articulated, bi-mode vehicles capable of operating on batteries away from the overhead wiring for a portion of each trip. The sections of route in the city centre would not be equipped with overhead wires. Construction of the infrastructure along the first route (90) began in September 2003, while work to reequip ATAC's Montesacro depot for trolleybuses had begun in late 2002. The first trolleybus was delivered in early 2004.

On 23 March 2005, the new, second trolleybus system opened, as trolleybuses took over the operation of route 90 Express. Route 90 connected Roma Termini railway station with Largo Labia, in the city's northeast suburbs. Of the route's overall length of 11.5 km, the 1.5-km section between Stazione Termini and Porta Pia is not equipped with wiring, and is covered in battery mode. ATAC was proposing the conversion of several more express routes to trolleybuses, with route 60 next.

Plans were announced around late 2007 to construct a network of additional trolleybus routes that would be physically separate from the 2005-opened route and located in the developing southern section of the city and feeding metro line B. The plans called for 26 km of routes, of which 17 km would be equipped with overhead wiring, and 45 articulated dual-mode trolleybuses. An order was placed in 2009 with BredaMenarinibus for 45 such vehicles, fitted with Škoda electrical equipment.

Meanwhile, some changes in service on the existing, northern network were made. On 1 December 2008, the route 90-Corsa deviata (90D) Express was introduced, deviating from route 90 to terminate at Largo Pugliese instead of Largo Labia, without any overhead wires on the new section. On 18 June 2012, the Express Line 90D was discontinued, but it had already been converted to motorbuses some time earlier.

Construction of the first route of the southern network began in September 2009, and at that time, its opening was forecast for December 2011. All of the 45 articulated BredaMenarinibus trolleybuses on order had been completed by the end of 2012, but were being stored in the Czech Republic or at a Breda plant in Bologna (by 2014, all were in Bologna), as there was not yet any need for them in Rome due to delays in constructing the new routes. The first vehicle of the order was delivered in June 2015.

By March 2017, 15 of the 45 BredaMenarinibus trolleybuses had been accepted for service, and entered service on 27 March 2017. Construction of the southern network had continued to experience delays, so the new trolleybuses entered service on existing route 90 Express, along with route 60 Express – on which they introduced trolleybus service on the same date, replacing some of route 60's motorbus runs. Route 60 operates from Piazza Venezia to Largo Pugliese, and its trolleybuses share the overhead wires of route 90 between Porta Pia and Piazza Sempione along Via Nomentana. Its outer terminus, at Largo Pugliese, is the same as former route 90-deviata but with a different routing on the way. Both its section north of Piazza Sempione and its section in the city centre, between Porta Pia and Piazza Venezia, are not fitted with overhead wires and are covered in battery mode, so the conversion of route 60 to trolleybuses did not require the construction of any new wiring. Route 60 continued to be operated by a mix of trolleybuses and motorbuses.

On 8 July 2019, the first route of the southern trolleybus network, route 74, was inaugurated. It runs mostly in a dedicated corridor, in bus-only lanes, from Metro Laurentina to Fonte Laurentina (Viale Brunetti). It is 5.5 km long and has short sections at both ends that are not equipped with overhead wires, and which the trolleybuses cover in diesel mode.

In spring 2020, all of the Breda trolleybuses were taken out of service indefinitely following the expiration of a private maintenance contract for them, and the older, Solaris-built trolleybuses were also all out of service at that time, awaiting replacement of batteries, leaving all trolleybus service suspended on all three routes by June. Trolleybus service resumed on route 90 in March 2021 (initially using only Solaris vehicles). With the adoption of a new Breda maintenance contract, trolleybus service later resumed on the other two routes — route 74 in June 2022 and route 60 in May 2023. As before, on route 60 trolleybuses cover only a fraction of its runs, with motorbuses covering the majority of the route's runs. The Solaris trolleybuses operate only on route 90, while the Breda vehicles are used on all three routes.

== Services ==
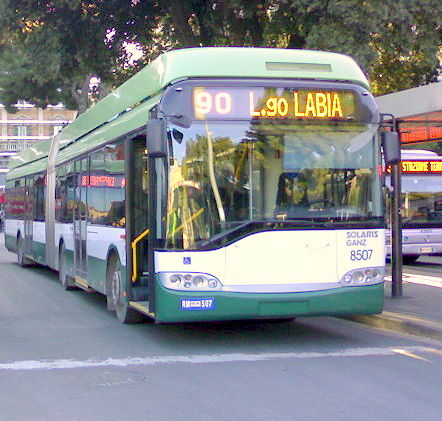
No 8507 at Roma Termini.

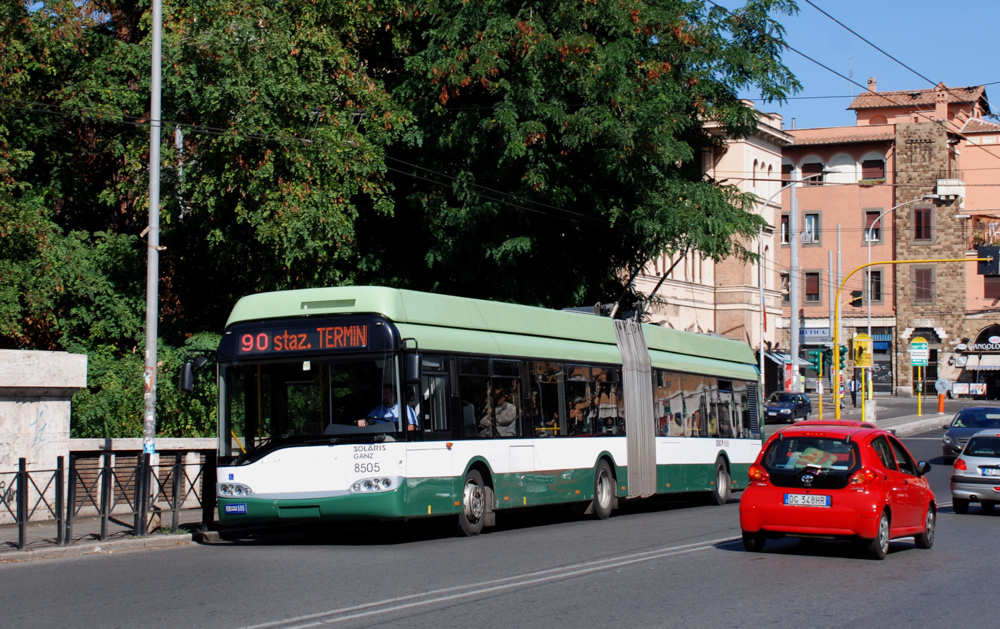
No 8505 on Via Nomentana, just south of Piazza Sempione.

- 90 Express Termini station ↔ Largo F. Labia (11.5 km (7 mi))

The section of the route from Termini station to Porta Pia is not electrified by overhead wires, as it was considered that the two-wire overhead lines would have disfigured the city centre streets. On that part of the route, the trolleybuses are powered by onboard batteries, which are automatically recharged along the sections where wires are provided.

- 60 Express Largo Pugliese ↔ Piazza Venezia (electrified only between Porta Pia and Piazza Sempione); as of 2022, it has not used any trolleybuses since spring 2020.
- 74 Metro Laurentina ↔ Fonte Laurentina (5.5 km (3 mi))

== Trolleybus fleet ==
The trolleybuses used for the operation of the present system are Solaris Trollino 18 articulated vehicles, with electrical equipment supplied by Škoda Transportation subsidiary Ganz Transelektro, with ATAC fleet numbers 8501–8530. They are 18 m (59 ft 1 in) long, 2,550 mm (8 ft 4 in) wide and 3,490 mm (11 ft 5 in) high. They are fitted with a battery system to enable operation over the non-electrified section from Termini station to Porta Pia.

In addition, 45 BredaMenarinibus Avancity+ were built in 2010–11 and delivered in 2015–17, with ATAC fleet numbers 8601–8645. They are equipped with a diesel-powered generator and electrical equipment by Škoda Transportation.

== See also ==
- Trams in Rome
- Rome Metro
- List of trolleybus systems in Italy
