= Trolleybuses in Genoa =

Public transit system in Liguria, Italy

Genoa trolleybus system
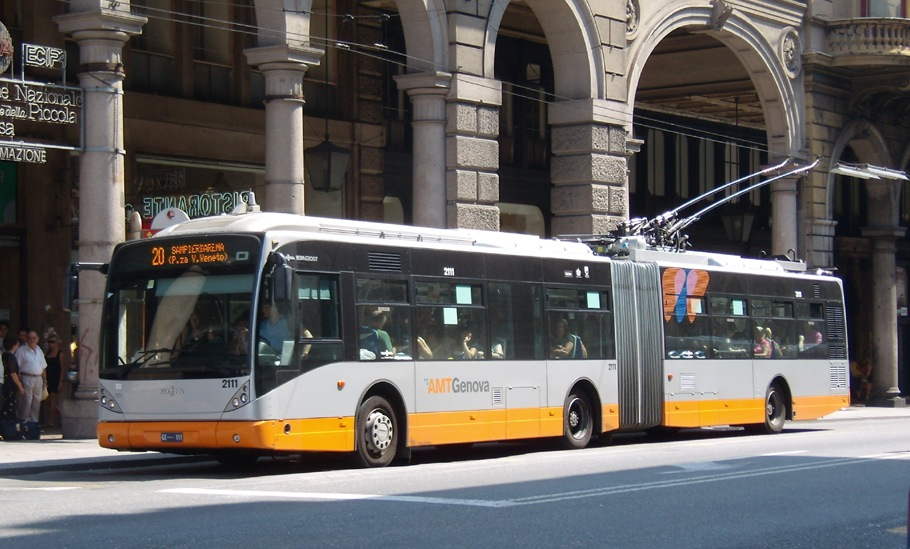
- No. 2111 on Via XX Settembre, in the city centre

Operation
- Locale: Genoa, Liguria, Italy

Statistics
First era: 1938–1973
- Status: Closed
- Routes: 8 (maximum)
- Electrification: 550 V DC parallel overhead lines
- Route length: 26.6 km (16.5 mi) (maximum)
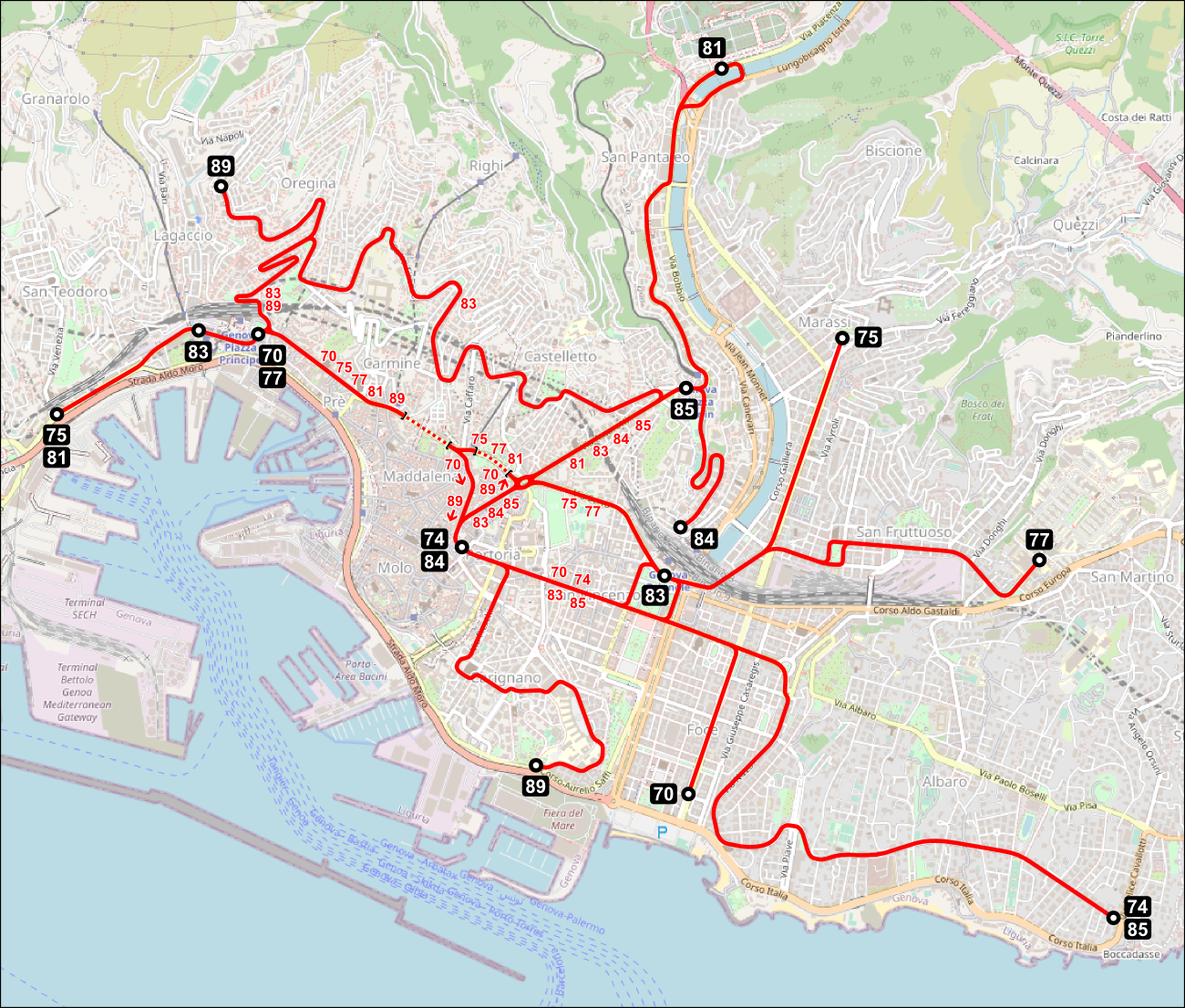
Current era: since 1997
- Status: Open
- Routes: 1
- Operator: AMT
- Electrification: 750 V DC parallel overhead lines
- Website: http://www.amt.genova.it/ AMT Genova (in Italian)

The Genoa trolleybus system (Italian: Rete filoviaria di Genova) forms part of the public transport network of the city and comune of Genoa, in the region of Liguria, northern Italy. In operation since 1997, the system currently comprises only one route. Between 2008 and 2012, two routes were being operated.

From 1938 to 1973, Genoa was served by a more extensive system, which reached a maximum length of 26.6 km (17 mi) and eight routes in 1964.

== History ==
=== The first trolleybus system (1938–73) ===
Genoa's first trolleybus system was activated on 13 April 1938, to complement the Genoa tram network and replace its steeper sections. On 30 January 1951, trolleybuses replaced trams on the important uphill bypass.

At the time of its greatest extent (1955), the first trolleybus system consisted of nine lines totalling 27 km. Its trolleybus routes served only the central areas of the city, as opposed to the tram network, which stretched across Greater Genoa.

In subsequent years, the original system was gradually reduced, by replacing the trolleybus routes with bus routes, until its total closure on 10 June 1973.

=== The current system (since 1997) ===
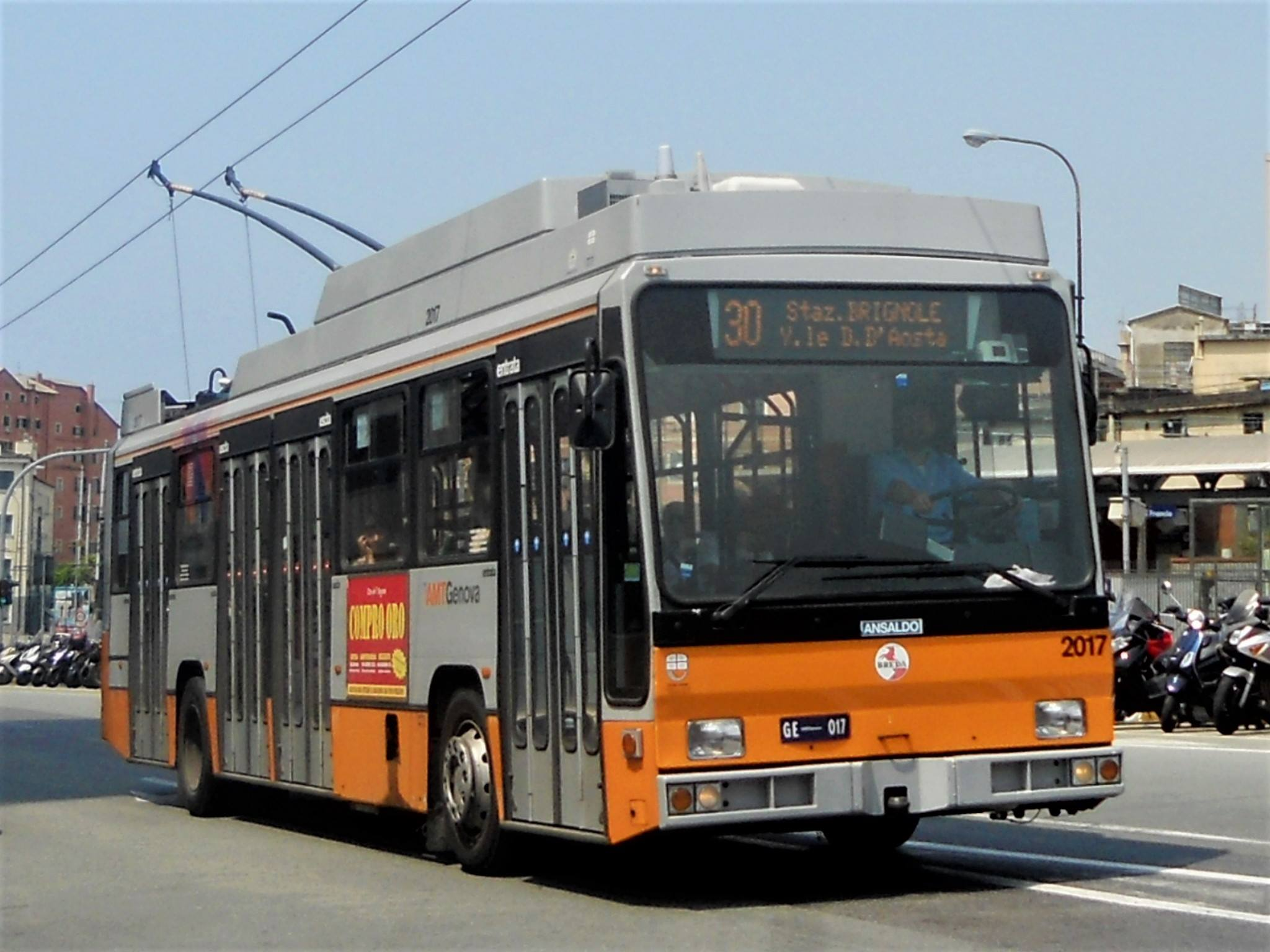
One of the two-axle Breda F15 trolleybuses that made up the original fleet of the second system

Trolleybuses were reintroduced to Genoa on 26 June 1997, when route 30 was electrified between Foce and Via di Francia. Service was operated by a newly built fleet of 20 Breda two-axle trolleybuses, of which three were available at the time of reopening with delivery and acceptance of the remaining 17 taking place gradually through 1999.

Operation of the new trolleybus system was suspended from June 2000 to December 2002, for cut-and-cover tunnel construction for the Genoa Metro at Piazza De Ferrari. Only a few months later, in May 2003, a four-year suspension of trolleybus service on the western part of the system, west of Piazza delle Fontane Marose in the city centre, began. This was a result of the conversion of Via Balbi from a two-way to a one-way street (westbound only). The latter required the permanent diversion of route 30's eastbound routing to follow Via Gramsci, and some time passed before the new eastbound routing was fitted with overhead trolley wiring. In the meantime, trolleybus service operated as route 30-barrato (Foce – Piazza delle Fontane Marose), while diesel buses served the full route 30. Trolleybus service west of the city centre was reactivated on 13 February 2007.

On 5 May 2008, an extension west from Via di Francia to Sampierdarena entered service, thereby converting route 20 (Foce – Sampierdarena) into a trolleybus route. Route 30, which had been running from Foce to Via di Francia, was curtailed at its east end, to Stazione Brignole (Brignole station), no longer running to Foce. Route 30 operated Monday to Saturday at that time, but in January 2010, its Saturday service was discontinued.

On 15 October 2012, route 30 was replaced by 30-barrata (abbreviated as "30/" at stops and on destination signs), running only between Via di Francia and Piazza Fontane Marose, no longer between the latter point and Stazione Brignole (Viale Duca D'Aosta), a route section that was mostly duplicated by route 20. Because route 30-barrata includes one turn not equipped with overhead trolley wires, it is operated by motorbuses, and consequently route 20 became the only trolleybus route still operating. Most of the two-axle (Breda) trolleybuses were withdrawn at that time, but one or two were used in unadvertised supplementary service until 22 December, when they were withdrawn, leaving only the articulated (Van Hool) vehicles in service.

== Services ==
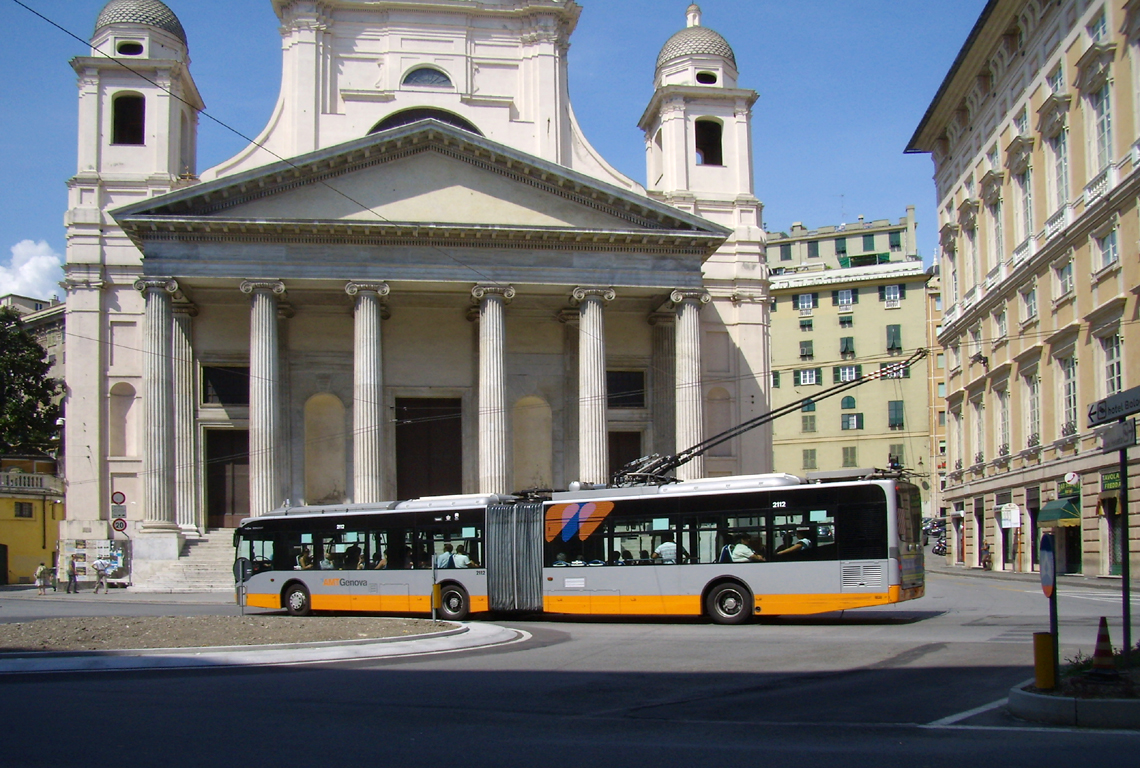
No. 2112 at Piazza della Nunziata.

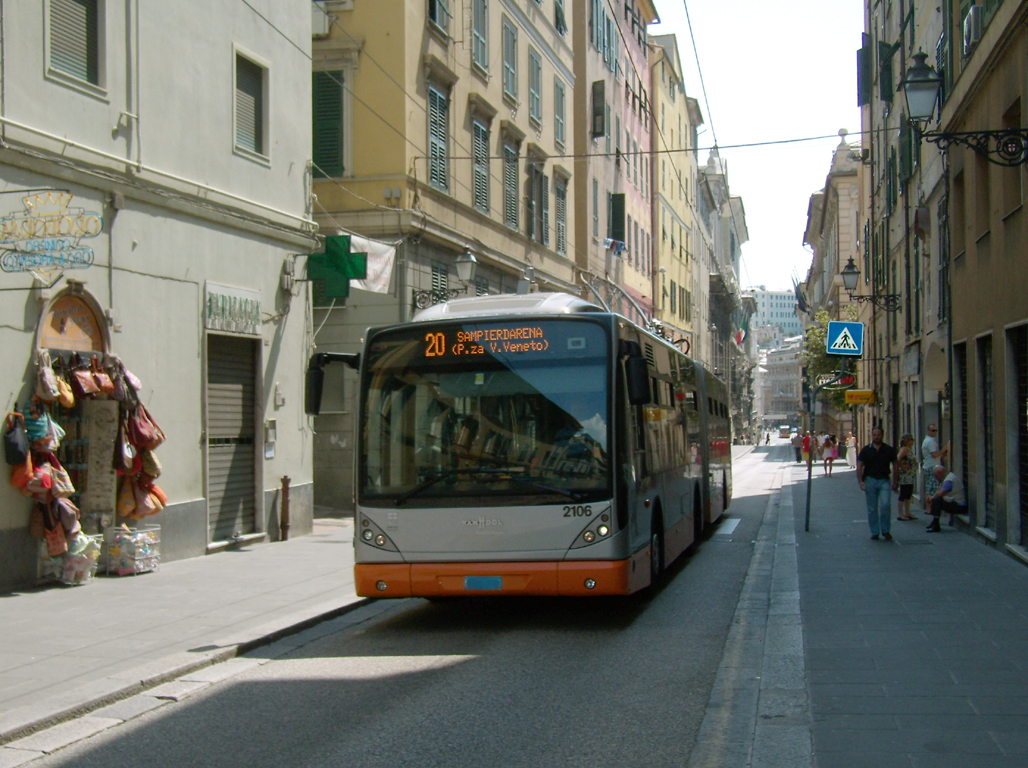
No. 2106 on Via Roma.

Since 15 October 2012, only the following route in Genoa is trolleybus-operated:

- 20 Foce (Via Rimassa) – Sampierdarena (Piazza Vittorio Veneto)

== Fleet ==
=== First system ===
The following trolleybuses were used on Genoa's first trolleybus system:

==== Two-axle vehicles ====
- Isotta Fraschini F1 (7 trolleybuses, Stanga bodies, nos. 200–207 (from 1946: 2200–2206)), served from 1938 to 1965.
- Fiat 635 F (3 trolleybuses, Varesina bodies, nos. 208–210 (from 1946: 2210)), served from 1939 to 1973.
- Alfa Romeo 500/F (3 trolleybuses, Stanga bodies, nos. 211–213 (from 1946: 2211–2213)), served from 1939 to 1956.
- SPA 34C (1 trolleybus, U.I.T.E. body, no. 199 (from 1946: 2219)), served from 1940 to 1973.
- Isotta Fraschini F2 (6 trolleybuses, Stanga bodies, nos. 214–219 (from 1946: 2214–2215; 2217–2219)), served from 1940 to 1965.
- Fiat 656 F (3 trolleybuses, Casaro bodies, nos. 220-225 (from 1946: 2220–2224)), served from 1941 to 1965.
- Fiat 668 F (50 trolleybuses, various bodies, nos. 2226–2275), served from 1950/53 to 1973; four were sold to the Chieti trolleybus system, two (nos. 2246–2247) in 1959 and two (2227, 2230) in 1963.
- Lancia Esatau (2 trolleybuses, Piaggio bodies, nos. 5001–5002), served from 1953 to 1963.

==== Three-axle rigid vehicles ====
- Breda (7 trolleybuses, Breda bodies, nos. 300-306 (from 1946: 2303–2305)), served from 1939/40 to 1963.
- Alfa Romeo 110 AF (1 trolleybus, Casaro body, no. 5176 (from 1946: 2311)), served from 1944 to 1963.
- Alfa Romeo 110 AF (5 trolleybuses, Piaggio bodies, nos. 2312–2316), served from 1948/49 to 1972.
- Fiat 672 F (15 trolleybuses, Fiat bodies, nos. 2321–2335), served from 1949/50 to 1973.
- Alfa Romeo 140 AF (15 trolleybuses, Piaggio bodies, nos. 2351–2365), served from 1949/50 to 1973.
- Alfa Romeo 140 AF (15 trolleybuses, Bagnara bodies, nos. 2366–2380), served from 1950/51 to 1973.

=== Second system ===
==== Current fleet ====
A new Solaris Trollino trolleybus in service on route 20 in 2026

Genoa's present trolleybus fleet is made up of the following type:

- Van Hool AG300T (17 articulated, low-floor trolleybuses, nos. 2101–2117); first unit entered service on 15 March 2008.

In January 2024, AMT placed an order with Solaris Bus & Coach for 112 new articulated trolleybuses, model Solaris Trollino IV 18 with In-Motion Charging capability. The first two were delivered in October 2024, and one unit (no. 2204) entered service on route 20 in May 2025. By May 2026, 42 of these vehicles had been delivered to Genova, but almost all were being kept in store, outdoors in the Campi district, not yet placed in service at that time. They began to enter service on 20 July 2026.

==== Retired fleet ====
- Breda 4001.12 F15 (20 two-axle trolleybuses, nos. 2001–2020), built 1997–98; served from 1997, when the system reopened after a 24-year closure, to 2012.

== Depots ==
The current trolleybus system has two depots (garages). Mangini depot is near Foce terminus (Rimessa AMT Mangini, Via Maddaloni 4), and Sampierdarena depot is located about 250 metres west of the terminus of that name (Rimessa AMT Sampierdarena, Via Paolo Reti). From the reopening in 1997 until 2007, only Mangini depot was used by trolleybuses, as the overhead wiring had not been extended to the Sampierdarena area. In early 2007, almost the entire trolleybus fleet was moved to Sampierdarena depot, with Mangini depot only retaining about four or five of the 1996–97 two-axle trolleybuses.

== See also ==
- Metropolitana di Genova
- List of trolleybus systems in Italy
