= Trolleybuses in Rimini =

Trolleybus system in Rimini, Italy

Coordinates: 44°03′00″N 12°34′00″E

Rimini trolleybus system
- Rete filoviaria di Rimini
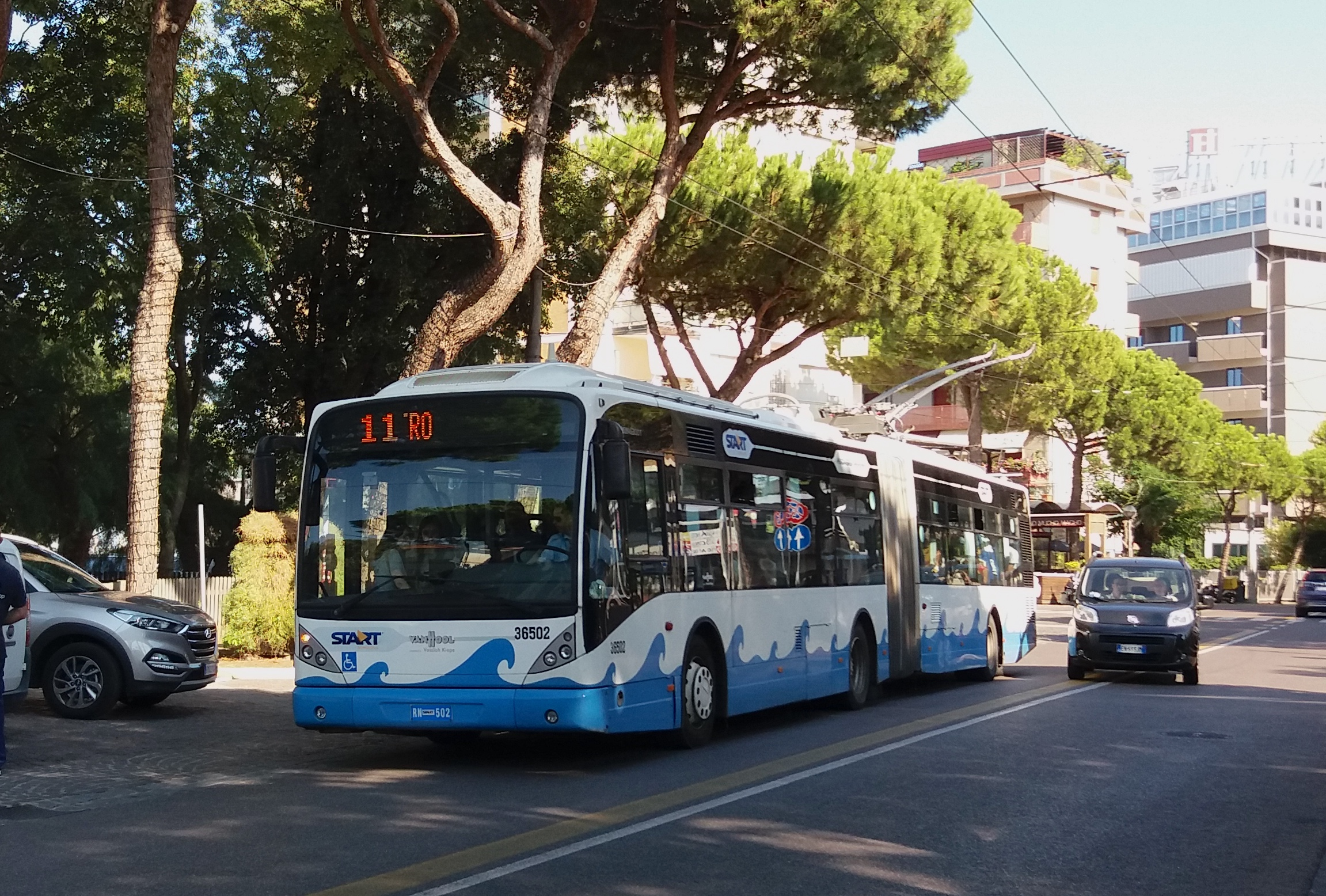
- Van Hool AG300T trolleybus 36502 in 2018

Operation
- Locale: Province of Rimini (RN), Emilia-Romagna, Italy
- Open: 1 July 1939; 87 years ago (route 11); 28 October 2021; 5 years ago (Metromare, with trolleybus service)
- Status: Operational
- Lines: Route 11 (currently operated with diesel buses); Metromare
- Owner: Patrimonio Mobilità Provincia di Rimini
- Operators: SITA (1939–1959); ATAM (1959–1992); TRAM Rimini (1992–2001); TRAM Servizi (2001–2012); Start Romagna (since 2012)

Infrastructure
- Electrification: Route 11: 600 V DC; Metromare: 750 V DC
- Depot: Viale Carlo Alberto dalla Chiesa
- Stock: 6 Van Hool AG300T (route 11); 9 Van Hool Exqui.City 18T (Metromare)

Statistics
- Route length: Total: 21 km (13 mi) • Route 11: 12.2 km (7.6 mi) • Metromare: 9.8 km (6.1 mi)
- Website: http://www.startromagna.it/ Start Romagna (in Italian)

The Rimini trolleybus system (Italian: Rete filoviaria di Rimini) forms part of the public transport network of the Province of Rimini, in the region of Emilia-Romagna, Italy.

The network consists of two trolleybus routes that connect the city centres of the coastal comuni of Rimini and Riccione. In operation since 1939 (with subsequent termini modifications), route 11 runs along the principal seafront avenue from Rimini's railway station to Riccione Terme. In November 2019, the Metromare was launched as a bus rapid transit line running entirely on segregated tracks adjacent to the Bologna–Ancona railway between the railway stations of Rimini and Riccione. Metromare was temporarily served by buses until the arrival of its trolleybuses in October 2021. Both routes are operated by Start Romagna SpA.

== History ==
=== Rimini–Riccione tramway ===
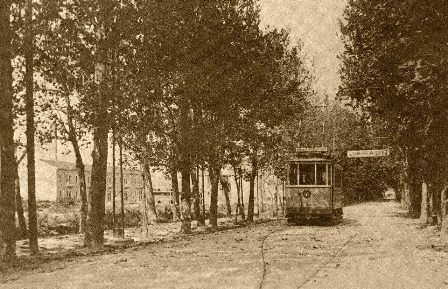
An electric tram on the road to the bathing complex, sometime between 1921 and 1939

In 1877, a horse-drawn tram service was inaugurated connecting Rimini's city centre to the coast, replacing a previous horse-drawn omnibus service from 1844. The service ran from Piazza Cavour to a bathing complex at the site of the present-day Parco Federico Fellini. In July 1921, with a loan of 1.2 million lire from the local Cassa di Risparmio, the route was electrified and extended southwards along the principal seafront avenue to the site of the present-day Piazza Marvelli.

Further southern extensions followed to Miramare in 1925, and to Viale Ceccarini in Riccione's city centre on 26 June 1927, only now made possible by newly built carriageable bridges over the Torrente Marano and Rio Melo. Entering Riccione, the trolleybuses left the principal seafront avenue at Viale Giuseppe Verdi, and entered the city centre along Viale Dante, the next road inland parallel to the coast. The tramway became a popular tourist attraction.

From July 1921 until April 1923, the municipal council managed the service; it then passed into the management of Società RATE until April 1926, when it was replaced by the Società Tramvie Elettriche.

=== Conversion to trolleybuses ===
In the 1930s, it was decided to convert the tramway into a trolleybus line, supported by the fascist government's promulgation of trolleybuses. The line was constructed by Compagnia Generale di Elettricità, and its management was entrusted to SITA of Florence until 1959. Tram services ceased on 15 January 1939.

The trolleybus line opened on 1 July 1939. The route had new termini: in Rimini, the central Piazza Giulio Cesare (renamed Piazza Tre Martiri in 1946); and in Riccione, Piazzale dei Giardini. Riccione's terminus was reconfigured shortly after its construction to bring trolleybuses to terminate on the piazzale's mountain-facing side, thereby avoiding trolleybuses passing near the seaside Villa Mussolini and disturbing guests. The route was served by an initial fleet of two Fiat 635E and eight 656E CGE trolleybuses. The 635E trolleybuses were used for reinforcement runs between Piazza Giulio Cesare and Marina Centro.

The overhead wiring was removed during the Second World War, during which time bombing damaged the roads and directly hit two trolleybuses. Services were initially amended to allow trolleybuses to run on unaffected sections, but the line was finally closed on 26 June 1944. Following the war's conclusion, service was progressively reactivated in sections between July and August 1946. A fleet of new Fiat 2401 Cansa CGE trolleybuses entered service in 1954. Fares were collected by a seated conductor.

=== ATAM and route 10 ===
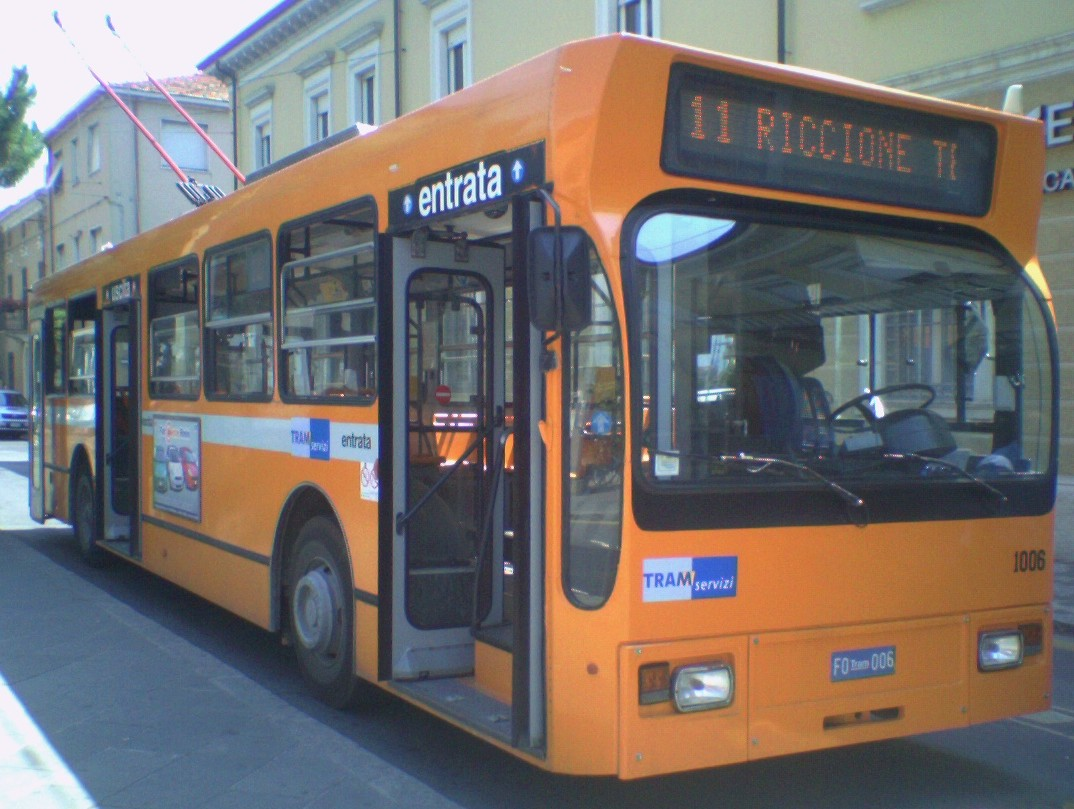
One of the Volvo/Mauri trolleybuses that served the system from 1977 to 2009

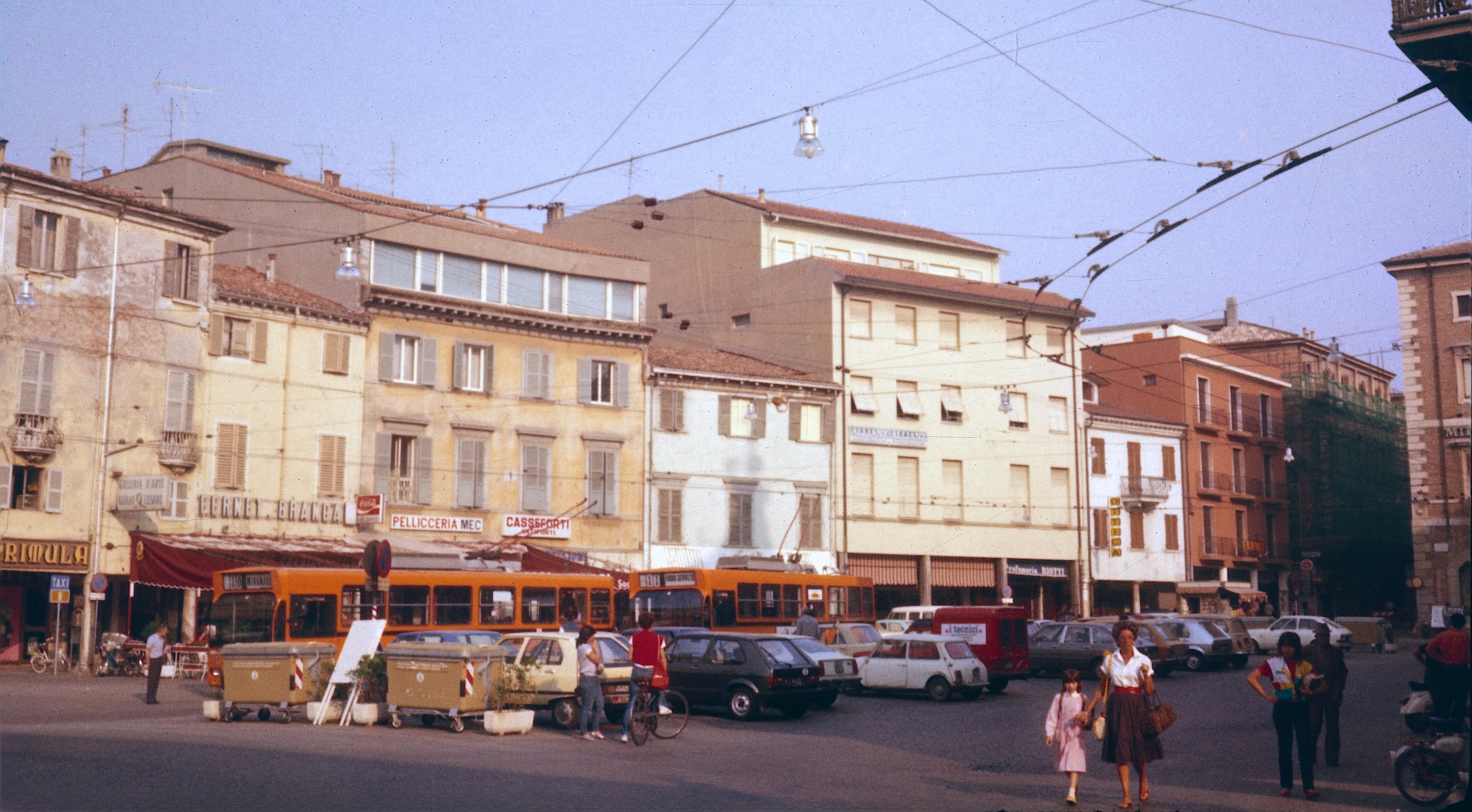
Trolleybuses on routes 10 and 11 at the Piazza Tre Martiri terminus in 1982

After its twenty years had passed, Rimini's communist mayor decided not to renew SITA's contract. Thus, numbered as route 11, the system passed into the control of Rimini's municipal council on 1 October 1959, which formed ATAM (Azienda Trasporti Autofiloviari Municipali) to manage the line in July 1960. In 1968, eight Alfa Romeo CGE Casaro 910AF45 trolleybuses entered service, and the fleet was renewed again between 1976 and 1979 with 17 Mauri-bodied Volvo B59 vehicles, carrying fleet numbers 1001–1017. The use of on-board conductors to collect fares continued, and in the new vehicles the conductor's seat was located across from the centre door, through which all boarding took place.

Notably, Rimini's trolleybus system weathered the decline in public transport demand during the 1960s with the advent of affordable private transportation. City planners interpreted the 1973 oil crisis as proof that ecosustainable public transport was still necessary. After some deliberation, in 1975, it was decided not to decommission the system; in the same year, the trolleybuses changed colour from green to orange.

Under ATAM's management, a shortworking service covering only the Rimini–Miramare part of the line was numbered as route 10. The trolleybus system thus had two routes, but one was only a shortworking of the longer route, with no wiring of its own except for the terminal loop at Miramare. The service was withdrawn in 1996, but the reversing loop in the overhead wires that allowed trolleybuses to terminate there was retained, and rare shortworkings to Miramare were designated "11/" (11-barrata). (Note: As of 2023, START Romagna SpA operates a route 10 motorbus between Rimini Fiera and Miramare, which follows the route of the old trolleybus route 10 (and the present route 11) from Viale Principe Amedeo to Miramare. The route is only in service during exhibition days at the Fiera.) In 2003, the turning loop was replaced by wiring along a newly constructed roundabout to allow trolleybuses to continue terminating at Miramare.

In 1985, the line was rerouted in Riccione along the principal seafront avenue rather than Viale Dante. The following year, the prohibition of motorbuses in Piazza Tre Martiri left only the route 11 trolleybus serving Rimini's central square. In the late 1980s, the use of conductors was phased out, with ticket machines installed on board the trolleybuses.

In 1992, ATAM was renamed TRAM (Trasporti Riuniti Area Metropolitana). In 2001, its name was modified again to TRAM Servizi, and ownership of the infrastructure passed to Patrimonio Mobilità Provincia di Rimini (PMR).

=== Late-1990s termini modifications ===
In 1994, a short extension in Riccione moved the terminus from Piazzale Giardini to a new bus station at Piazza Eugenio Curiel. The new terminus was referred to as "Giardini C.".

In October 1999, the route was temporarily shortened from Piazza Curiel to Piazzale Giardini, but the terminal loop at the latter point was configured differently than it had been previously. This loop was used by trolleybuses for only 12 days in October 1999 and then from March or April 2000 to mid-June, with buses working the route in the interim. Trolleybus services to Piazza Curiel resumed on 21 July 2000.

Until 1 November 1998, the Rimini terminus of line 11 was in the central Piazza Tre Martiri. Following the pedestrianisation of the piazza, from 2 November 1998, the route was shortened by 400 metres (1,300 ft) to Piazzale San Girolamo on Via Dante Alighieri. However, all trolleybus services were suspended for several months due to road construction. The first day of service to the new "Rimini (San Girolamo)" terminus was 11 June 1999.

Construction of a 1.5 km-long (0.93 mi) southern extension from Piazza Curiel to Riccione's Terme, specifically Piazzale Marinai d'Italia, began in spring 2000. The extension of service to Terme opened on 11 June 2000, but not for trolleybuses, as the route again became temporarily bus-operated while work continued on the extension wiring and restoring the connecting wires of the Piazza Curiel loop. Trolleybus service to Piazza Curiel resumed on 21 July 2000, on short-workings, and through services to Riccione Terme became trolleybus-operated from 1 August 2001, bringing into use the new section of wiring. From June 2000, trips limited to Piazzale Curiel had been redesignated as "11/" (11-barrata). The shortworking terminus continued to be referred to as "Giardini C." on maps, at stops, and on vehicle destination signs.

=== Fleet renewal ===
In 2008, an order was placed for five Van Hool AG300T trolleybuses, the system's first articulated vehicles, to replace the Volvo/Mauri trolleybuses that were by then around 30 years old and were the oldest trolleybuses still in service in Western Europe. The first unit was delivered in June 2009. An additional unit was later purchased and delivered in 2011. The series was originally numbered 6501–6506.

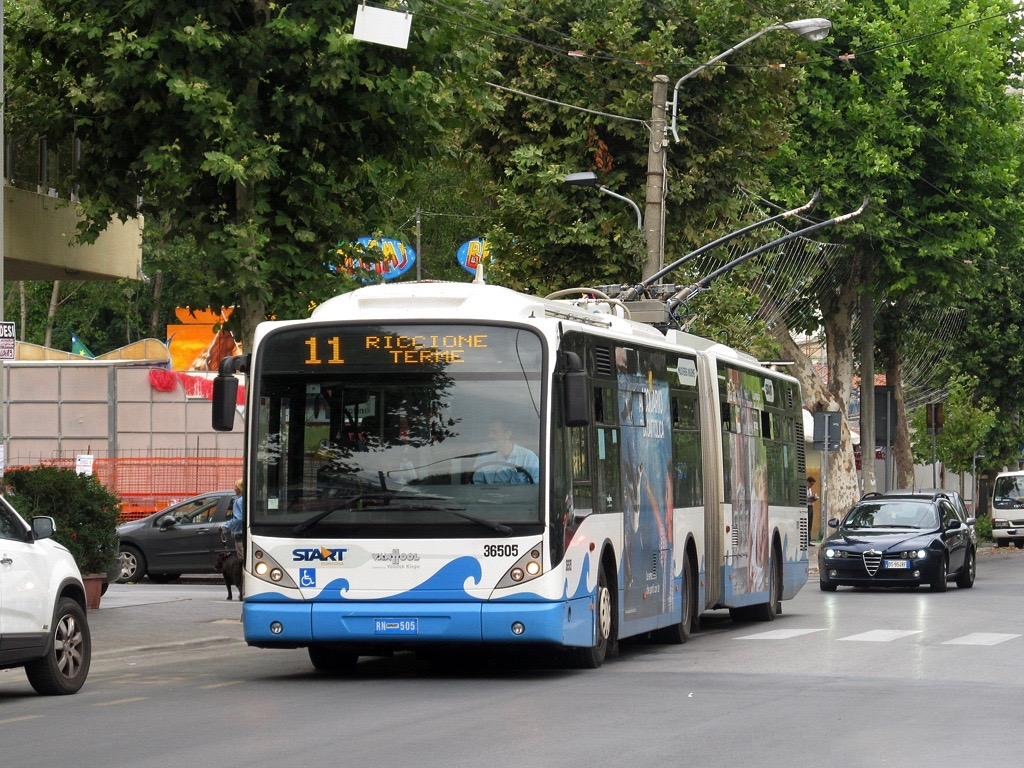
A Van Hool AG300T trolleybus outbound on route 11 in 2015

After the end of the day's service on 14 September 2009, the Volvo B59 Mauri trolleybuses were taken out of service, as the Italian regulatory authority USTIF had revoked their authorisations. From the following day, the trolleybus route again became temporarily operated by diesel buses because new Van Hool AG300T articulated trolleybuses had not yet been certified by USTIF and the overhead wiring through the low underpass carrying the line under the railway in Rimini required modifications for the new vehicles. Because the articulated motorbuses were unable to perform the U-turn in the tight space of Piazzale San Girolamo, the route was extended along Via Aponia to the nearby Piazzale Gramsci.

The new Van Hool articulated trolleybuses entered service on 3 June 2010. Because the overhead wire was not extended to Piazzale Gramsci, the articulated vehicles had to cover that short section using their auxiliary diesel engines. On 1 June 2011, the route was shortened back to Via Dante but using a different routing to avoid the tight U-turn at Piazzale San Girolamo.

=== Start Romagna ===
On 1 January 2012, TRAM was absorbed by Start Romagna SpA, a then-new regional entity which would manage public transport within three provinces. Upon Start Romagna's creation, the fleet was renumbered with the addition of a prefix "3", becoming 36501–36506.

=== Metromare ===
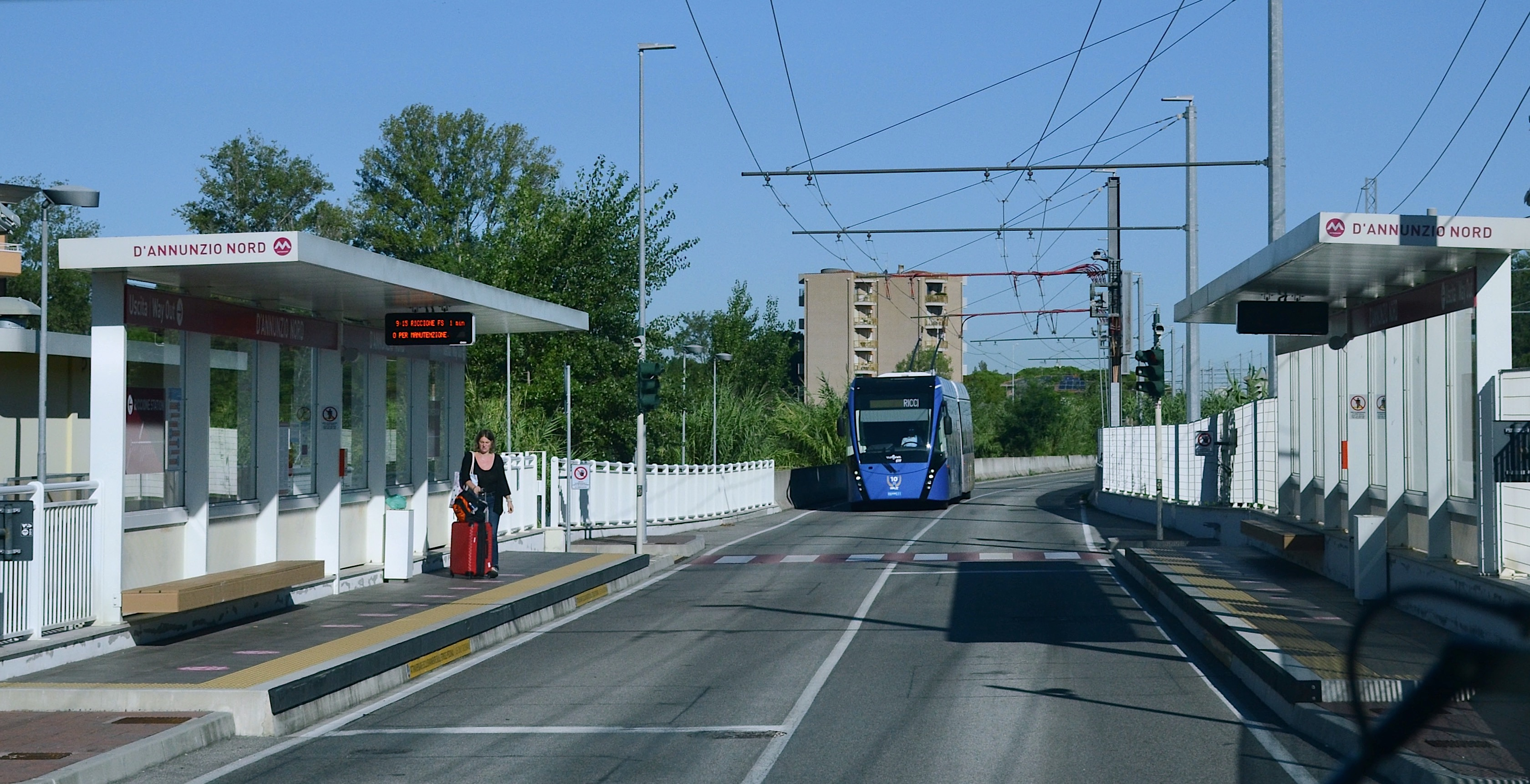
A station on the Metromare with a trolleybus approaching, 2022

In July 2012, construction started on a 9.8-kilometre (6.1 mi) trolleybus rapid transit line to run adjacent to the Bologna–Ancona railway between the railway stations of Rimini and Riccione. The project was first proposed in 1994 by city planner Leonardo Benevolo, but construction was continually postponed amid local opposition and a delay to the disbursement of central government financing. The contracts for engineering and constructing the line were signed in 2008.

From its inception until February 2018, the project was known as Trasporto Rapido Costiero (TRC) (Coastal Rapid Transport). The major impetus for the project was that heavy traffic congestion along the streets used by the route 11 during the summer touristic season led trolleybuses to take up to an hour to complete the route. At its inception, it was planned that Metromare would replace route 11 once opened, but in 2008 Trolleybus Magazine reported that it had been decided "to postpone any consideration of closing the existing trolleybus line until after the new segregated route has commenced operation." Metromare was originally planned to use guided trolleybuses, but automated guidance was later dropped.

In 2017, PMR ordered nine Van Hool Exqui.City 18T articulated trolleybuses to run on Metromare. After the fleet's delivery was delayed, the coordination committee decided to launch Metromare provisionally on 23 November 2019 with motorbuses. Following an additional delay caused by the COVID-19 pandemic, the first trolleybus arrived on 12 June 2020, and all nine had been delivered by February 2021. Testing began in July 2020 and the vehicles were approved in September 2021, entering service on 28 October 2021.

Planning is underway for a 4.2-kilometre (2.6 mi) northern extension of the Metromare from the railway station to Rimini Fiera. The route will run alongside the Bologna-Ancona railway, with six intermediate stops. The works contract is due to be awarded in December 2023, with construction starting in the summer of 2024. The extension is expected to be completed by 2026. The third stage of the Metromare is expected to be a southern extension to Misano and Cattolica.

== Route descriptions ==
Both route 11 and Metromare are integrated into Start Romagna's local bus network, and tickets can be used interchangeably with local buses. Tickets can be purchased on board at surcharge, at the route terminals, or in local convenience shops and dedicated vendors. As both are shoreline routes, they cover two fare zones, Rimini and Riccione, with an intermediate neutral zone in Miramare. Tickets are available for travel within either fare zone or across both fare zones.

Map of route 11 as of August 2013

=== Route 11 ===
Route 11 runs entirely on roads shared with other vehicles. Starting at Via Dante Alghieri, the route serves Rimini's railway station before passing underneath the Bologna-Ancona railway next to the Porto Canale. This underpass is a critical point in the line: it has a tight bend and limited overhead clearance, forcing the trolleybuses to flatten their trolley poles near their roofs, with the risk that the trolley poles will come off the wires. The route runs along Viale Principe Amedeo to reach the coastline, serving Parco Federico Fellini. The route then runs southwards along the principal seafront avenue, (Note: The name of the principal seafront avenue changes along the coastline: Viale Amerigo Vespucci in Marina Centro, then Viale Regina Elena until Bellariva, then Viale Regina Margherita until Miramare, then Viale Principe di Piemonte until Riccione, then Viale Gabriele d'Annunzio until the Rio Melo, then Viale Milano, and finally Viale Torino for the last 200 m (660 ft) before Riccione Terme.) serving Rimini's frazioni of Bellariva, Rivazzurra, and Miramare. It leaves Rimini's fare zone after the Viale Gubbio stop in Miramare, and enters Riccione's fare zone from the Viale Angeloni stop by Piazzale Allende in the comune of Riccione. It crosses the Torrente Marano and Rio Melo rivers before reaching Piazzale Curiel, where it interchanges with several local bus routes and route 125, which runs between Piazzale Curiel and Cattolica via Misano. Route 11 terminates five stops later at Terme.

For most of the route, the overhead wires are a floating type, with Swiss-style articulated hangers to eliminate kickback movement. Between Piazzale Curiel and Riccione Terme, the overhead wire is of a rigid type cable. There is also an automated exchange with infrared remote control at Piazzale Curiel.

The line is supplied with current by four substations: Centro (formerly a depot), Bellariva, Riccione Alba and Riccione Abissinia. In the past, all substations serving route 11 (excluding the new Riccione Abissinia) were equipped with mercury-vapor rectifiers, which were housed in buildings with a central chimney to assist with cooling. The substations are now all equipped with solid state low-thermal-output transformers.

As of 2025 route 11 is operated with diesel buses instead of trolleybuses. The overhead wires have been interrupted in places due to construction works.

=== Metromare ===
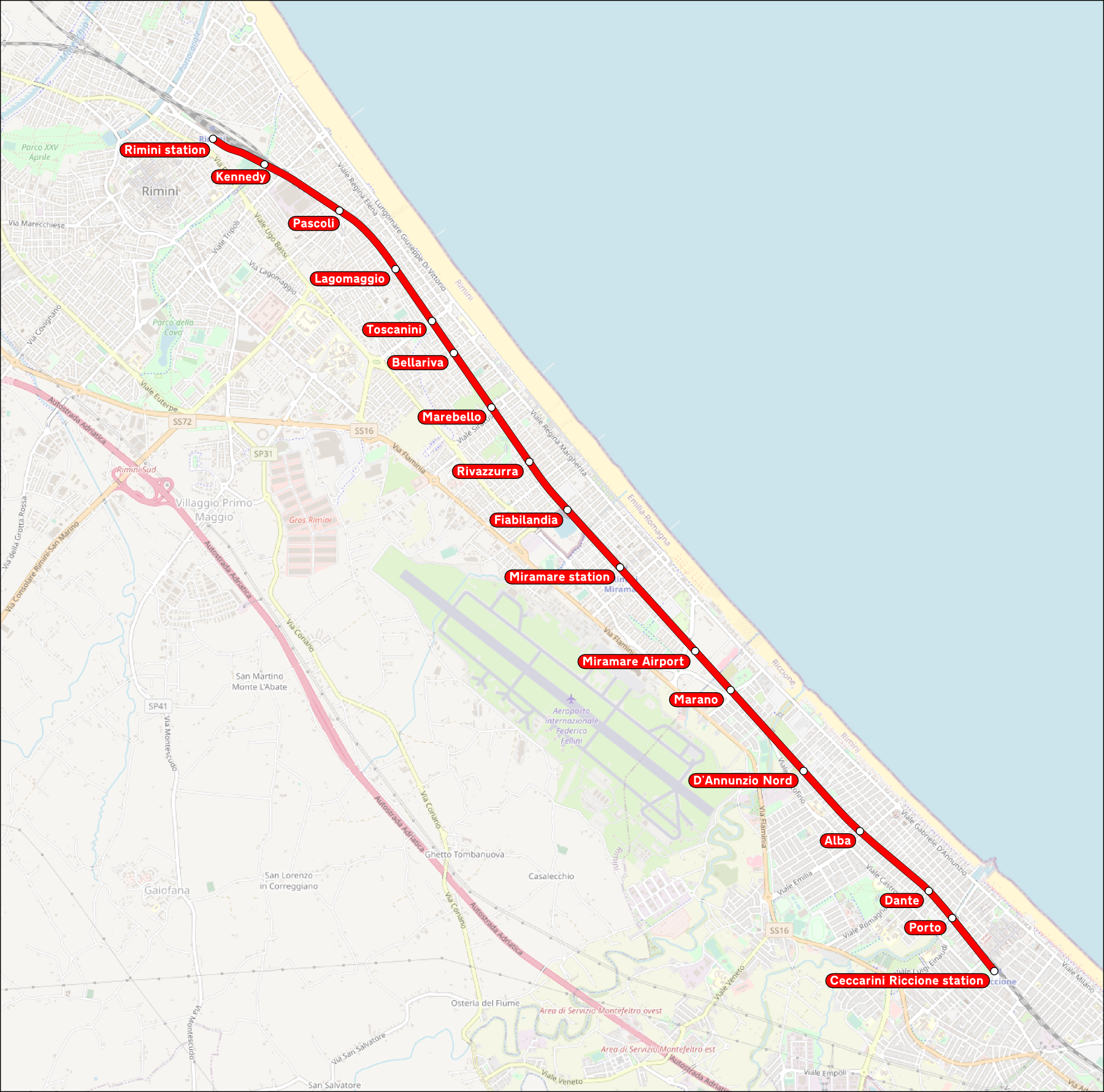
Map of Metromare

Metromare services run on a 9.8-kilometre (6.1 mi) long track entirely segregated from outside traffic and adjacent to the Bologna-Ancona railway between the railway stations of Rimini and Riccione. The route contains seventeen stations, counting the two termini. Intermediate stops serve the Fiabilandia amusement park in Rivazzurra, Miramare's railway station, and Federico Fellini International Airport.

Just beyond the Riccione terminus, Metromare vehicles briefly leave the busway to turn around via a small roundabout in front of the railway station; this is the only place where the route's trolleybuses run along public streets during the service day, but they do not carry passengers during this manoeuvre. 59 percent of the route has only a single bi-directional lane while the remainder has two lanes, but there are two sets of overhead trolley wires – one for each direction – along the entire line. The roadway is only one lane wide at Lagomaggio station but is two lanes wide at all other stations.

The only intermediate turning loop on the entire route that is equipped with overhead wires is located immediately southeast of Miramare Airport station, but there is also a turning loop without overhead wires at one other intermediate station, Toscanini.

== Trolleybus fleet ==
=== Current fleet ===
Current trolleybus fleet
Builder/Model	Route	Image	Length (metres)	Capacity			Quantity	Fleet numbers	Built	Entered service	Notes
Builder/Model	Route	Image	Length (metres)	Std	Sdg	Total	Quantity	Fleet numbers	Built	Entered service	Notes
Van Hool AG300T	Route 11 only		18.0	45	100	145	6	36501–36506	2009–2011	June 2010	Numbered 6501–6506 until Start Romagna's debut in 2012. Fitted with Vossloh Kiepe electrical equipment.
Van Hool ExquiCity 18T	Metromare only		18.6	37	110	147	9	36511–36519	2020	October 2021	In summer, six are in use at any one time, with three spare. (The remainder of the year, four are in use.) The trolleybuses are fitted with Kiepe electrical equipment.

When necessary, service on the route 11 is supplemented by articulated motorbuses.

=== Former fleet ===
Former trolleybus fleet
Manufacturer and model	Length (metres)	Capacity			Quantity	Fleet numbers	Years operated	Notes
Manufacturer and model	Length (metres)	Std	Sdg	Total	Quantity	Fleet numbers	Years operated	Notes
Fiat 635E	8.5	20	33	53	2	1005–1006	1939–1971	Used for reinforcement runs between Piazza Giulio Cesare and Marina Centro. Unit 1005 required restoration after the war.
Fiat 656E CGE	10.0	24	46	70	8	1001–1004, 1007–1010	1939–1971	Units 1009 and 1010 required restoration after the war.
Fiat 2401 Cansa CGE	10.4	20	58	80	4	1011–1015	1954–1978	
Fiat CGE Menarini 2411F	11.0	22	63	87	1	1041	1964–1978	
Alfa Romeo CGE Casaro 910AF45	10.5	19	58	77	8	1002–1003, 1005–1006, 1009–1010, 1042–1043	1968–1978	
Mauri Volvo B59	12.0	29	70	99	17	1001–1017	1976–2009	

Unit 1017 (built 1978) of the Mauri Volvo B59 has been preserved and restored by Enrico Fabbri, a transport engineer and former director of ATAM Rimini. In July 2018, on the occasion of the Mauri trolleybuses' 40th birthday, members of the public were invited for the first time to view the restored trolleybus. The event took place at Fabbri's company, Vulcangas, in Poggio Torriana.

== Depots ==
The system has only one depot, on Viale Carlo Alberto della Chiesa, opened in 1982, which services the trolleybuses of both route 11 and the Metromare. Trolleybuses must use their auxiliary batteries to travel between it and the routes, because the depot is not connected to either route with overhead wiring.

From 1912 until 1982, the trolleybuses used a depot on Viale Baldini, off Via Principe Amedeo. The former site contains one of the extant substations used by route 11 trolleybuses.

== Incidents ==
Several pickpocketers have been arrested after targeting tourists on route 11 trolleybuses, especially during the summer touristic season.

On 17 August 2015, a man escaped after attempting to molest a child on a route 11 trolleybus in Miramare. On 20 August 2021, a 43-year-old man was arrested for sexual assault after stripping naked in front of a female passenger on a route 11 trolleybus on Viale Regina Elena.

On 10 September 2021, a 26-year-old Somali citizen stabbed two female ticket inspectors with a kitchen knife during an inspection on the route 11 outside Rimini Terme. In the ensuing escape, the attacker stabbed three other people on the street, including a six-year-old boy. He boarded a Metromare service, and was apprehended by police near Piazzale Pascoli after running along the railway tracks. The boy was reported to be seriously injured and required carotid surgery on his throat. The attack prompted reaction from national politicians, including the Interior Minister Luciana Lamorgese and opposition party leader Matteo Salvini. In December 2022, the Court of Rimini acquitted the attacker on grounds of his schizophrenia and ordered him to stay at a secure mental health facility (REMS) for six years.

== See also ==
- Rimini railway station
- List of trolleybus systems in Italy
