= Rolling stock of Società Veneta =

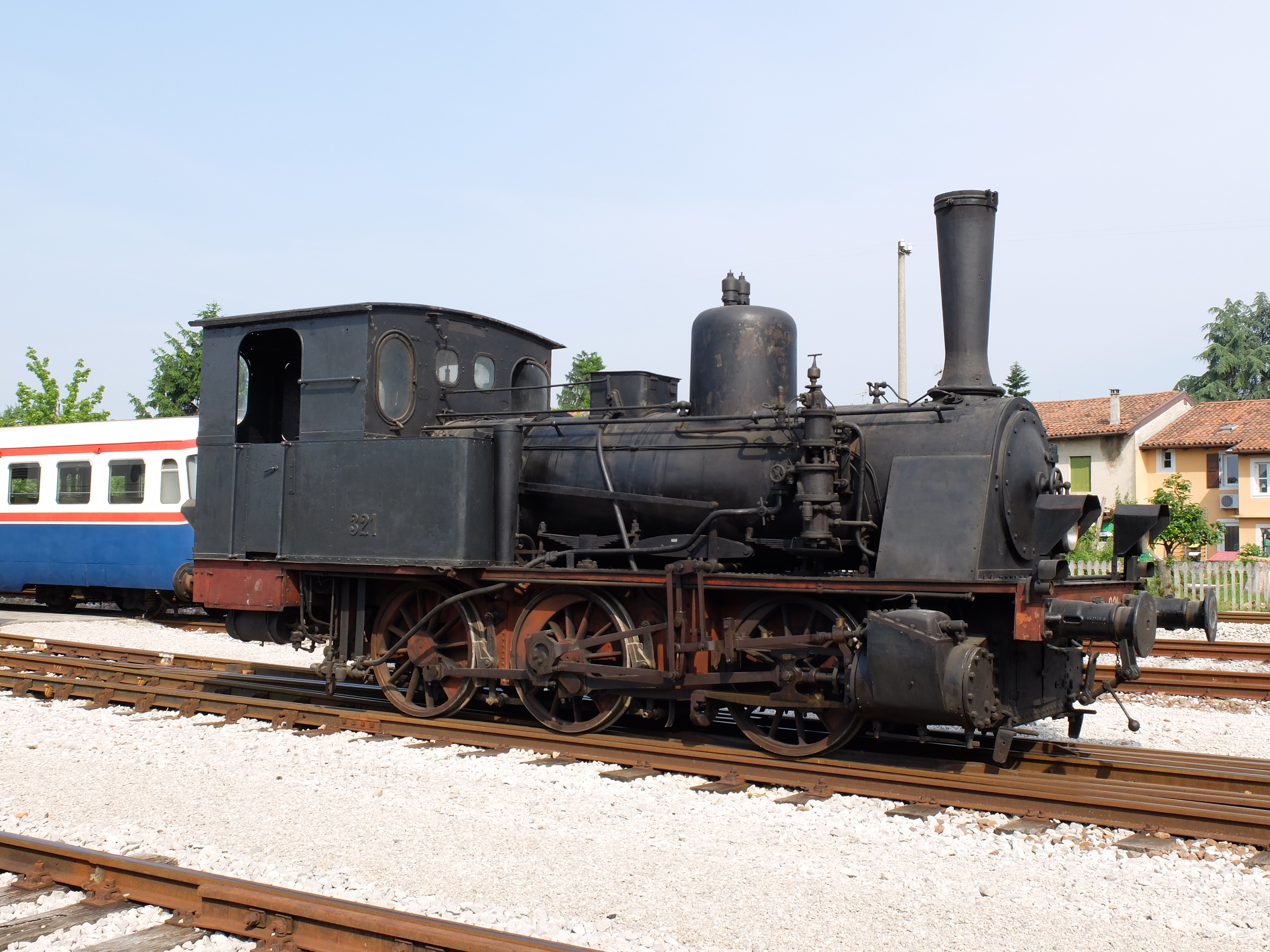
Societa Veneta T3 type no. 321 (formerly 102) at Udine in 2016

This article lists rolling stock of Società Veneta. It is not complete.

== Steam locomotives ==
Railway locomotives with separate tender - Ordinary gauge
Notation	Year	Builder	Running Gear	Notes
501	1849	Stephenson	C	ex SFR, for construction site trains
1 ÷ 9	1876	Esslingen	1B	in 1906 they moved to the FS (group 155)

Railway locomotives - Ordinary gauge
Notation		Year	Builder	Running gear	Notes
Until 1915	From 1915 onwards	Year	Builder	Running gear	Notes
31 ÷ 32	–	1877	Esslingen	C	in 1906 they moved to the FS (group 848)
81 ÷ 82	–	1905	Maffei	C	in 1906 they moved to the FS (group 849)
4	20	1889	Krauss	B	ex FVCG 4, moved to SV in 1910
1 ÷ 3, 5 ÷ 7	21	1888, 1906	Henschel	B	ex FVCG 1 ÷ 3, 5 ÷ 7, moved to SV in 1910
41 ÷ 49	22	1878-1886	Esslingen	B1	In 1937 some moved to FS (groups 818 e 819)
50 ÷ 57	23	1887-1889	Esslingen, Breda	B1	In 1937 one unit moved to FS (gruppo 820)
1 ÷ 5	24	1883	Henschel	B1	ex FPS 1 ÷ 5, moved to SV in 1885
241 ÷ 243	25	1888	Breda	1B
21 ÷ 26	26	1877-1878	Esslingen	B1	in 1906 two units moved to FS (group 802); in 1937 ann unit moved to FS (group 811)
61 ÷ 66	27	1902-1903	Henschel	1B
81 ÷ 84	28	1909	Koppel	1B
1	29	1907	Koppel	C	ex SIFV 1, moved to SV in 1912
151 ÷ 155	30	1906-1909	Henschel	C	Prussian tipe T 3
–	31	1915	Breda	C	Prussian tipe T 3
101 ÷ 109	32	1906-1909	Henschel	C	Prussian tipe T 3
121	33	1907	Borsig	C
5 ÷ 7	34	1910-1911	Henschel	C	Twins of the SAO 1 ÷ 4
–	35	1892-1896	SLM	1'C	ex BLS Ec 3/4 21 ÷ 25
–	36	1902-1903	SLM	1'C	ex Seetalbahn Ed 3/4 12 e 14
–	37	1878	SLM	1'C	ex FFS 7495 ÷ 7499
–	38	1882	Krauss	2'B	ex FFS 5425 ÷ 5430
–	39	1881-1888	Esslingen, SLM	2'B	ex FFS 5441 ÷ 5466

Railway locomotives - Narrow gauge
Notation		Year	Costruttore	Rodiggio	Gauge	Notes
Until 1915	from 1915 onwards	Year	Costruttore	Rodiggio	Gauge	Notes
90 ÷ 99	9	1915	Breda	B	750 mm
–	2104	1911	Koppel	B	750 mm
–	2119	1886	SLM	B	750 mm
–	2122 ÷ 2125	1910-1913	Koppel	B	750 mm
–	42 ÷ 56	1916-1918	Reggiane	B	750 mm
1 ÷ 3	1 ÷ 3	1890	Krauss	B	800 mm	Construction site train
1	1	1909	Krauss	B	500 mm	Construction site train
10	–	1887	SLM	B	950 mm	rack railway, ex FFS HG 2/2 951, to SV in 1909; in 1915 passed to MCL (n° 241)
110	11	1906-1910	SLM	C	950 mm	rack and pinion, ex BOB HG 3/3 9, to SV in 1915; similar to MCL 261 ÷ 263
1 ÷ 4	12	1909-1911	SLM	C	950 mm	rack railway

Tram locomotives
Notation		Year	Builder	Running Gear	Gauge	Notes
Until 1915	from 1915 onwards	Year	Builder	Running Gear	Gauge	Notes
2, 6	1	1883	Cerimedo	B	950 mm	ex SAFRE 2, 6, to SV in 1900
73 ÷ 74	-	1884	Henschel	B	950 mm	passed to FTP in 1901
1 ÷ 4	2	1889-1890	Sigl	C	1000 mm
70 ÷ 72	3	1884-1885	Krauss	C	950 mm
75	4	1910	Krauss	C	950 mm
301	5	1897	SLM	C	1000 mm	ex Tramways de Cherbourg
302	6	1911	Henschel	C	1000 mm
-	7	1884-1885	Saronno	C	1000 mm
172	8	?	?	C	1000 mm
171 ÷ 184	14	1885-1886	Henschel	B	1445 mm
175, 178, 186, 188, 189	15	1885-1889	Henschel, Breda	B	1445 mm
182, 185, 187	16	1886	Esslingen	B	1445 mm
211 ÷ 215	17	1887	Henschel	B	1445 mm

=== Diesel locomotives ===
Diesel locomotives
Notation	Year	Builder	Running gear	Notes
Ld 401	1937	Deutz	B	ex DR Köf II, then LDn 601
Ld 402 ÷ 403	1959-1961	Ranzi	B	Former Raccordi Ferroviari Marghera, at SV since 1975
Ld 404	1960	MaK	D	Purchased in 1974 by Bentheimer Eisenbahn
Ld 405	1976	MaK	C
DE 424.01 ÷ 09	1958	TIBB	Bo'Bo'
LDn 601	1937	Deutz	B	ex DR Köf II, formerly Ld 401
LDn 602	1954	Deutz	B

=== Electric locomotives ===
Electric locomotives
Notation	Year	Builder	Running Gear	Notes
E 401 ÷ 406	1926-1928	Carminati & Toselli-CGE	B

== Railcars ==
=== Steam railcars ===
Steam railcars
Notation	Year	Builder	Running Gear	Notes
A1 ÷ A2	1904	Brünn	A1

=== Diesel Railcars ===
Diesel railcars
Group	Notation	Year	Builder	Running Gear	Notes
ADn 500	501 ÷ 509	1936-1938	Stanga	B2'
ADn 550	550	1933	Breda	(1A)2'	former Bologna-Pieve di Cento and Bologna-Malalbergo tramways, to SV in 1956
ADn 600	601 ÷ 602; 603 ÷ 604; 605 ÷ 610; 611 ÷ 613	1962; 1972; 1980; 1981	Fiat; Fiat; OMECA; Fiat	(1A)(A1)	type FS ALn 668.1400 type FS ALn 668.1800 type FS ALn 668.1000 type FS ALn 668.3000
ADn 800	801 ÷ 809	1957-1961	Stanga	B2'
ADn 900	901 ÷ 910	1984-1998	Fiat	(1A)(A1)	type FS ALn 663, total of fourteen units

=== Electric railcars ===
Electric railcars
Notation	Year	Builder	Running Gear	Gauge	Supply
001 ÷ 010	1908-1909	MAN-AEG Thomson Houston	Bo' 2	1445 mm	6600 V 25 Hz ca
021 ÷ 024	1928-1929	OMS-CGE	Bo' 2	1445 mm	6600 V 25 Hz ca
041 ÷ 044	1910	MAN-AEG Thomson Houston	Bo' Bo'	1445 mm	6600 V 25 Hz ca
051 ÷ 056	1913	MAN-Thomson Houston	(Ao1)'(1Ao)'	1000 mm	975 V cc

== Sources ==
- Cornolò, Giovanni (2005). La Società Veneta Ferrovie (2 ed.). Ponte San Nicolò: Duegi editrice. ISBN 8890097965.
