= Metromare =

Bus rapid transit service in Rimini and Riccione, Italy

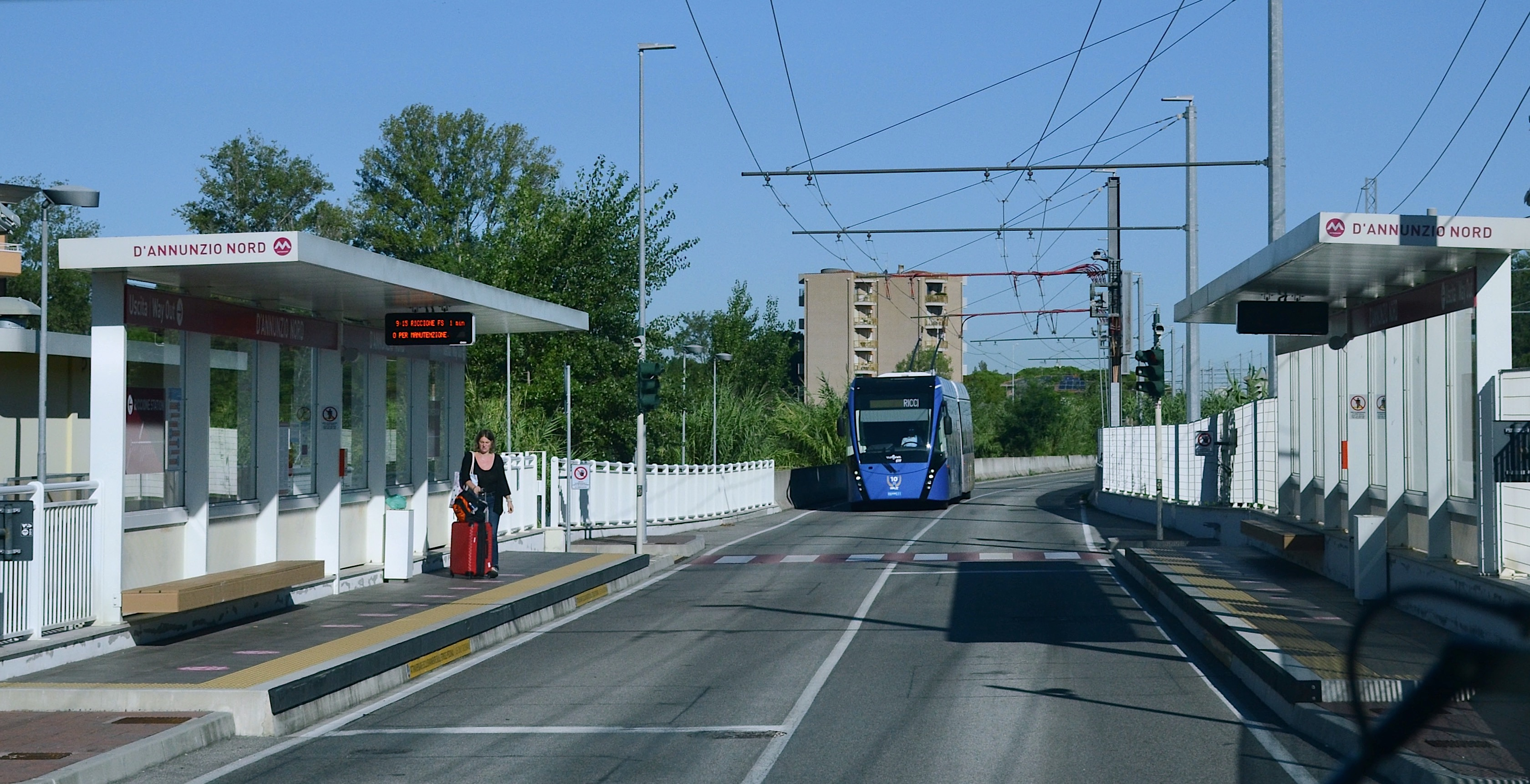
- A typical Metromare station in 2022

Overview
- Owner: Patrimonio Mobilità Provincia di Rimini
- Area served: Rimini; Riccione
- Locale: Province of Rimini (RN), Emilia-Romagna, Italy
- Transit type: Bus rapid transit Trolleybus
- Number of lines: 1
- Number of stations: 17
- Annual ridership: 416,150 (2021)

Operation
- Began operation: 23 November 2019; 6 years ago
- Operator: Start Romagna SpA
- Rolling stock: Van Hool ExquiCity18T
- Number of vehicles: 9

Technical
- System length: 9.8 km (6.1 mi)
- Electrification: 750 V DC, overhead lines
Map of Metromare
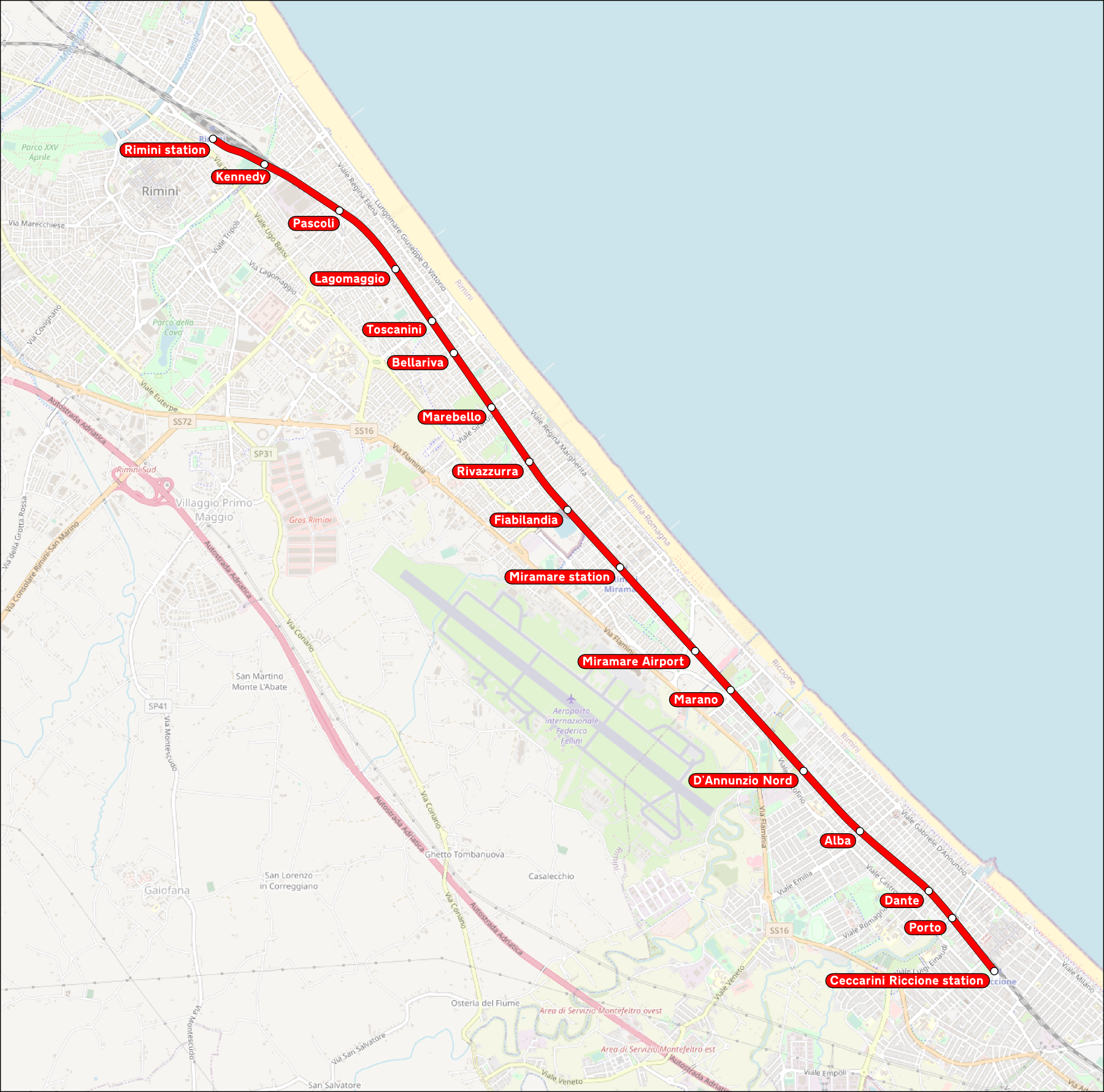

Metromare is a bus rapid transit, 9.8 km (6.1 mi) line in the province of Rimini, Italy. Part of Rimini's trolleybus system, the line runs between the railway stations of Rimini and Riccione on a segregated track beside the Bologna–Ancona railway. Fifteen intermediate stops serve the coastal suburbs, the touristic seafront, Federico Fellini International Airport, and the Fiabilandia amusement park. Launched in November 2019, the service operated by Start Romagna SpA.

Metromare is the culmination of decades-long planning of coastal rapid transit projects in the Romagna region. It is envisaged that the line could eventually be extended to serve the length of the riviera romagnola from Ravenna to Cattolica, forming a regional rapid transit network. A 4.2 km (2.6 mi) northern extension to Rimini Fiera has been approved, with construction starting in summer 2024.

In local politics, Metromare has been a controversial project, with opponents criticising its 78-million-euro construction cost and its protracted planning and construction, which spanned a quarter of a century. The opposition was particularly strong in Riccione, causing a rift between the provincial and municipal governments. Further criticism surrounded the decision to launch the service provisionally with buses, following a delay in the delivery of nine trolleybuses which ultimately entered service in October 2021. Metromare's proponents cite its environmental benefits and the relief it provides on traffic congestion and the route 11 trolleybus, which also connects Rimini and Riccione but runs along the principal seafront avenue.

== Overview ==
=== Route ===
The current Metromare system runs on a 9.8 km (6.1 mi) long track entirely segregated from outside traffic and adjacent to the Bologna–Ancona railway. Almost 60 percent of the route has only a single bi-directional lane while the remainder has two lanes, but there are two sets of overhead trolley wires – one for each direction – along the entire line. Traffic signals control the movement of vehicles in the one-lane sections. Just beyond the Riccione terminus, Metromare vehicles briefly leave the busway to turn around via a small roundabout in front of the railway station; this is the only place where the route's trolleybuses run along public streets during the service day, but they do not carry passengers during this manoeuvre.

The route starts at Rimini railway station in the city centre, with connections to regional and national Trenitalia railway services, local and suburban buses, and coaches to San Marino. The next stop southbound, Kennedy, gives access to the Roman amphitheatre. Two further stops (Pascoli, Lagomaggio) complete the section in the frazione of Rimini. The roadway is only one lane wide at Lagomaggio, but is two lanes wide at all other stations.

In the frazione of Bellariva, the Toscanini stop is closest to the hospital, and is followed by Bellariva, Marebello and Rivazzurra in their homonymous frazioni. The Fiabilandia stop in Rivazzurra serves the amusement park. In the frazione of Miramare, Miramare Station interchanges with Rimini Miramare railway station. The Miramare Airport stop is located near Federico Fellini International Airport. The following stops (Marano, D'Annunzio Nord, Alba, Dante) fall in the comune of Riccione. Porto is located above the Rio Melo and gives access to the port in Riccione. The route terminates at Ceccarini Riccione Station, which is served by regional and national railway services and local and suburban buses.

=== Service ===
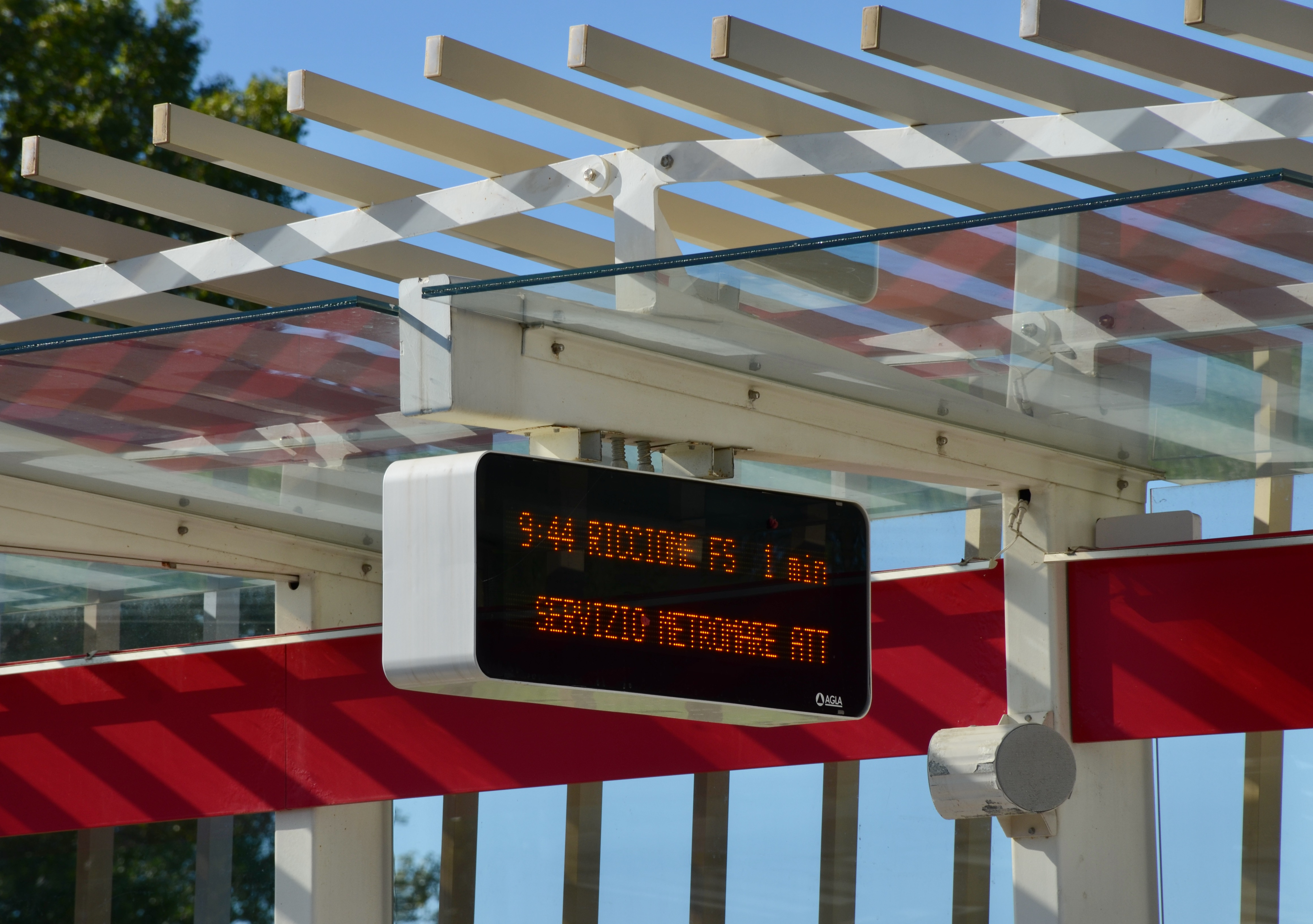
Stations have information displays that use real-time data to indicate when the next vehicle will arrive.

As of June 2023, on weekdays, the first trolleybuses leave the route termini at 5.30am. In "winter" (mid-September to around June), the last trolleybus leaves Rimini Station at midnight and returns by 12.47am. On weekdays in the summer festive period, the last trolleybuses depart at approximately 2.00am. The typical weekday service pattern between 8.00am and 9.00pm is every 15 minutes during the "winter" timetable and every 10 minutes during the "summer" touristic high season (from around June to mid-September), with fewer services in the early morning and late evening. Reduced services operate on bank holidays. As well as the U-turns at the end of the lines, there are intermediate turning areas at Toscanini and Miramare Station, allowing trolleybuses to terminate early at these stops. (Note: As of June 2023, the first Riccione-bound journey in the morning departs from Bellariva, but the intermediate turning areas are otherwise not in scheduled use. Only the turning loop immediately southeast of Miramare Airport station is equipped with overhead wires.)

The service is operated by Start Romagna SpA, contracted by the Patrimonio Mobilità Provincia di Rimini (PMR). In January 2023, the stops of Toscanini, Alba, Dante and Porto were equipped with lifts.

=== Fares ===
Metromare is integrated with Start Romagna's local bus services, and tickets can be used interchangeably on the two modes of transport. Tickets can be purchased on board at surcharge, at the route terminals, or in local convenience shops and dedicated vendors. Travel between Rimini Station and Miramare Airport falls in Rimini's urban zone, and travel between Miramare Station and Riccione Station falls in Riccione's urban zone. Miramare's stops count as neutral fare zones. Tickets are available for travel within either fare zone or across both fare zones. Metromare is integrated into the Rail SmartPass, an intermodal multi-day travel pass valid for regional Trenitalia trains in Romagna and Start Romagna buses.

Since August 2023, two non-electric folding bicycles have been allowed aboard per trolleybus between 9am and noon and 3pm and 7pm. Those travelling with a bicycle are required to pay an extra ticket.

== Fleet ==
Current fleet
Builder and model	Type	Image	Length (metres)	Capacity			Qty.	Fleet numbers	Built	Entered service	Notes
Builder and model	Type	Image	Length (metres)	Std.	Sdg.	Total	Qty.	Fleet numbers	Built	Entered service	Notes
Van Hool ExquiCity 18T	Articulated trolleybus		18.6	37	110	147	9	36511–36519	2020	October 2021	During Rimini's touristic high season (from around June to mid-September), six are in use at any one time (10-minute spacing), with three spare, while only four vehicles are required in the remainder of the year (15-minute spacing). The trolleybuses use Kiepe electrical equipment.

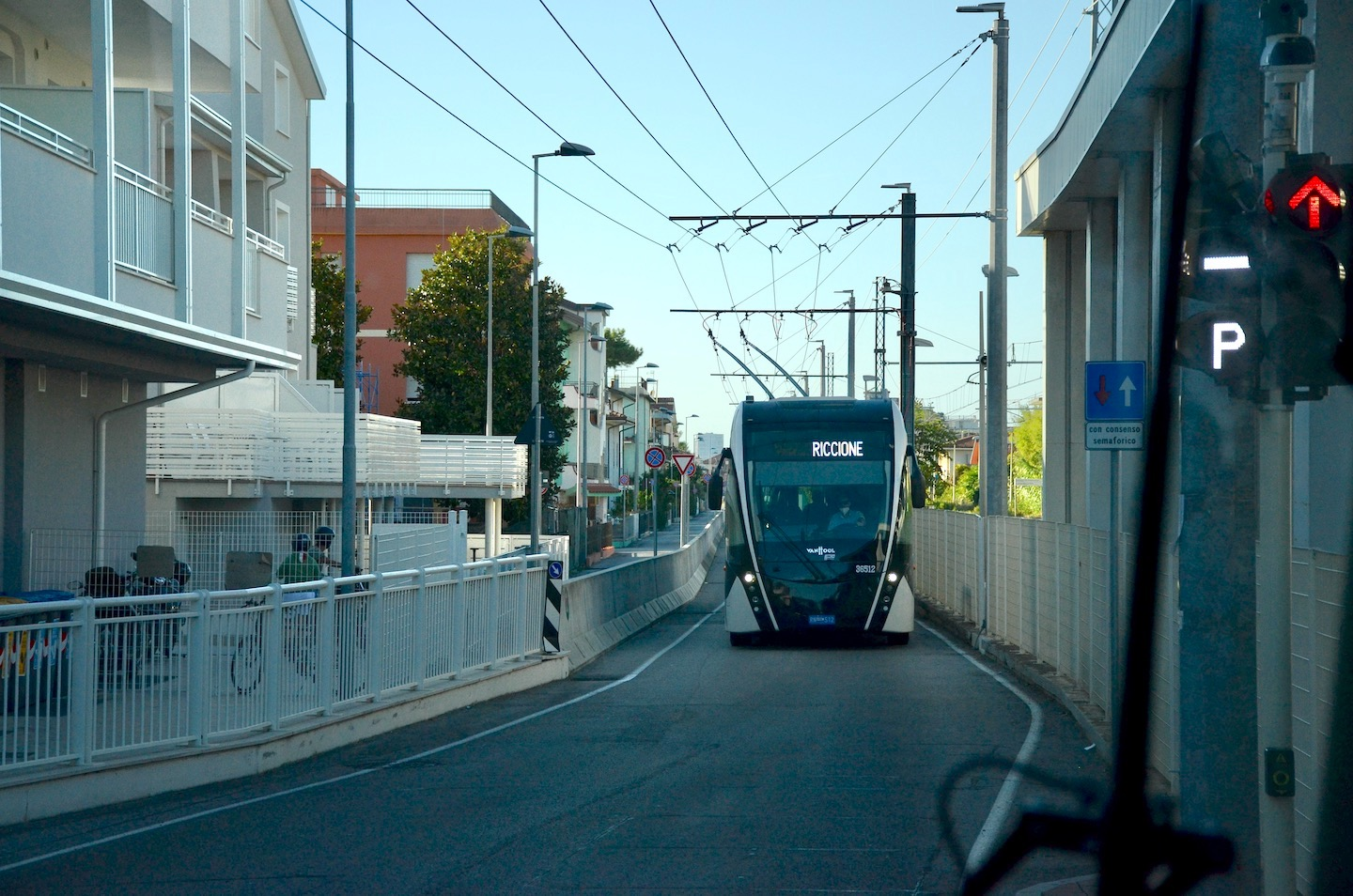
One of the Van Hool ExquiCity trolleybuses leaving a section of bidirectional single-lane busway at Miramare Station, 2022

The fleet is housed at the depot on Viale Carlo Alberto della Chiesa, which also services route 11's trolleybuses. Trolleybuses must use their auxiliary batteries to travel between the depot and the route because the depot is not connected with overhead wiring.

Between its launch in November 2019 and the trolleybuses' arrival in October 2021, Metromare temporarily used eight buses. These were four Iveco Urbanway 18 Hybrid buses, loaned from TPER Bologna (TPER fleet numbers 6400–6403); four IIA CityMood 12 CNG buses (Start Romagna fleet numbers 32320–32323); and four Neoplan N4522 Centroliner G buses (Start Romagna fleet numbers 36041, 36043–36045).

== History ==
=== Background ===
Before Metromare, the towns of Rimini and Riccione were connected by public transport through regional trains and the route 11 trolleybus, which runs along the principal seafront avenue in Rimini. Especially during the tourist season, congestion could slow journeys considerably, with trolleybuses taking up to an hour to complete the route.

In March 1994, city planner Leonardo Benevolo proposed a metropolitana costiera in a package of urban projects for Rimini, with a projected cost of Lit. 120 billion. The line would run double-tracked from the site of the new Rimini Fiera to Riccione using guided trolleybuses. The project was approved by the regional assembly in June 1994, and expected to open in 2000. In March 1996, the central government approved a loan of Lit. 62 billion. Rimini and Riccione municipal council approved the programme by spring 1998, which would, until February 2018, become known as Trasporto Rapido Costiero (TRC) (Coastal Rapid Transport). The project's controversies would later echo early opposition from this period, including the project's expected costs and its effects on surrounding properties and existing trees. The TRC was a significant theme in Rimini's 1999 municipal elections after unsuccessful campaigns for the issue to go to referendum in Rimini and Riccione.

=== Construction ===
The central government committed to funding the project in 2006, but the disbursement of these funds was delayed to 2011. The contracts for engineering and constructing the line were signed in 2008. Construction took place between July 2012 and late 2017, conducted by a temporary association of companies: Italiana Costruzioni SpA for the civil engineering; Balfour Beatty Rail for the traction system; and Project Automation SpA for the auxiliary operation systems. The construction included four new vehicular underpasses to replace existing railway level crossings, three new and nine refurbished pedestrian underpasses, nine new road bridges, two new bridges over water and a further seven new bridges over streams and ditches. Installation of the overhead wires for trolleybuses was about half completed by August 2017. In December 2017, the completed bus-only roadway was tested by conventional articulated buses from Start's existing fleet. In 2018, further works installed the remaining overhead wires, constructed the stops, and tested the automated control centre. Three AG300T trolleybuses from route 11 carried out the first tests of the wiring and substations of the TRC line in March 2018.

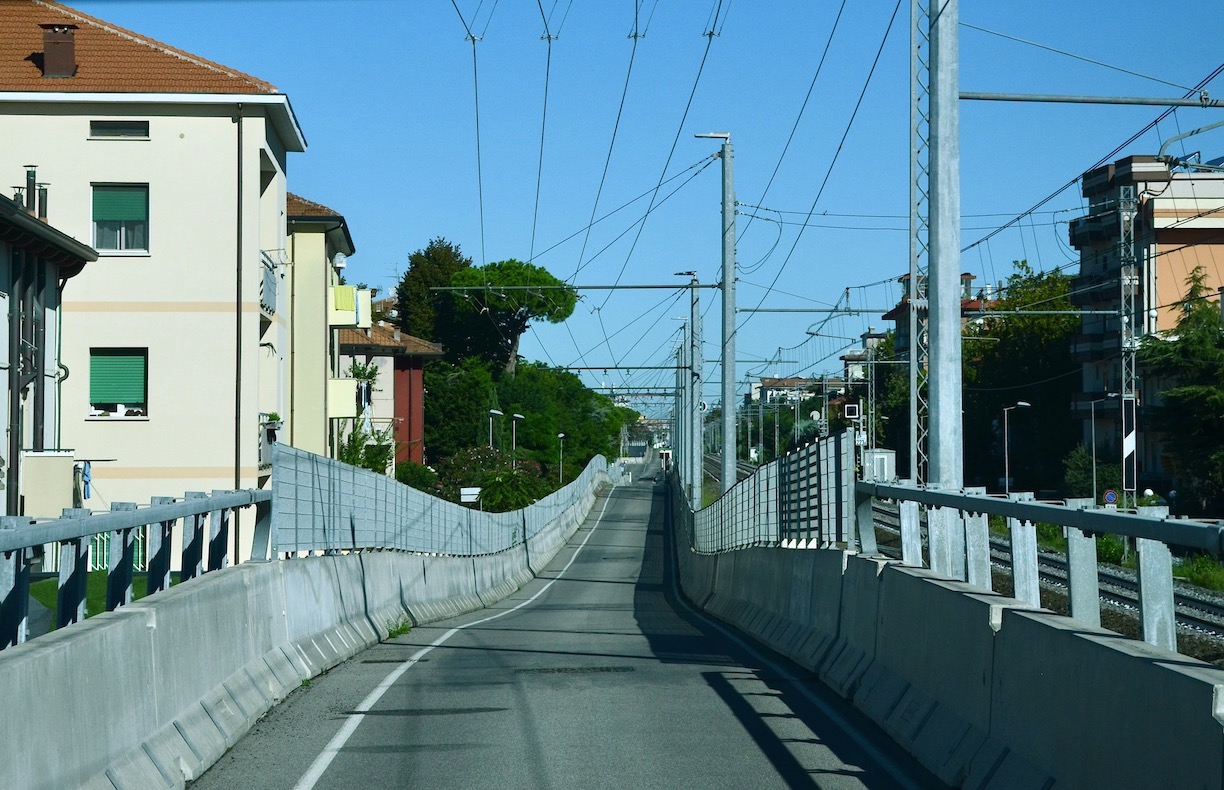
One of several sections of bidirectional one-lane roadway, with the adjacent railway line visible on the right

By spring 2019, structural and vehicular testing along the route were complete and Metromare merely required the approval of the Ministry of Infrastructure and Transport to launch, which it would receive in September. While the provincial mayor hoped to launch the service in October 2019, a further month's delay took place.

Metromare's infrastructure cost was estimated at just over 78 million euros, below the 81 million euros that had been set aside at the time of the project's approval in 2006. The central government was budgeted to pay for 42 million euros of this cost, with local and regional government agencies providing 38 million euros. The contract for the trolleybuses cost a further 10.6 million euros, mostly paid by local agencies. Several separate urban projects later accompanied the Metromare, including an additional 1,400 parking spaces across the Kennedy, Toscanini, Rivazzurra, and Miramare Station stops, and a new piazzetta on Rivazzurra's Via dei Martiri. The parking spaces are partly intended to replace those removed along the seafront by the redevelopment of the pedestrian esplanade.

Metromare was expected to eliminate between 12,000 and 15,000 car journeys a day, equal to an 11% drop in fine particles along Rimini's coastal route per year.

=== Launch and operation ===
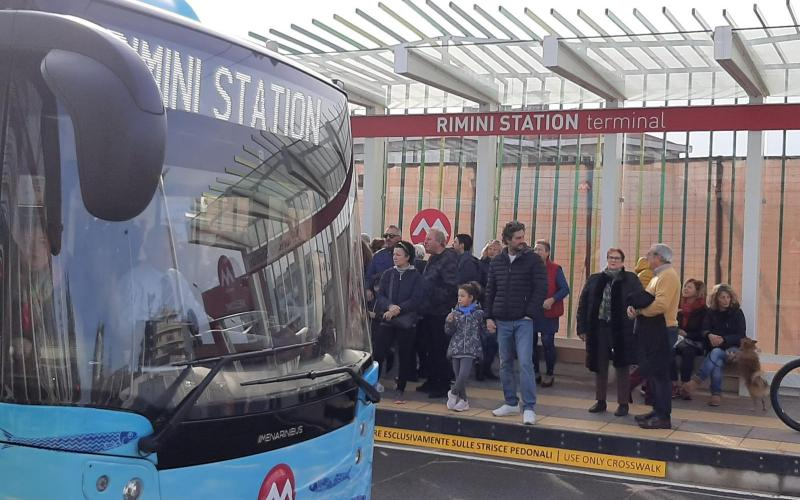
A bus at the Rimini Station terminus during the line's opening days in November 2019

Metromare launched on 23 November 2019. 17,000 passengers used the service in its inaugural weekend, for which all journeys were free. 7,915 passengers used Metromare the subsequent week. Due to a delay in the delivery of the nine VanHool Exquicity 18T trolleybuses purchased to run on the line, operations used traditional buses.

Due to the COVID-19 pandemic in Italy, Metromare services were suspended on 21 March 2020. Following a request by the provincial government, services resumed on 25 July 2020 with reduced capacity. After a further pandemic-induced delay, the first trolleybus was delivered to Rimini on 12 June 2020, and the vehicles entered service in October 2021.

In May 2023, it was reported that the new Line E of Rome Metro, connecting Rome to Ostia, would be branded as Metromare. PMR's president said that they had registered the Metromare name and logo in January 2021, and did not plan to bring legal action.

=== Extension to Rimini Fiera ===
In January 2020, Paola De Micheli, the Minister of Infrastructure and Transport, announced that 49 million euros would be made available for the 4.2 km (2.6 mi) northwards extension of Metromare to Rimini Fiera. The municipal government considered an option to run the extension on the road network, raising concerns about its impact on traffic. It ultimately chose to run the extension beside the railway, citing a quicker project execution, as required by the deadlines of the central government funding.

The intermediate stops (from north to south) are Fiera di Rimini Est-Teodorico; Popilia; Sacramora; Rivabella; San Giuliano; and Principe Amedeo. (Note: In previous planning, the stop after Rimini Fiera was simply "Fiera di Rimini Est", and Sacramora was named "Celle".) The route is double-tracked between Rimini Fiera and Rivabella, and single-tracked from after Rivabella to Rimini Station. An additional six trolleybuses will be purchased to run the service, and the journey from Rimini Fiera to Ceccarini Riccione Station will take 31 minutes. Among the districts served will be the historic fishing quarter of Borgo San Giuliano, the coastal Rivabella suburb, the Monumental Cemetery of Rimini near the Sacramora stop, and the Rimini Fiera exhibition centre.

In April 2023, the works contract was due to be awarded in December 2023, with construction starting in the summer of 2024. However, multiple delays since then have altered the schedule, and as of September 2025 work is forecast to begin in 2026. The project requires two new bridges over water, four new vehicular underpasses, and two new and three refurbished pedestrian underpasses. The extension is expected to be completed in 2028.

=== Future expansions ===
From its inception, proposals have suggested that the system could be expanded as a regional network, running the length of Romagna's coastline from Ravenna to Cattolica. At Metromare's launch, the regional president suggested that the line could extend as far north as Comacchio. Closer to Rimini, a northern extension to the school campuses in the suburb of Viserba has been proposed, either running adjacent to the Ferrara–Rimini railway or as a branch exiting at the Sacramora stop and running along existing roads.

The third stage of the Metromare is expected to be a southern extension to Misano and Cattolica. The extension is opposed by some Misano municipal councillors. Renata Tosi, the Mayor of Riccione from 2014 to 2022, campaigned for the extension to follow existing roads and functionally connect important coastal districts rather than areas along the railway line, also to counteract the "urban disfigurement" that the first stage had caused. In October 2022, Riccione's new municipal administration ordered technical studies to evaluate the options of running the extension along the railway or along the principal seafront avenue.

Several officials and political parties support connecting the Metromare to inland towns, including Santarcangelo and Morciano di Romagna.

== Controversies ==
=== Opposition to construction ===
Many local politicians have criticised the project's 78-million-euro construction cost as well as its protracted planning and construction phases, which spanned a quarter of a century. Some considered the project to be outdated. Responding to demands that the project be stopped in March 2013, the general manager of Rimini's mobility agency estimated that it would cost 51 million euros. Opponents likened the project to a TAV romagnola. (Note: The reference is to the proposed high-speed railway (Treno Alta Velocità) connecting Lyon and Turin, which attracted an organised coalition of "No TAV" opponents.)

At a protest at a construction site in 2014, a protestor produced an anonymous document claiming that Agenzia di Mobilità (AM), the agency overseeing the construction works, was filling excavation sites in Riccione with untreated sludge, and she asked representatives about the veracity of the claim. The protestor was sued by AM for defamation; in November 2019, the Court of Rimini overturned her initial conviction, citing her protected constitutional right to critique.

The demolition of properties to make way for the line attracted local opposition. The project required 680 expropriation decrees, many relating to land containing buildings and garages. Via Serra in Bellariva was particularly affected, becoming a flashpoint of community opposition. In total, 96 appeals were filed against expropriation orders, all of which were won by PMR.

==== Riccione ====
Opposition to Metromare's construction was particularly pronounced in Riccione, straining the relationship between Riccione's municipal government and the other public agencies involved in the project. The approval of the Metromare system in 2011 by then-mayor Fabio Ubaldi created a climate of disapproval among many local residents. Following a request from Riccione's municipal administration, in April 2013, its financial commitment to the project was limited to 6.28 million euros. The June 2014 municipal elections saw the election of centre-right Renata Tosi as Mayor of Riccione. Tosi was an outspoken critic of the Metromare, who campaigned to block the line from reaching the comune and cancel the entire project, appealing directly to Matteo Renzi, the Prime Minister.

The construction of a retaining concrete wall along the track, up to six metres high, caused notable consternation. An open letter from Riccione's hoteliers association warned against the disfigurement it would create. To avoid the wall, in June 2014, Tosi's administration presented an alternative route to run the line in Riccione along existing roads nearer to the seafront; this was rejected by the project's coordination committee, leading to the direct intervention of the Ministry of Infrastructure and Transport. Both the regional administrative court and the Council of State rejected Riccione's appeal against the committee's decision. In September 2015, an engineer hired by Tosi's administration concluded that the proposed route would not reduce journey times by using smart traffic lights, and could reduce construction costs by 7 million euros. The proposal was backed by the city's hoteliers association, a Rimini-based industrial trade association, and the provincial president of Confcommercio, an association of commercial enterprises. The coordination committee rejected the engineer's findings, projecting that the proposal would increase journey times and construction and operating costs while decreasing road safety.

Community tension shrouded the felling of over 200 pine trees in Via Portovenere. In April 2014, a demonstration outside the town hall decried the felling. In June, Tosi attended an occupation of the construction site and issued an injunction to halt the works, which was later overturned. 200 protesters regathered at the site, and the felling was supervised by around 70 police officers. For her part in the protest, the carabinieri charged Tosi with complicity in the interruption of public works, criminal damage, and abuse of public office. Via Portovenere returned to local news in April 2015 after residents were given short notice to evacuate their courtyards and garages for works on the line.

In October 2014, AM threatened Tosi's administration with legal action for failing to regulate traffic flows to allow works in Riccione to proceed. The works had already been postponed by one month on the municipality's request. Tosi believed that the threat was politicised to bend Riccione against backing down. In March 2015, the coordination committee elected to replace Riccione's representative on the committee with an ad hoc commissioner for matters relating to road regulations. Local politicians described the move as anti-democratic and authoritarian. In May 2015, AM and the municipal administration further clashed on the closure of an underpass in Via Puccini.

In May 2015, over a thousand residents formed a human chain protest at a construction site in Viale Rimini, where 89 trees were felled. After a municipal ordinance to stop works in Viale Rimini was overturned in August 2015, the municipal administration accused the regional administrative court of a "now prejudicial attitude" against its concerns. The administration also protested against the felling of trees in Via delle Magnolie, citing conservation laws.

Local politicians criticised Tosi's administration for its stubborn opposition to the project and causing unnecessary, costly delays. In January 2021, the preliminary hearing judge of the Court of Rimini indicted Tosi for abuse of office, relating to ordinances she issued to obstruct Metromare's construction. PMR had sued Tosi for civil damage claims of 2.35 million euros. Riccione municipal councillors from across the political system expressed their solidarity with Tosi. Tosi, who retired at the 2022 municipal election, was acquitted at the trial in July 2022.

==== Uninvolved municipalities ====
In October 2015, Cattolica's municipal administration protested against invoices produced by AM totalling 72,000 euros for the planning phase of Metromare's southern extension.

In March 2021, the administration of Bellaria – Igea Marina, north of Rimini, protested that the municipality was asked to absorb an increase in provincial transport costs that they attributed to Metromare. The councillors reaffirmed that the project had increased the investment gap between Rimini's northern and southern suburbs, and that Metromare was prioritised for regional funding. The municipality said that it was initially agreed that areas that would not benefit from Metromare would not be asked to contribute to its construction, but that this was later rescinded on the justification that the project was a coastal service.

=== Vehicular delays and provisional launch ===
The project envisaged a fleet of nine articulated trolleybuses to run on the system. In November 2014, the Dutch APTS group that had been contracted in 2010 by Balfour Beatty Rail to supply trolleybuses of its Phileas design ceased trading, and the contract passed to ATI, a group formed by transport vehicle manufacturers Van Hool and Kiepe Electric. The first APTS Phileas trolleybus for Rimini had already been completed and was delivered in 2014, but the dissolution of APTS led to uncertainty over who would build the remaining vehicles and what design would replace the Phileas design. By 2017, it had been agreed that Van Hool would replace the original order with one for nine of its ExquiCity 18T trolleybuses. (And the prototype Phileas vehicle was sold to a dealer in secondhand vehicles.) The fleet was supposed to be delivered between August 2019 and January 2020, but this delivery was delayed. PMR levied a penalty of 1,000 euros per vehicle per day of delay. It declined an offer from the suppliers to use four experimental vehicles.

In August 2019, the coordination committee decided to launch Metromare provisionally with buses. Local politicians criticised the replacement buses as polluting and incompatible with the platform for wheelchair users. Some also accused the provisional launch of being an electoral stunt ahead of the regional elections. The provisional launch was projected to cost 1.1 million euros, including 640,000 euros in management costs, 188,000 euros for the installation of signalling systems inside the vehicles, and 57,000 euros for vehicle leases.

Riccione's municipal government formally objected to the provisional launch of the Metromare using alternative means, and sought legal advice to overturn the legitimacy of the decision. The municipal Democratic Party said that Riccione's mayor was acting "like that last Japanese with the helmet that continues to fight a battle lost from the start". At a hearing in Rimini's municipal council in October 2019, a councillor objected to the provisional launch going ahead without Riccione's consent, while another asked why the provisional launch was necessary given the existing alternative provided by the route 11 trolleybus.

Riccione's municipal government filed a legal appeal to suspend the provisional Metromare services on grounds of safety deficiencies relating to the route, replacement vehicles, and workplace standards; it lost the case in December 2019. In January 2020, Start Romagna drivers cited the dangerousness of the Metromare among their reasons for striking. The event of a bus collision along the track was simulated in an emergency exercise later that month, which Riccione politicians said should have been carried out before the launch. After the COVID-19 pandemic closed Metromare, Riccione's municipal government voted against resuming services until the trolleybuses could enter service.

The first trolleybus arrived on 12 June 2020. Testing began in July 2020 and the vehicles were approved in September 2021, entering service the following month.

=== Indirect airport connection ===
The Miramare Airport stop of the Metromare is located some 825 m (2,707 ft) by road away from the main entrance of Federico Fellini International Airport. The city council plans to transform the surrounding land into an urban park and a 200-space car park to serve the airport and seafront. To reach the airport, passengers descending from the Metromare need to go south along the Via Cavalieri di Vittorio Veneto, past the roundabout with Viale Losanna/Viale Felice Carlo Pullè, then northwest along the busy SS16 Via Flaminia state road. Moreover, at the time of Metromare's launch, the SS16 could not be crossed by foot near the airport. Instead, the route 9M bus, also operated by Start Romagna, connects the stop to the airport.

Local politicians have criticised the lack of a direct connection as an oversight of the project's planning. In September 2020, the Mayor of Riccione proposed a direct connection from the airport to the city's southern spa district.

In October 2019, PMR's president suggested that a moving walkway could be installed between the airport and the Metromare stop. The municipal council launched a feasibility study into the moving walkway in September 2023. The suggestion was derided by local politicians as fanciful and much costlier than a shuttle service. A feasbility study concluded that the covered walkway would cost 13.7 million euros, with annual operating costs of 288,000 euros.

In September 2021, the municipal council approved the replacement of the three-way directional interchange between the SS16 and the Via Cavalieri di Vittorio Veneto with a roundabout. The project would include lit segregated pedestrian walkways and a pedestrian crossing of the SS16 controlled by traffic lights.

In April 2023, Roberta Frisoni, Rimini's councillor for public transportation, argued that the variability of demand for a direct airport connection – dependent on the times of flights – meant that a shuttle connection between the Metromare stop and airport would be more appropriate than a branch of the Metromare. Frisoni further ruled out an underground branch, citing high costs and the geological difficulty presented by the superficial groundwater.

=== Future of the route 11 trolleybus ===
Metromare's route in Rimini parallels that of Start Romagna's route 11 trolleybus, which runs from Rimini's railway station to Riccione's Piazzale Curiel along the principal seafront avenue. At its inception, it was planned that the TRC would replace route 11 once opened, but this decision had been postponed by 2008. Several Rimini and Riccione municipal councillors have expressed concerns about the future of the trolleybus line given the competition provided by Metromare. Metromare has 17 stops compared to the route 11's 49, and a journey time of 23 minutes while route 11's often exceeds 45 minutes. Conversely, route 11 runs closer to the seafront, especially in Riccione, where stops are also more infrequent.

In the provisional phase, usage data suggested that the lines had distinct user bases. On Metromare's fare-less inaugural weekend during the winter period of 2019, usage of the route 11 trolleybus declined by 30%. In March 2020, Frisoni suggested halving the frequency of route 11 services to one every twenty to thirty minutes. The winter timetable for 2022–2023, effective from 15 September to 7 June, adopted a lengthened headway of 36 minutes for route 11, requiring just three vehicles, compared with 20 minutes in previous years. The summer 2022 timetable had an 18-minute headway on route 11, compared with 12 minutes in recent previous summers.

Metromare also competes with the route 9 bus, which runs from the airport to Rimini city centre, Rimini Fiera, and Santarcangelo or San Vito. Being further inland, the route 9 bus runs through, rather than beside, the residential districts in the southern suburbs and also serves the hospital, Colonnella district and Arch of Augustus.

=== Security ===
In April 2022, a candidate in Riccione's municipal elections said that the Metromare was "at the mercy of criminals and drug dealers" by night. There are ninety-eight CCTV cameras along the route and emergency intercoms at each station.

== Incidents ==
On New Year's Eve 2019, a bus was forced to brake at the Alba stop after a drunk trespasser jumped onto the track. Four passengers were taken to emergency care with minor injuries and the trespasser broke his collarbone. A disabled passenger broke both her legs and required home care services for at least two months.
