= Volvo B59 =

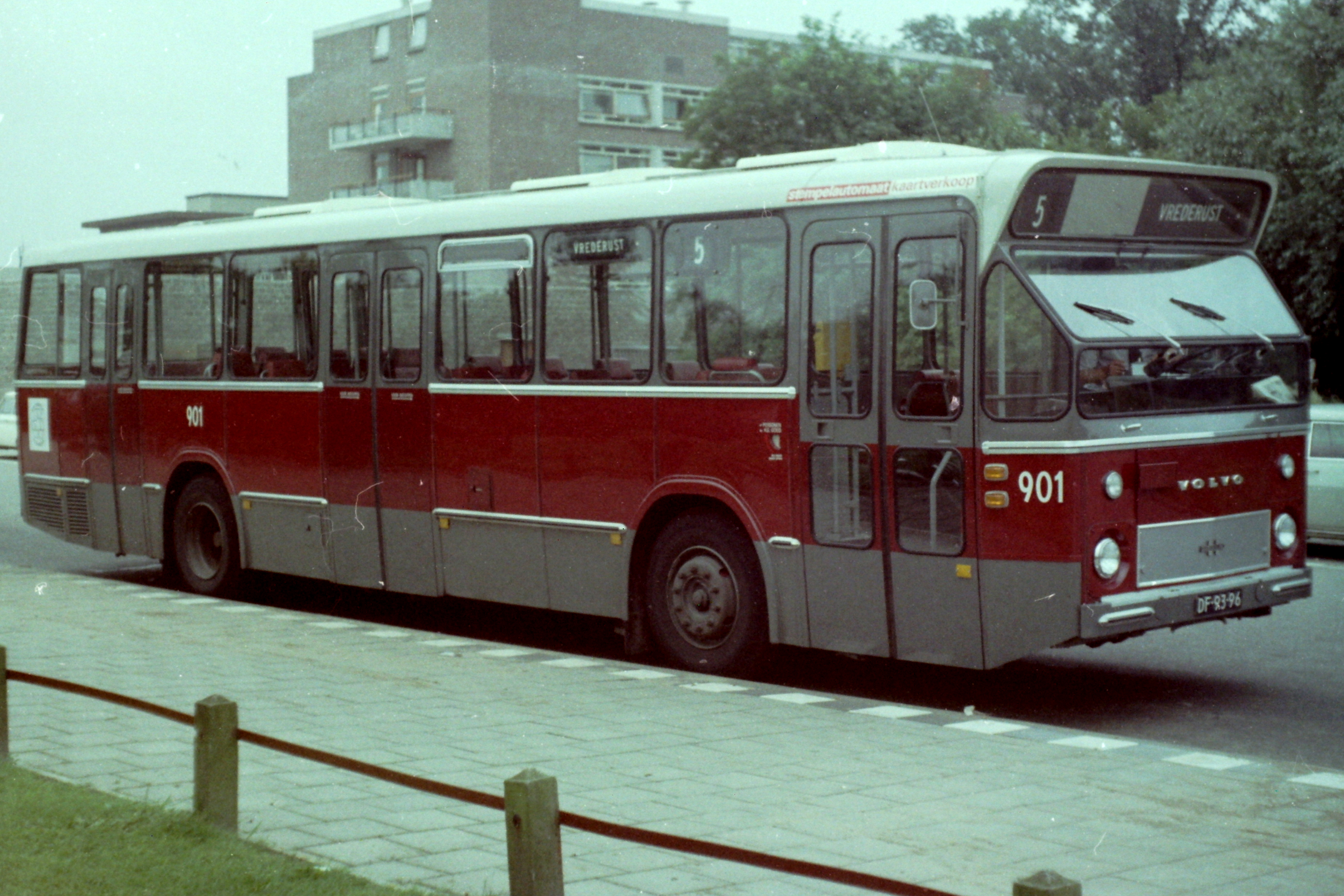
- HTM Hainje bodied Volvo B59-55 in The Hague

Overview
- Manufacturer: Volvo
- Production: 1970–1979
- Assembly: Sweden

Body and chassis
- Class: Bus chassis
- Floor type: Step entrance

Powertrain
- Engine: Horizontally rear-mounted I-6; Volvo THD100
- Capacity: 9.6 litres (2.1 imp gal; 2.5 US gal)
- Transmission: Voith or 2 speed ZF

Chronology
- Successor: Volvo B10R

The Volvo B59 was a rear-engined bus chassis manufactured by Volvo in Sweden between 1970 and 1979.

The first Volvo B59 was delivered to the Københavns Sporveje (The City Transport Authority in Copenhagen, Denmark) in 1970, and was fitted with a bodywork built by Aabenraa Karrosserifabrik in Aabenraa. Originally operated as a prototype, it came later entered ordinary service. After withdrawal, It was purchased by Volvo for preservation at the Volvo Museum in Gothenburg. At least 89 were subsequently purchased.

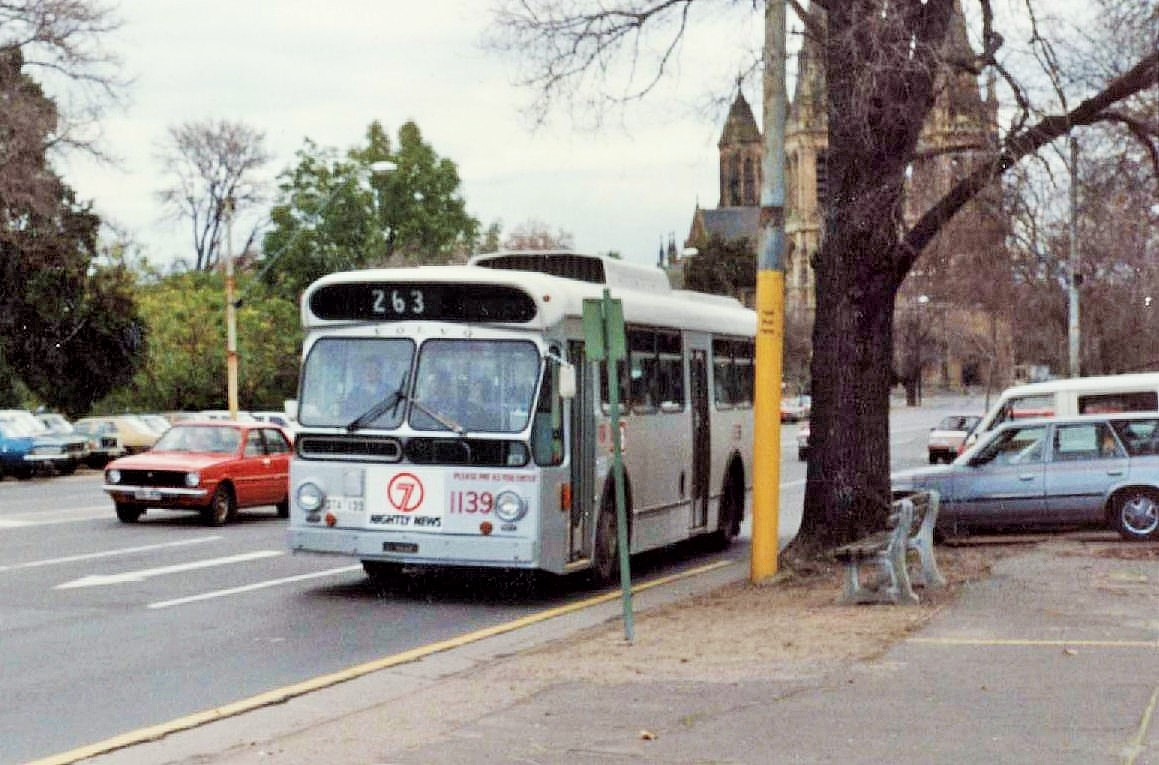
Adelaide Volvo B59 No.1139 on Route 263 to Marion SC. Seen on King William Road opposite Adelaide Oval.

The B59 was popular with Australian government operators. Brisbane City Council placed 98 in service between 1976 and 1978, State Transit Authority, Adelaide 307 between 1977 and 1979 and the Melbourne & Metropolitan Tramways Board 100. The State Transport Authority's 1002, was sent to Sweden for almost two years as a demonstrator.

Only one was built to UK specification, with Marshall bodying a demonstrator for Ailsa Bus, the UK Volvo dealers, in 1972. It was demonstrated across the country, but compared with the Leyland National, it was too expensive with no orders placed. Subsequent operators included Parks of Hamilton and Stag Garage of Lochgilphead.

A trolleybus version of Volvo B59 was also built. A batch of 17 vehicles, fitted with Ansaldo electric equipment and Mauri bodywork, was delivered to ATAM of Italian city Rimini between 1975 and 1978, for use on the Rimini–Riccione trolleybus line.

The B59 was also sold in Belgium, France, Holland, Portugal and Switzerland. It was succeeded by the B10R.
