= Volvo B10R =

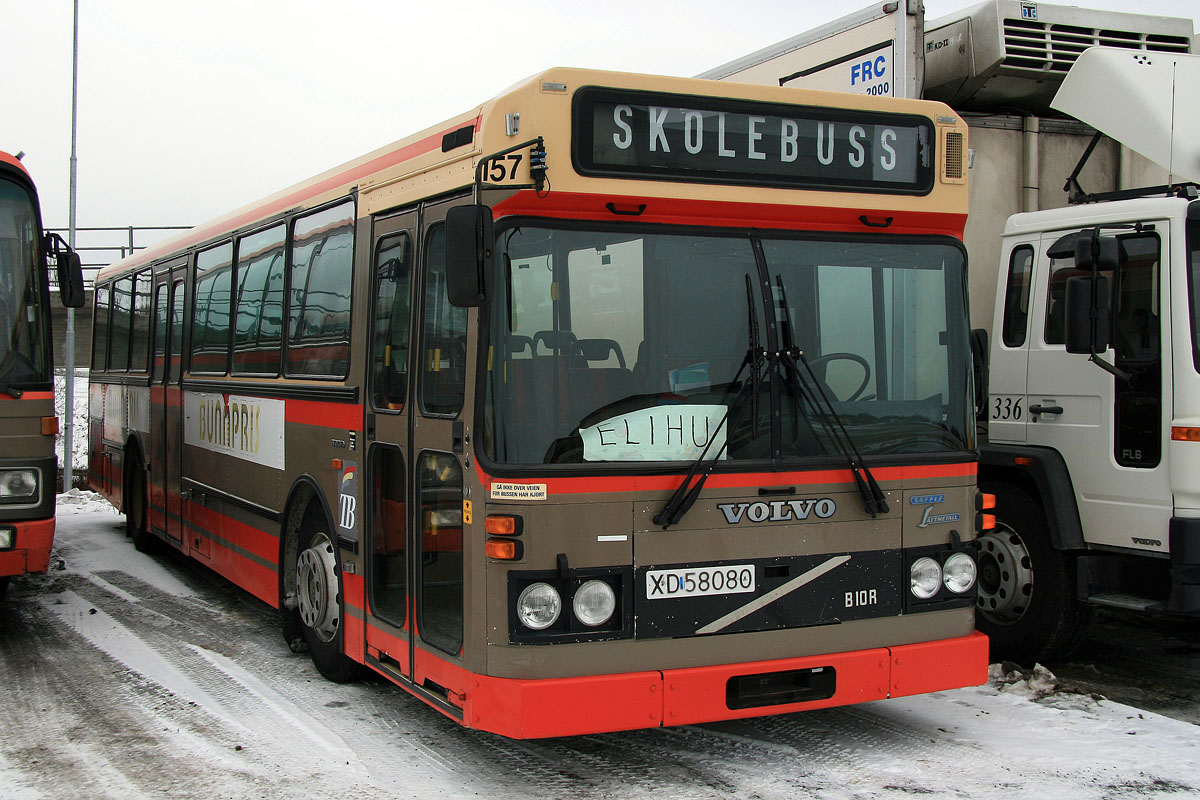
- TrønderBilene Säffle-bodied B10R in Levanger

Overview
- Manufacturer: Volvo
- Production: 1978–1992
- Assembly: Sweden

Body and chassis
- Class: Bus chassis
- Floor type: Step entrance

Powertrain
- Engine: 9.6-litre horizontally rear-mounted I-6; Volvo THD100

Chronology
- Predecessor: Volvo B59
- Successor: Volvo B10B

The Volvo B10R is a rear-engined bus chassis manufactured by Volvo between 1978 and 1992. It was as its predecessor, the B59, aimed as a citybus chassis, and was succeeded by the B10B in 1992.

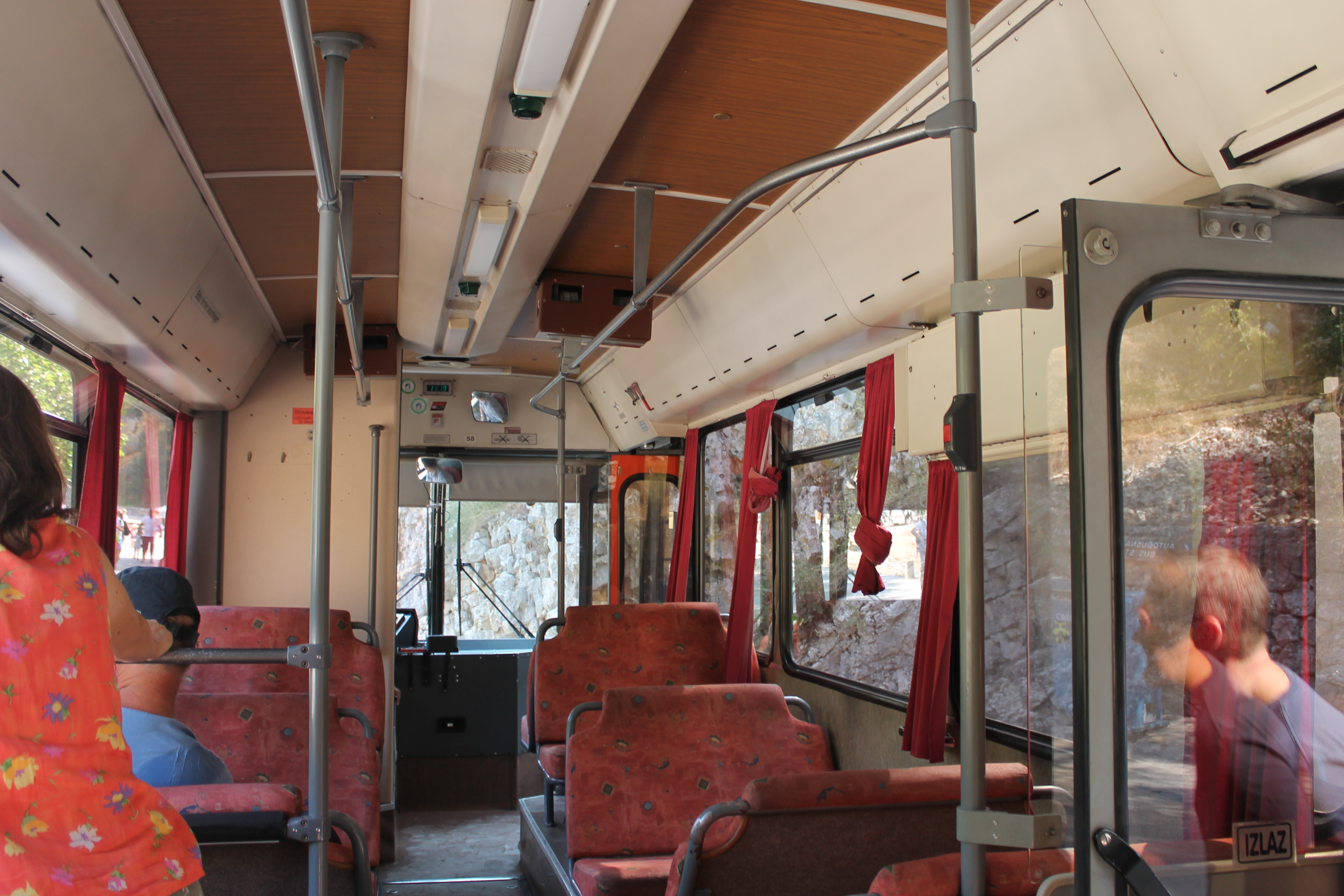
Bus interior

The B10Rs were bodied mainly by Aabenraa for Denmark, by Säffle and Aabenraa for Sweden by Arna, Säffle, by Hess in Switzerland, by Camo, Salvador Caetano and Irmãos Mota in Portugal and VBK for Norway.

In Australia, a few B10Rs were operated by Busways, Hornibrook Bus Lines and Surfside Buslines.
