= Poggio Berni =

- Comune
- Comune di Poggio Berni
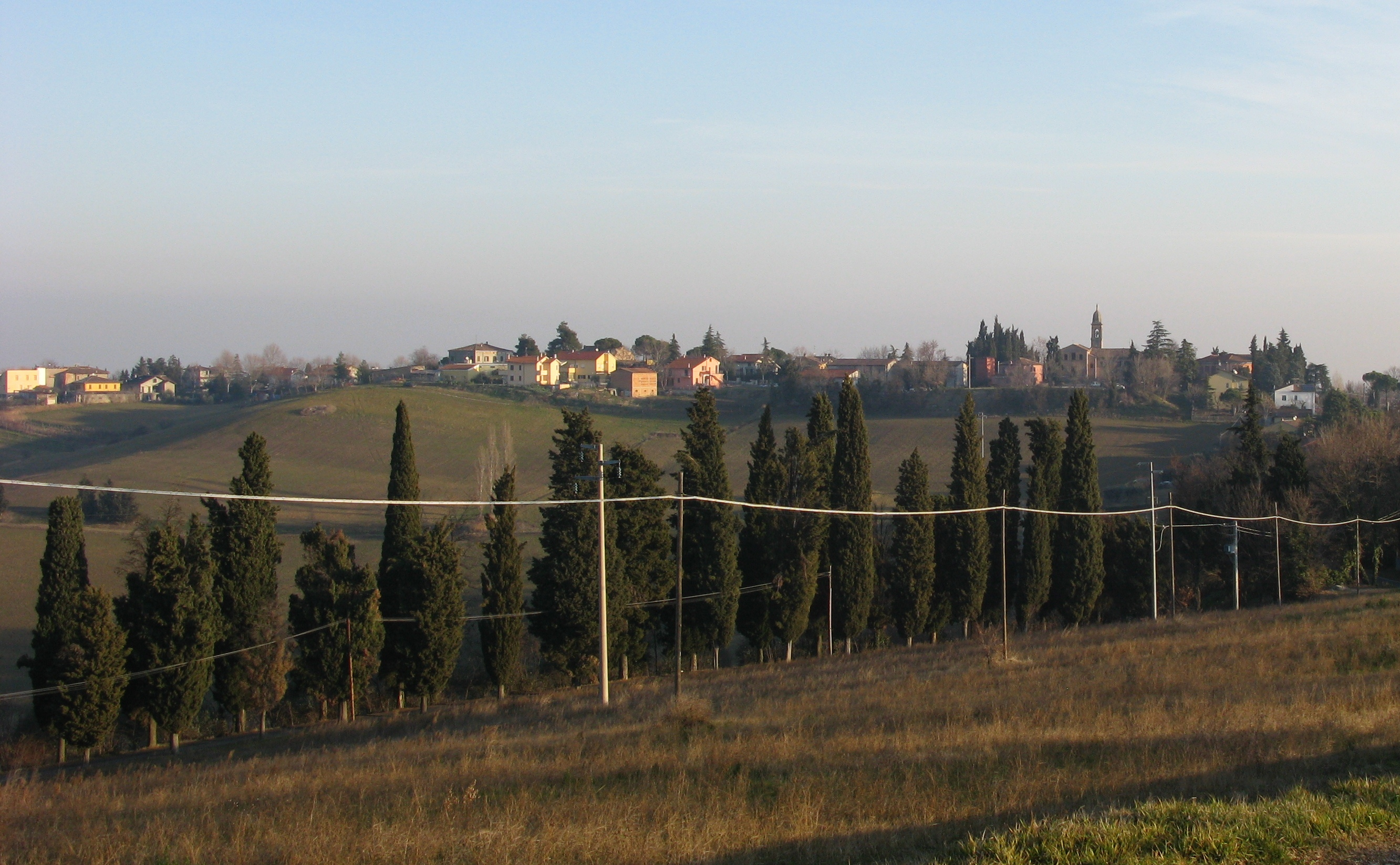

- Coat of arms

- Location within Italy Location within Emilia-Romagna
- Coordinates: 44°02′N 12°25′E
- Country: Italy
- Region: Emilia-Romagna
- Province: Rimini (RN)
- Frazioni: Camerano, Sant', Santo Marino, Trebbio

Government
  - Mayor: Daniele Amati

Area
  - Total: 11.80 km^{2} (4.56 sq mi)
- Elevation: 155 m (509 ft)

Population (2008)
  - Total: 3,241
  - Density: 274.7/km^{2} (711.4/sq mi)
- Demonym: Poggiobernesi
- Time zone: UTC+1 (CET)
  - Summer (DST): UTC+2 (CEST)
- Postal code: 47824
- Dialing code: 0541
- Patron saint: St. George
- Saint day: 23 April
- Website: Official website

Poggio Berni (E Pôz or E Puz in Romagnolo dialect) is a frazione and former commune of the Province of Rimini, in Emilia-Romagna, Italy.

Wine and oil are its leading products – with the DOC "Colli di Rimini" wines and an olive. Poggio Berni is home to the Palio dei Somari, a donkey race. Main sights include the remains of a castle held by the Malatesta family, and the Palazzo Marcosanti, a former fortress in the countryside, turned today into a tourist resort.

On 1 January 2014 Poggio Berni merged with Torriana, forming a new municipality called Poggio Torriana
