= Fiat 2401 Cansa =

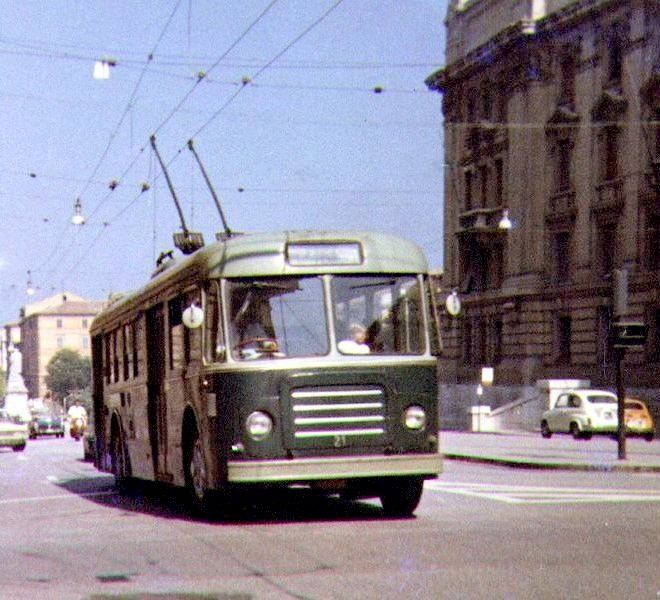
Fiat 2401 Cansa trolleybus in Ancona

The Fiat 2401 Cansa is an Italian trolleybus model produced by Fiat in the 1950s. It involved a chassis built by Fiat, model 2401, and a body made by Cansa,^{(IT)} of Novara, and was used by several Italian trolleybus systems.

== History ==
The production of the trolleybus started in 1953. The bus had 21 seats and in total can take 70 people. The length of Fiat 2401 Cansa is 10,5 m and it had 2 special looking doors. There was a luggage space in the back of the trolleybus.

== Cities where it was used ==
- Ancona, ATMA – 5 vehicles (built 1956/57; last units withdrawn 1987)
- Avellino, SFI – 4 vehicles (built 1953)
- Bologna, ATC – 10 vehicles (built 1955)
- Livorno, ATAM – 4 vehicles (built 1954)
- Modena, AMCM – 2 vehicles (built 1953)
- Parma, AMETAG – 16 vehicles (built 1953)
- Rimini, ATAM – 4 vehicles (in service 1954–1978)
- Turin, ATM – 12 vehicles (built 1953–1955, withdrawn 1978)
