= Torriana =

- Comune
- Comune di Torriana
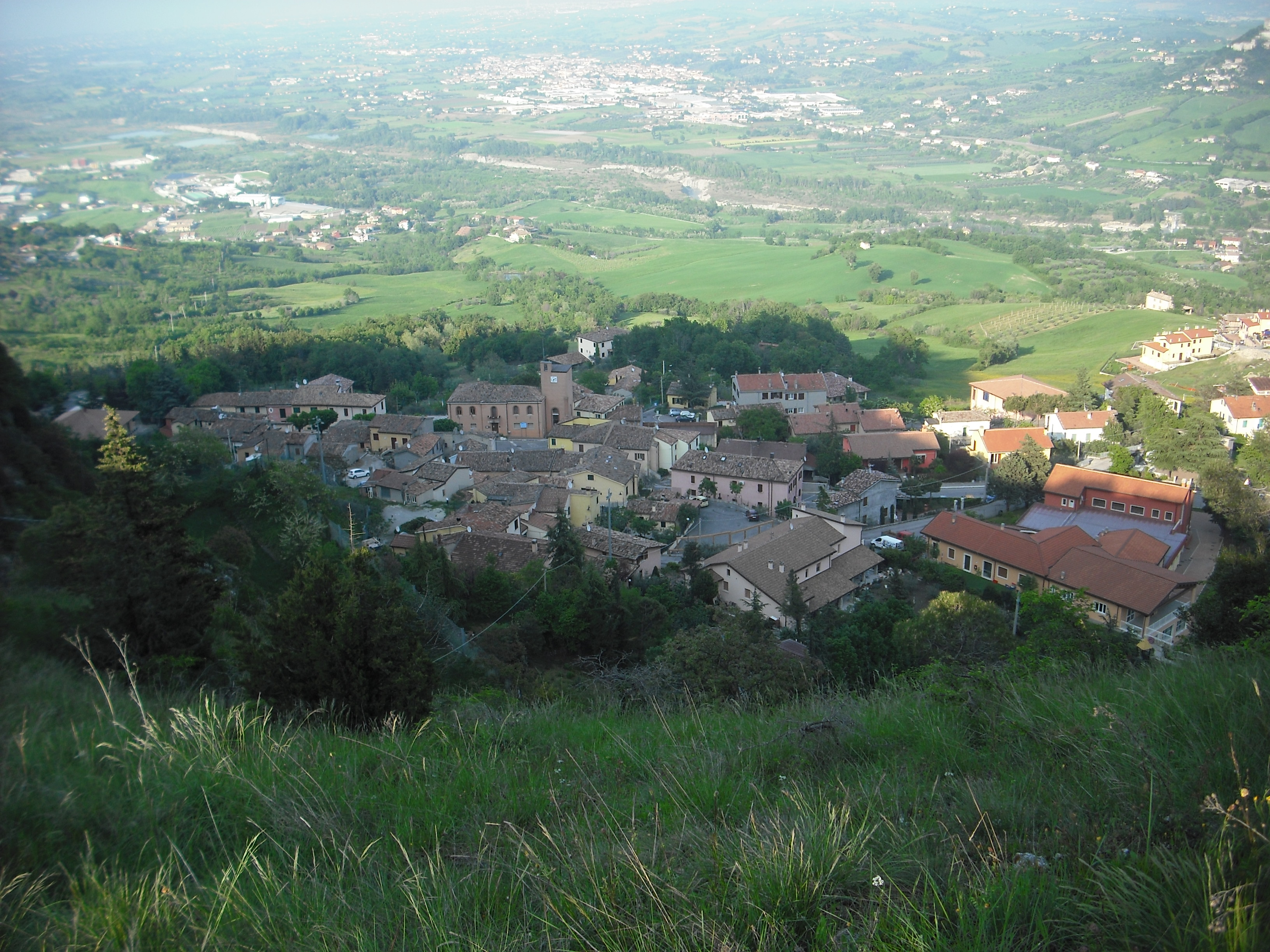

- Location within Italy Location within Emilia-Romagna
- Coordinates: 43°59′06″N 12°23′08″E
- Country: Italy
- Region: Emilia-Romagna
- Province: Province of Rimini (RN)

Area
  - Total: 23.1 km^{2} (8.9 sq mi)

Population (Dec. 2004)
  - Total: 1,312
  - Density: 56.8/km^{2} (147/sq mi)
- Time zone: UTC+1 (CET)
  - Summer (DST): UTC+2 (CEST)
- Postal code: 47030
- Dialing code: 0541

Torriana is a frazione and former comune (municipality) in the Province of Rimini in the Italian region Emilia-Romagna, located about 100 kilometres (62 mi) southeast of Bologna and about 15 kilometres (9 mi) southwest of Rimini. As of 31 December 2004, it had a population of 1,312 and an area of 23.1 square kilometres (8.9 mi^{2}).

Torriana borders the following municipalities: Borghi, Novafeltria, Poggio Berni, San Leo, Sogliano al Rubicone, Verucchio.

On January 1, 2014, Torriana merged with Poggio Berni, forming a new municipality called Poggio Torriana

== Demographic evolution ==
Historical population

Year	Pop.	±%
1861	1,440	—
1871	1,551	+7.7%
1881	2,079	+34.0%
1901	1,944	−6.5%
1911	2,071	+6.5%

Year	Pop.	±%
1921	2,172	+4.9%
1931	2,056	−5.3%
1936	2,774	+34.9%
1951	2,014	−27.4%
1961	1,386	−31.2%

Year	Pop.	±%
1971	952	−31.3%
1981	929	−2.4%
1991	1,002	+7.9%
2001	1,174	+17.2%

Source: Data from ISTAT
