= Poggio Torriana =

- Comune
- Comune di Poggio Torriana
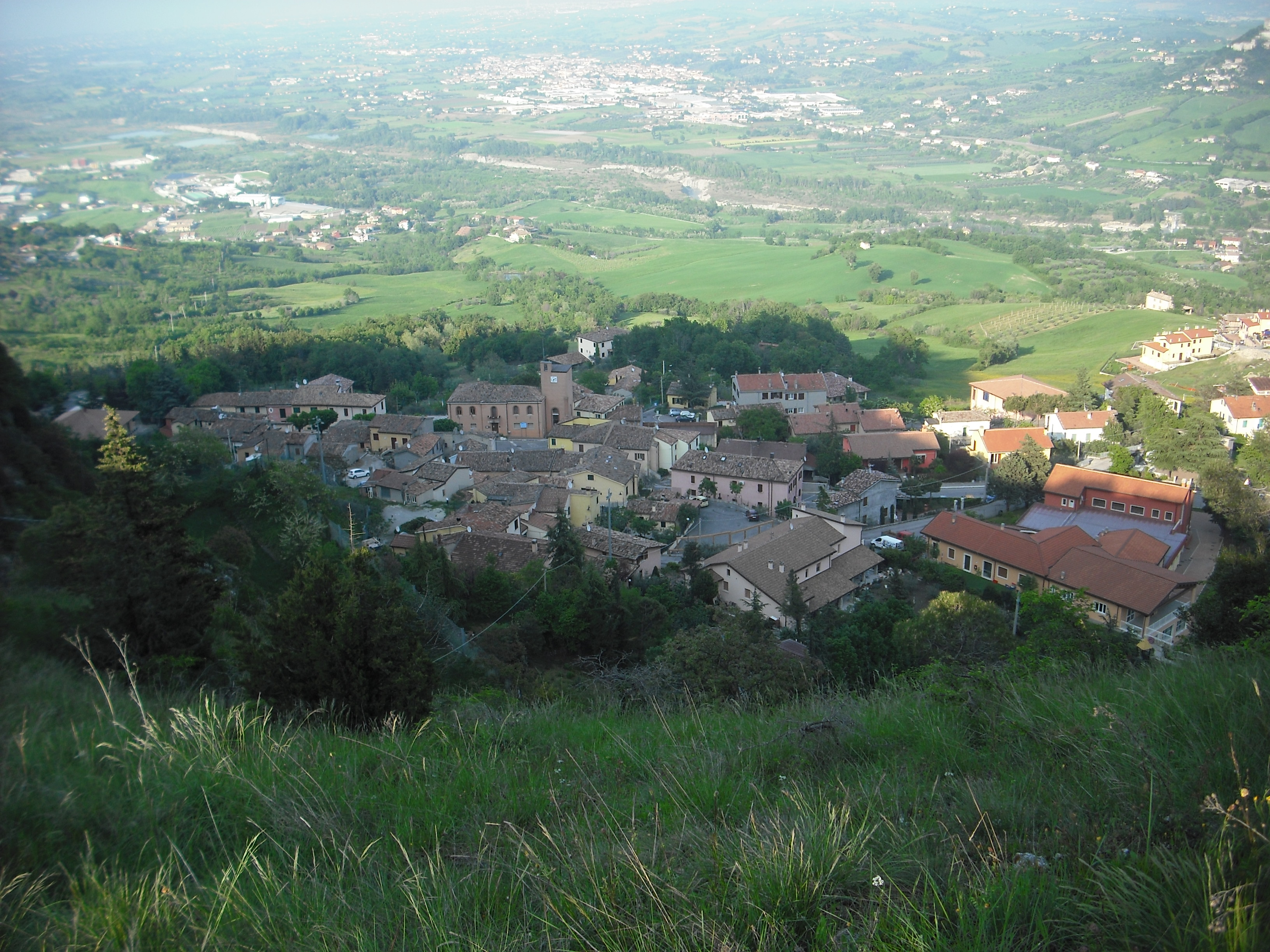
- Frazioni of Torriana

- Location within Italy Location within Emilia-Romagna
- Coordinates: 43°59′N 12°23′E
- Country: Italy
- Region: Emilia-Romagna
- Province: Province of Rimini (RN)

Area
  - Total: 34.74 km^{2} (13.41 sq mi)

Population (2017)
  - Total: 5,123
  - Density: 147.5/km^{2} (381.9/sq mi)
- Time zone: UTC+1 (CET)
  - Summer (DST): UTC+2 (CEST)
- Postal code: 47824
- Dialing code: 0541

Poggio Torriana is a comune (municipality) in the Province of Rimini in the Italian region Emilia-Romagna.

It was formed January 1, 2014 with the merger of municipalities Poggio Berni and Torriana.
