= Compagnia Generale di Elettricità =

Compagnia Generale di Elettricità S.p.A.
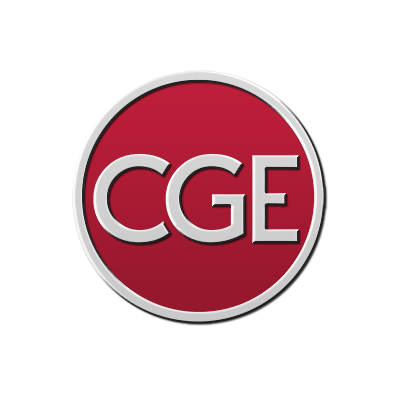
- Type: Joint-stock company
- Industry: Electrical manufacturing
- Founded: 1921; 105 years ago in Milan, Italy
- Defunct: 2000
- Fate: Acquired by IMPulse
- Parent: General Electric (prior to acquisition by IMPulse)

The Compagnia Generale di Elettricità S.p.A. (General Electric Power Company) was an Italian joint-stock company founded in 1921 in Milan. The company was widely known in Italy simply by the acronym CGE, as it was primarily owned and managed by General Electric (widely known as GE), of the United States.

CGE sold a wide variety of productions from electrical applications, simple high-voltage transformers, and generators, to powerplants and engines for trains and trolleybuses. The majority of its manufacturing took place at its European production facilities, although some of its products were actually produced by other companies, such as the RCA Corporations. In the transport sector, CGE was well known for its electrical components that equipped many types of rolling stock, trolley buses, and other railway and locomotive applications. During its active period, CGE competed against two Italian companies: Ansaldo and "Italian Tecnomasio Brown Boveri" (TIBB).

In later life, the company became the EMC traction operating division of Ansaldo Transmissione e Distribuzione S.r.l.. CGE was ultimately integrated into IMPulse NC Inc. following its acquisition in 2000.

== History ==
The Compagnia Generale di Elettricità (CGE) was founded in Milan during 1921; at the time of its creation, ownership was divided between the American industrial conglomerate General Electric (GE), which held a 49.2 percent stake, FIAT had a 36.9 percent and Ercole Marelli owned the remaining 13 percent.

Initial undertakings by CGE included the marketing of the radio receivers of the RCA Corporation. During the late 1920s, the firm started to manufacture its own radio sets. CHE expanded rapidly throughout the interwar period, maintaining its focus on the radio market throughout the 1930s. During 1941, CGE acquired the competing firm FAR (formerly SAFAR) and established Fabbrica Italiana Apparecchi Radio (FIAR). The company also built two additional factories located in Milan and Baranzate, one was involving in the construction of radio and navigation equipment, as well as components related to the production of radio sets, while the second facility was dedicated to the production of radio sets. Production was halted on account of Italy's declining military position in the Second World War.

Months after the end of the conflict, GCE was able to restart production; furthermore, the company's product range was extended into domestic appliances and television sets. In 1946, the majority of manufacturing activity related to televisions was transferred to the Baranzate factory, which was rebranded as the Italian Radio and Television Factory (FIRT). Two years later, CGE's FIAR facility in Milan became focused on the production of radio transceivers for the Italian Army. During the early years of the Cold War, CGE occasionally made business deals with countries within the Eastern Bloc; its transactions in this region were monitored by the Central Intelligence Agency. By the start of 1958, CGE's ownership was split 50/50 between GE and the Italian industrial firm Fiat. Furthermore, CGE held a 50 percent stake in the Naples-based Compagnia Napolitana Elettrici (CONE), which primarily produced refrigerators and water heaters.

During 1958, CGE acquired the brand of the bankrupt radio manufacturer Unda. During 1961, the firm commenced production of radar sets that were used in both aeronautical and naval fields.

In 1966, General Electric increased its ownership of CGE, purchasing shared from Fiat to increase its stake to 80 percent. Thereafter, considerable consolidation took place; in 1966, CGE's electrical production interests were merged into Ansaldo-San Giorgio. One year later, the consumer electronics division of subsidiary FIAR was divested to the German electrical equipment manufacturer AEG-Telefunken, which took over the Baranzate plant along with the production of CGE-branded radios and televisions. Shortly thereafter, FIAR and CGE merged.

In 1973, CGE took over and absorbed the electronic instrumentation manufacturer Telemeccanica Elettrica Officine Meccaniche Riunite S.p.A. (TEOMR) from Pirelli. Two years later, the company received a contract from the European Space Research Organisation; CGE participated in multiple space-based ventures.

In 1978, the company recorded a turnover of 70 billion lire along with a loss of 4.5 billion lire; it employed 3,427 employees across seven manufacturing sites, four in Milan and three in Turin. During 1986, all production activities ceased and the former company's property was sold to the Municipality of Milan.
