= Leonardo Benevolo =

Italian architect, city planner and architecture historian

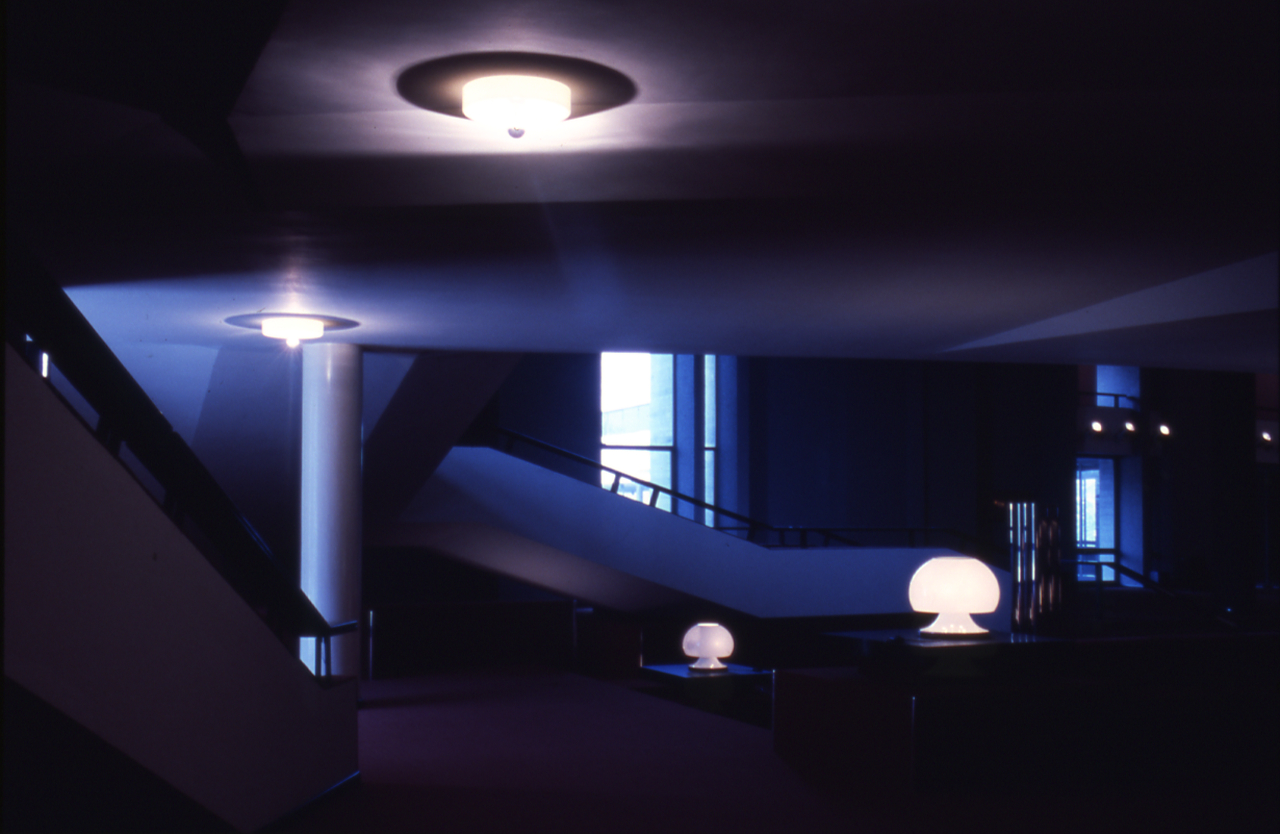
Leonardo Benevolo, with Tommaso Giura Longo and Carlo Melograni: Palazzo degli Affari e della Borsa, Bologna. Interior. Photo by Paolo Monti, 1976.

Leonardo Benevolo (25 September 1923 – 5 January 2017) was an Italian architect, city planner and architecture historian. Born in Orta San Giulio, Italy, Benevolo studied architecture in Rome where he graduated in 1946. Later taught history of architecture in Rome, Florence, Venice and Palermo. His book Storia dell'archittetura moderna (History of Modern Architecture) first published in 1960 has been reprinted 18 times, as of 1996, and translated into six other languages. Benevolo developed the concept of ‘neo-conservative’ city which became an important contribution to the understanding of cities’ evolution.

== Writings ==
- 1967 The origins of Modern Town Planning, MIT Press
- 1977 History of Modern Architecture, MIT Press
- 1980 The History of the City, MIT Press
- 1995 The European City, Wiley-Blackwell
