= Modena railway station =

Railway station in Modena, Italy

Modena
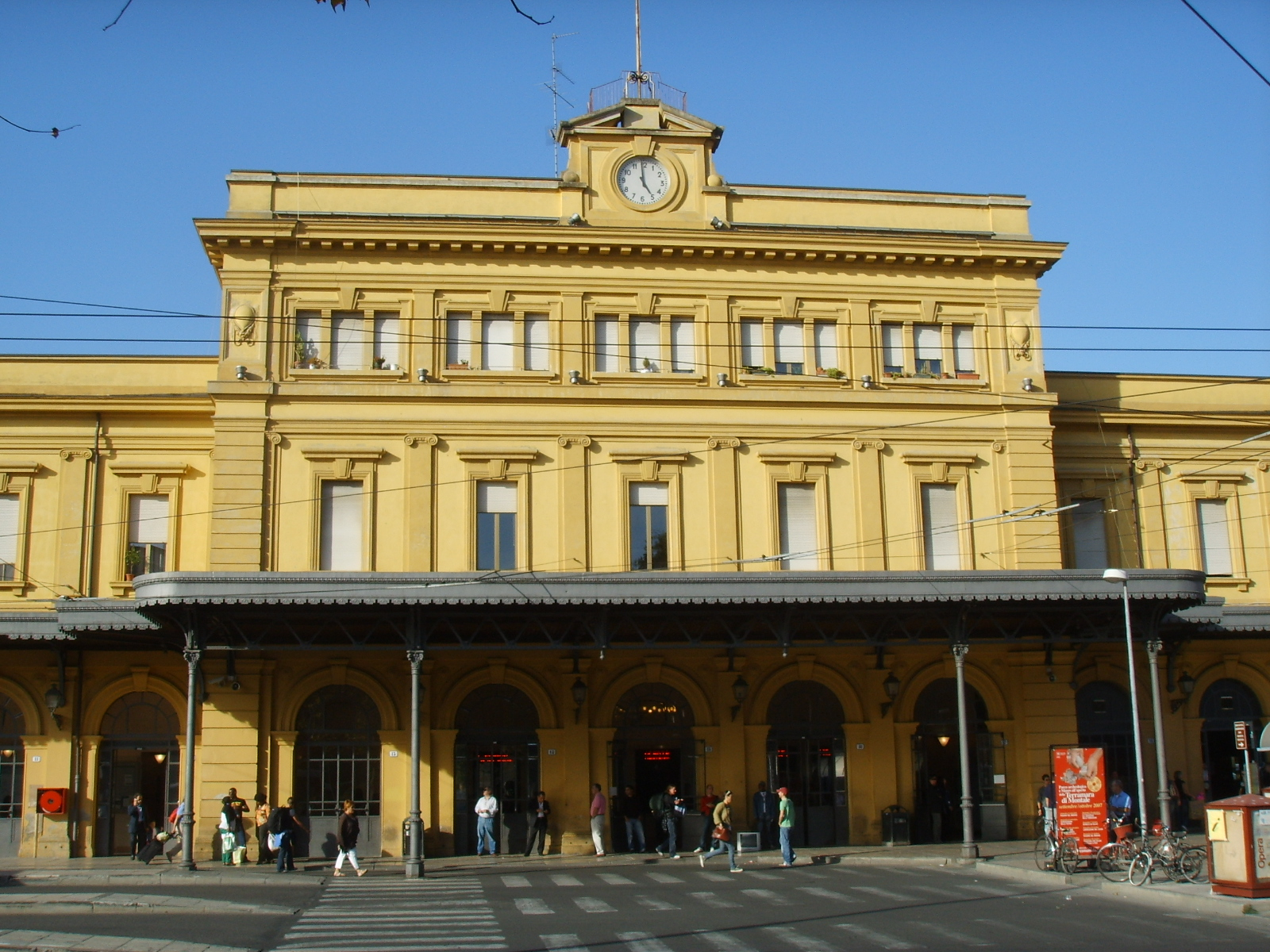
- The passenger building.

General information
- Location: Piazza Dante Alighieri; 41122 Modena MO; Modena, Modena, Emilia-Romagna; Italy
- Coordinates: 44°39′14″N 10°55′50″E
- Operator: Rete Ferroviaria Italiana; Centostazioni
- Lines: Milano–Bologna; Verona–Modena; Modena–Sassuolo
- Distance: 36.932 km (22.948 mi) from Bologna Centrale
- Train operators: Trenitalia; Ferrovie Emilia Romagna
- Connections: Modena buses, Modena trolleybuses and suburban buses

Other information
- Classification: Gold

History
- Opened: 21 July 1859; 167 years ago
- Electrified: 1938

Services
| Preceding station | Trenitalia | Following station |
|---|---|---|
| Reggio Emilia towards Milano Centrale | InterCity Notte; Milan–Syracuse | Bologna Centrale towards Siracusa |
Location
- Location within Emilia-Romagna Location within Northern Italy Location within Italy

Modena railway station (Italian: Stazione di Modena) is a railway station serving the city of Modena, in the region of Emilia-Romagna, northern Italy. The station opened in 1859 and is located on the Milan–Bologna railway, Verona–Modena railway and Modena–Sassuolo railway. The train services are operated by Trenitalia and Ferrovie Emilia Romagna.

The station is currently managed by Rete Ferroviaria Italiana (RFI). However, the commercial area of the passenger building is managed by Centostazioni. Each of these companies is a subsidiary of Ferrovie dello Stato (FS), Italy's state-owned rail company.

== Location ==
Modena railway station is situated at Piazza Dante Alighieri, to the north of the city centre.

== History ==
The station was opened on 21 July 1859, together with the rest of the Piacenza–Bologna section of the Milan–Bologna railway.

== Features ==
=== Passenger building ===
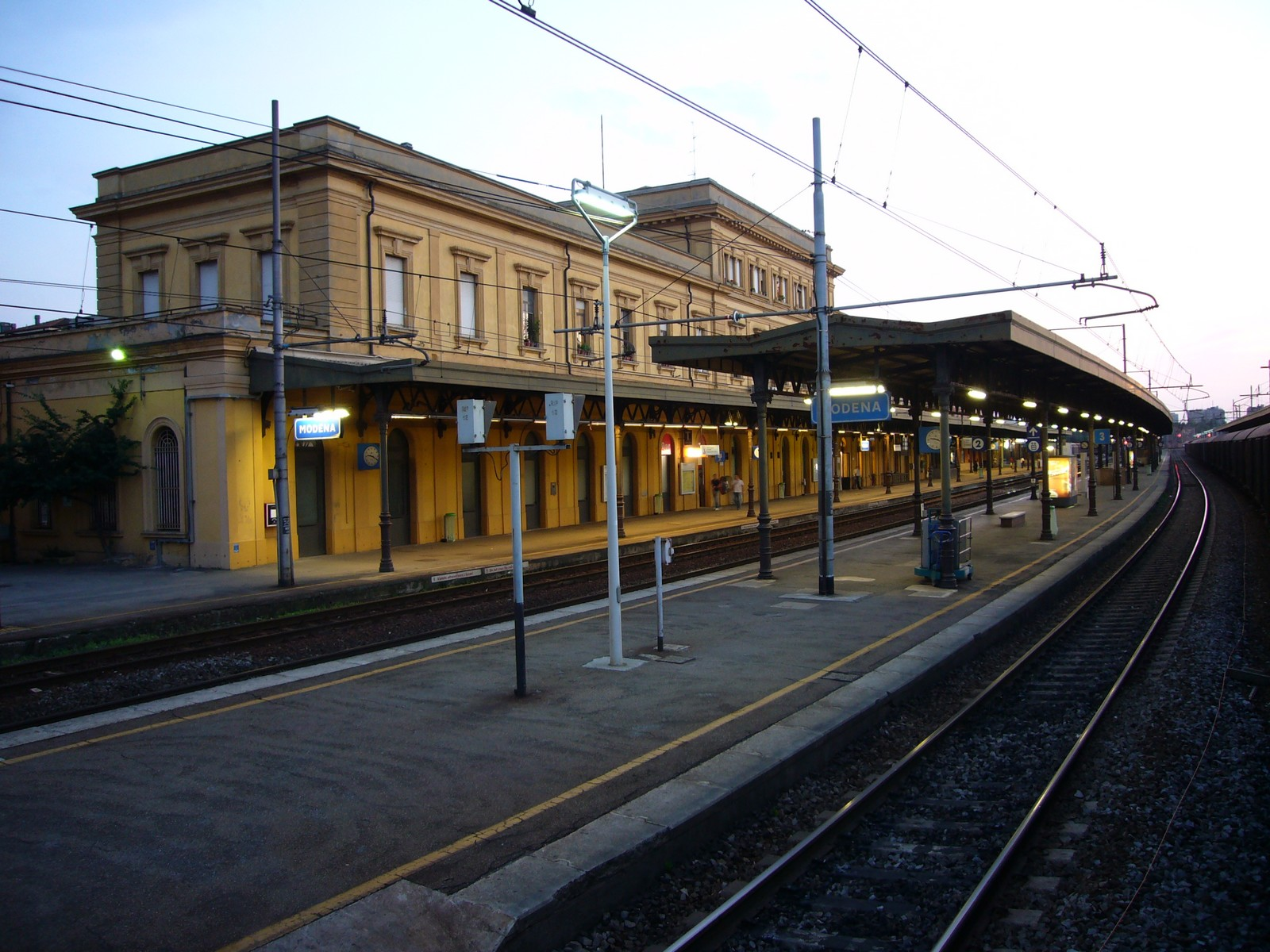
Platform side of the passenger building.

The passenger building is not the original structure dating from when the station began operations. That building was demolished and rebuilt in 1920.

The present passenger building is rectangular in shape and is made of brick. It is painted yellow, and consists of three parts. The central part is spread over three floors, with access provided through five arches on each side of the building. On the first floor of this part, there are many rectangular mullioned windows decorated with a cornice.

The two lateral parts of the building extend symmetrically from the central body. They are on two levels, with seven arches at ground floor level, and many windows (similar to those of the central body) at first floor level.

The entrances of all three parts of the building are protected from the weather by a wrought iron canopy, both on the front side and the platform side.

=== Renovations ===
Between 2005 and 2006, the station was the subject of extensive renovations commissioned by Centostazioni, with co-financing from RFI. The total expenditure on the renovations was €700,000.

The renovation work included maintenance of the exterior facade of the passenger building, the shelter and pedestrian underpass, upgrading of technological systems, construction of a new basement, the renovation of public conveniences, and renewal of lighting both internally and externally.

Also included in the renovation project was the construction of new commercial premises, such as a Chef Express bar and a McDonald's. These two areas alone have about 40 employees, a turnover of €2.5 million, around 500,000 customers per year, and two rental areas of 360 sqm, offering a total of about 130 seats.

=== Station yard ===
The station yard has seven tracks, including five through tracks equipped with platforms:

- Track 1 is a loop siding, used for any overtaking of even numbered trains.
- Track 2 is one of the main lines, used for even numbered stopping Trenitalia trains.
- Track 3 is the other main line, used for odd numbered stopping Trenitalia trains.
- Track 4 is a loop siding, used for any overtaking of odd numbered trains.
- Track 5 is used by trains terminating in Modena.
- Tracks 6 and 7 are used by Ferrovie Emilia Romagna trains operating on the Modena–Sassuolo line.

All tracks have a platform sheltered by a canopy, and connected with the other platforms by the pedestrian underpass.

There are other tracks used for storage of the machinery used for line maintenance, and also a repair shop.

== Train services ==
The station is served by the following service(s):

- High speed services (Frecciarossa) Milan - Parma - Bologna - Florence - Rome
- High speed services (Frecciabianca) Milan - Parma - Bologna - Ancona - Pescara - Foggia - Bari - Brindisi - Lecce
- High speed services (Frecciabianca) Milan - Parma - Bologna - Ancona - Pescara - Foggia - Bari - Taranto
- High speed services (Frecciabianca) Turin - Parma - Bologna - Ancona - Pescara - Foggia - Bari - Brindisi - Lecce
- Intercity services Milan - Parma - Bologna - Florence - Rome - Naples - Salerno - Lamezia Termi - Reggio Calabria
- Intercity services Milan - Parma - Bologna - Rimini - Ancona - Pescara - Foggia - Bari - Brindisi - Lecce
- Intercity services Milan - Parma - Bologna - Rimini - Ancona - Pescara - Foggia - Bari - Taranto
- Night train (Intercity Notte) Turin - Milan - Parma - Reggio Emilia - Florence - Rome - Salerno - Lamezia Terme - Reggio di Calabria
- Night train (Intercity Notte) Milan - Parma - Bolgona - Ancona - Pescara - Foggia - Bari - Brindisi - Lecce
- Express services (Regionale Veloce) Piacenza - Parma - Reggio Emilia - Bologna - Rimini - Ancona
- Express services (Regionale Veloce) Milan - Piacenza - Parma - Reggio Emilia - Bolgona (- Rimini)
- Regional services (Treno regionale) Parma - Reggio Emilia - Modena - Bologna
- Local services (Treno regionale) Mantova - Suzzara - Carpi - Modena
- Local services (Treno regionale) Sassuolo - Modena

== Passenger and train movements ==
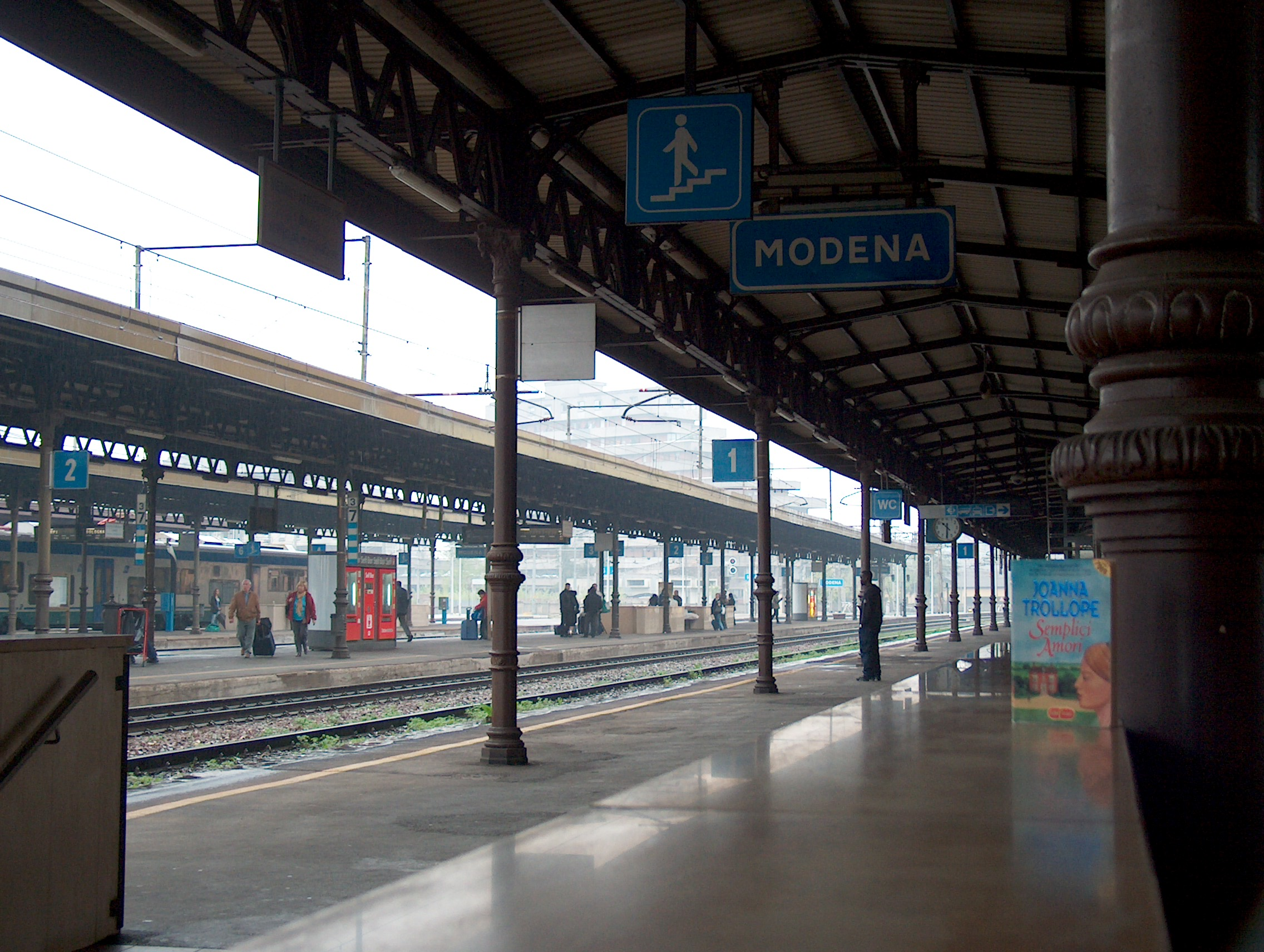
View of the main platform.

The station has about 6.5 million passenger movements each year.

The passenger trains calling at the station include regional, express, InterCity, InterCity Night, Frecciabianca services, and a daily pair of Frecciarossa high speed trains.

A total of about 257 passenger trains serve the station each day. Their main destinations are Piacenza, Suzzara and Bologna Centrale.

== See also ==
- Modena Piazza Manzoni railway station
- History of rail transport in Italy
- List of railway stations in Emilia-Romagna
- Rail transport in Italy
- Railway stations in Italy
- Bologna metropolitan railway service
