= Autodromo (company) =

Defunct Italian bus manufacturer

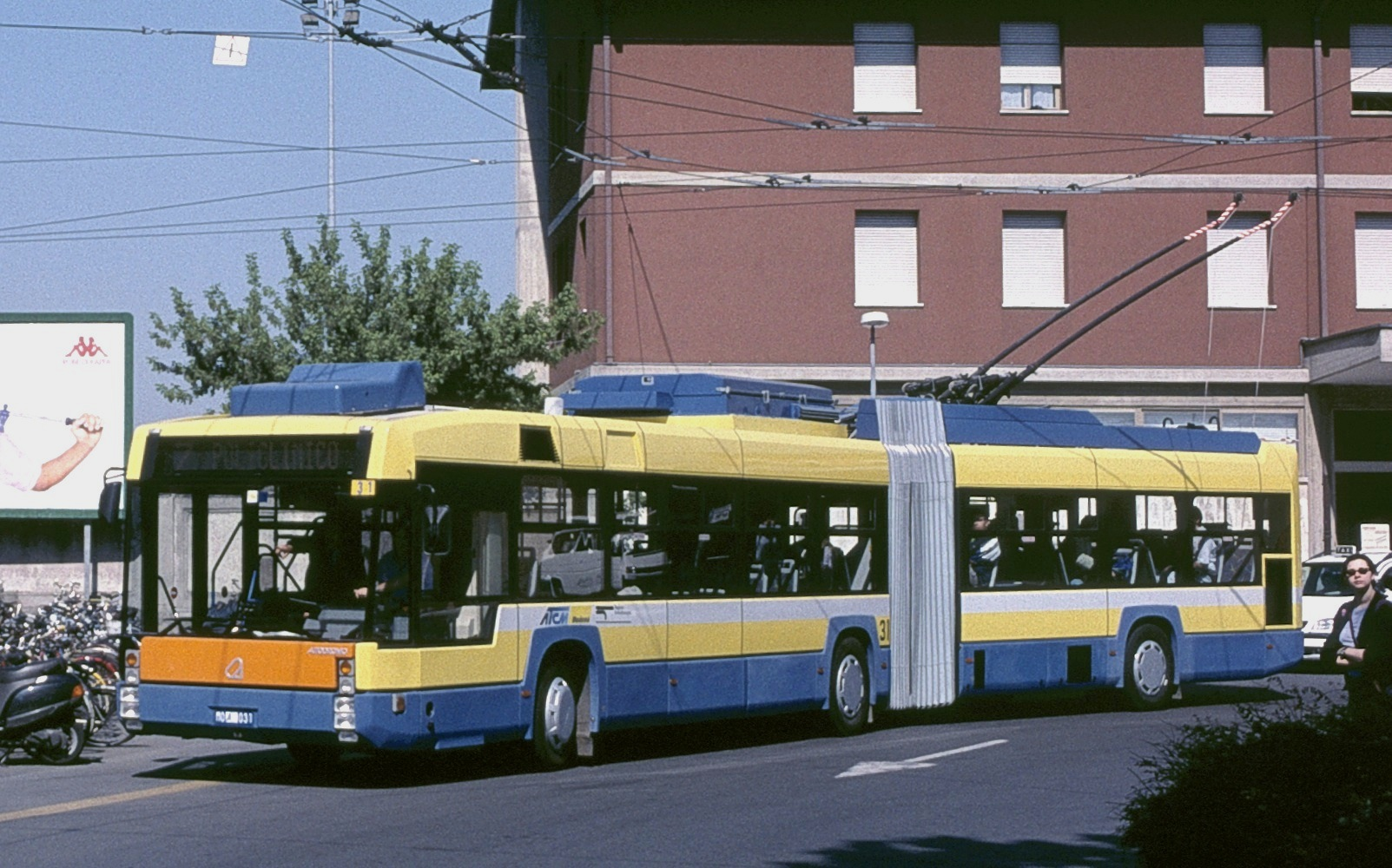
- An Autodromo trolleybus in Modena in 2000, when newly in service
- Type: Società a responsabilità limitata (S.r.l.)
- Industry: Transport manufacturing
- Founded: 1949
- Defunct: 2004
- Fate: Dissolved
- Headquarters: Modena, Italy
- Products: Racing cars (early years only); Buses; Trolleybuses
- Number of employees: 103 (October 2003)

Carrozzeria Autodromo Modena (Autodromo Coachworks, Modena), commonly known as Autodromo or CAM, was an Italian coachbuilder of buses and trolleybuses that was based in Modena, Italy, which in its early years produced a few race car bodies before concentrating on bodies for commercial vehicles. At one time, Autodromo was one of the best-known Italian bus manufacturers. It was in business from 1949 to 2004. In the 1990s, in partnership with MAN Nutzfahrzeuge AG of Germany, Autodromo built some of the first low-floor buses and trolleybuses for the Italian market.

== History ==
The company, initially organised as a cooperative, was founded in 1949 in Modena under the name Cooperativa Carrozzai Modenesi. In the very first year, its legal form was converted into a limited company (Società a responsabilità limitata); at the same time, the company was renamed Carrozzeria Autodromo Modena. The new name referred to the Aerautodromo di Modena race track, which was under construction at the time and in whose immediate vicinity the company's factory was located. The company logo incorporated a stylised race track. For a time, Carrozzeria Autodromo Modena used the abbreviation CAM as its brand name.

In its early years, Autodromo was purely an automobile repair shop. The transition to a body manufacturer took place gradually. In the 1950s, Autodromo initially produced a few bodies for racing cars. Its products were mostly barchettas (the plural form in Italian is barchette), common Italian slang for open-top cars with only one or two seats. However, the company was unable to establish itself permanently as a body manufacturer in the sports-car sector. It subsequently shifted its focus to the construction of commercial vehicle and bus bodies. The company remained independent over the decades and was not part of any major corporation.

From the late 1990s, Autodromo, like many of its competitors, struggled with economic difficulties. The reason is generally cited as the decline in bus sales in Italy, which was attributed to the unwillingness of local authorities to renew their bus fleets. In 2003, Autodromo ceased operations and filed for bankruptcy. During the insolvency proceedings, in spring 2004, the German bus manufacturer Göppel Bus considered taking over the Italian plant, but ultimately decided against doing so.

== Vehicles built ==
=== Racing car bodies ===
==== Ferrari 166MM ====
Among the most famous sports cars associated with Autodromo is a spyder from the series Ferrari 166 MM (chassis number 0272M) from 1953, which remained a unique example in this form. The origin of its bodywork is not clearly established; some consider the origin of the car a "mystery." Many historians of the brand have concluded that the body originated with a design by Ferrari engineer Aurelio Lampredi and that Ferrari manufactured the basic structure of the body in its own factory, after which Autodromo subsequently implemented the details or "refined" the structure. This would make the Spyder one of very few vehicles whose bodywork was built by Ferrari itself. However, Autodromo's involvement is occasionally questioned.

==== Ferrari 735 S Spyder ====
Also in 1953, Autodromo built a body for a Ferrari 735 S Spyder, one of the few Ferrari racing cars with a four-cylinder engine. Ferrari built a total of three 735 S cars. One chassis received a body by Pininfarina, the second a body by Scagiletti, while the third chassis (chassis number 0428M 53) was fitted with a body by Autodromo. As with the 166MM with chassis number 0272M, the body design of the Autodromo example is attributed to Aurelio Lampredi. The car with the Autodromo body was destroyed in a wreck while being driven by Alberto Ascari during its first outing in the 1953 Italian Grand Prix held at the Monza Circuit. The chassis received a new body by Scaglietti that same year.

==== OSCA ====
In subsequent years, Autodromo made bodies for some Officine Specializzate Costruzione Automobili (OSCA) chassis.

=== Buses ===
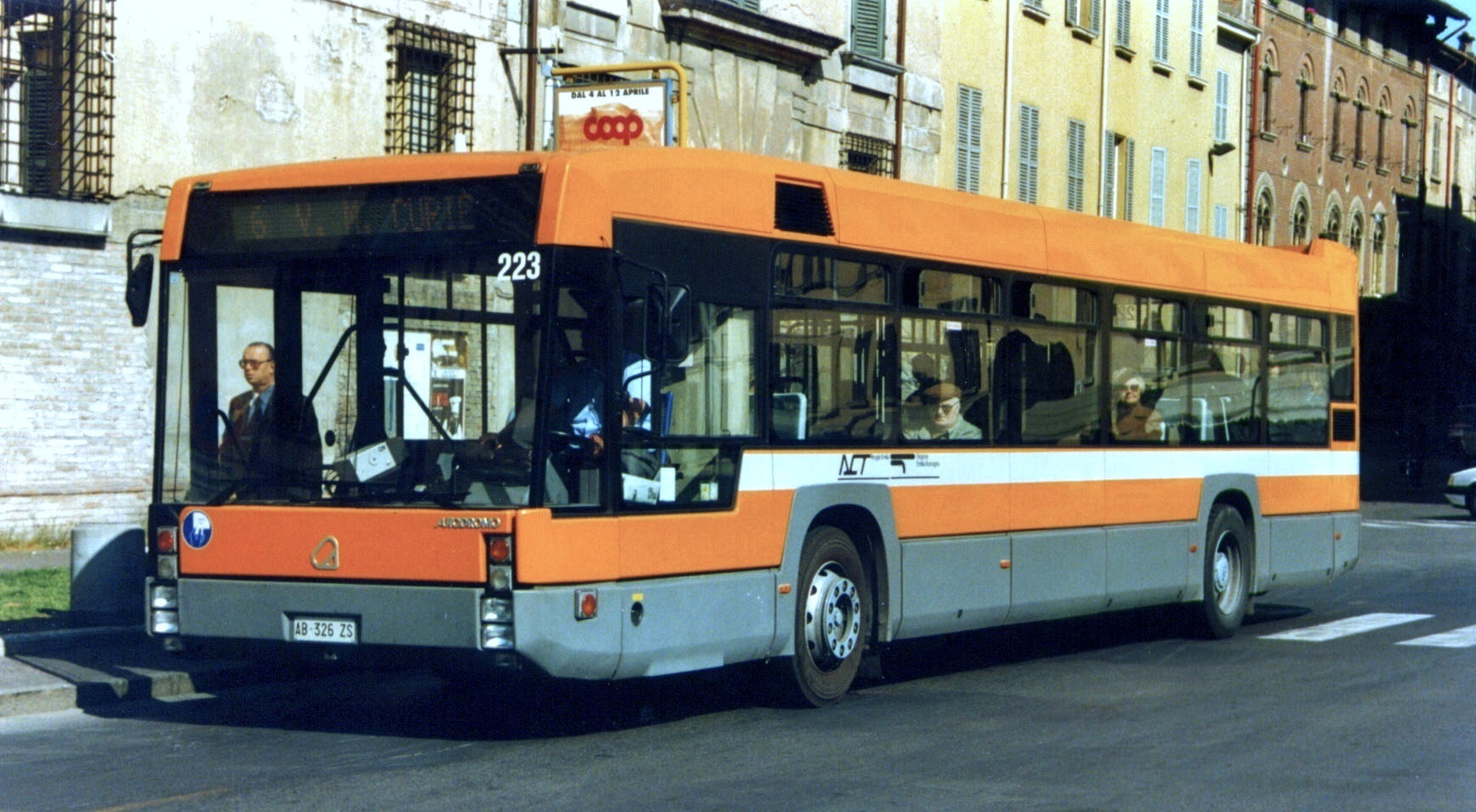
An Autodromo "BusOtto 12" low-floor diesel bus in Reggio Emilia in 1997

From the 1960s onward, Autodromo primarily built bus bodies. Although the chassis were supplied by other builders, Autodromo constructed the bodies and usually completed the assembly of each bus. Autodromo's vehicles were primarily intended for use as regular buses in urban transport, rather than as coaches (long-distance buses).

In the 1990s, Autodromo built a series of buses with low-floor technology using chassis by MAN Nutzfahrzeuge AG, and the trolleybus version constituted the first low-floor trolleybuses to be built in Italy. A collaboration between MAN and Autodromo for transit buses began in 1992. By October 1999, 600 low-floor buses and trolleybuses built by the Italian company on MAN chassis had been sold to transport companies in Italy, equating to an approximate 20% market share. In 2000, the two companies agreed to expand their relationship, to promote the sales of each other's buses in their respective markets, along with their own buses.

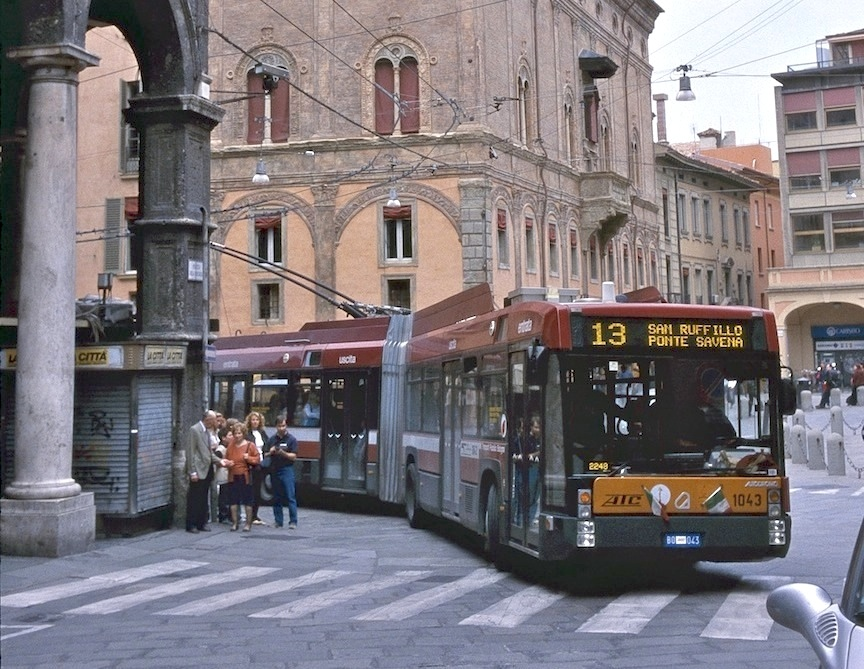
An articulated Autodromo trolleybus in Bologna in 2003

The first trolleybus orders were received in 1995, from the Bologna trolleybus system and the Parma trolleybus system. Bologna ordered from Autodromo 20 low-floor, articulated trolleybuses with MAN chassis, which were built in 1996–1997, while Parma ordered eight two-axle trolleybuses, which were delivered in 1997–1998. Bologna purchased 15 more of the same model in 1999, and Parma six more in 1999. Meanwhile, the Milan trolleybus system purchased eight Autodromo/MAN articulated trolleybuses in 1997, and the Modena trolleybus system purchased 10 eight articulated vehicles, receiving them in 1999–2000. Several of Modena's articulated and Parma's two-axle vehicles were still in service in 2024.

All of the company's trolleybuses were from its "BusOtto"^{IT} line, which also included motorbuses. Model "BusOtto 12" was for two-axle (12 m) vehicles and "BusOtto 18" for articulated (18 m) vehicles. The name was a play on words, to reflect the use of German-built low-floor MAN chassis in the BusOtto model. It was a portmanteau of the word bus with bassotto, the Italian name for Dachshund, a dog breed whose name is of German origin and whose short legs place its body lower to the ground, and also clearly incorporating (through the use of camel case) the Germanic name Otto. (Another bus manufacturer, Solaris of Poland, uses a dachshund as its mascot, but it is unclear which usage occurred first.) Parma was the only buyer of the trolleybus version of the BusOtto 12 model in Italy, but a single, prototype two-axle trolleybus built in Romania also had a BusOtto body.

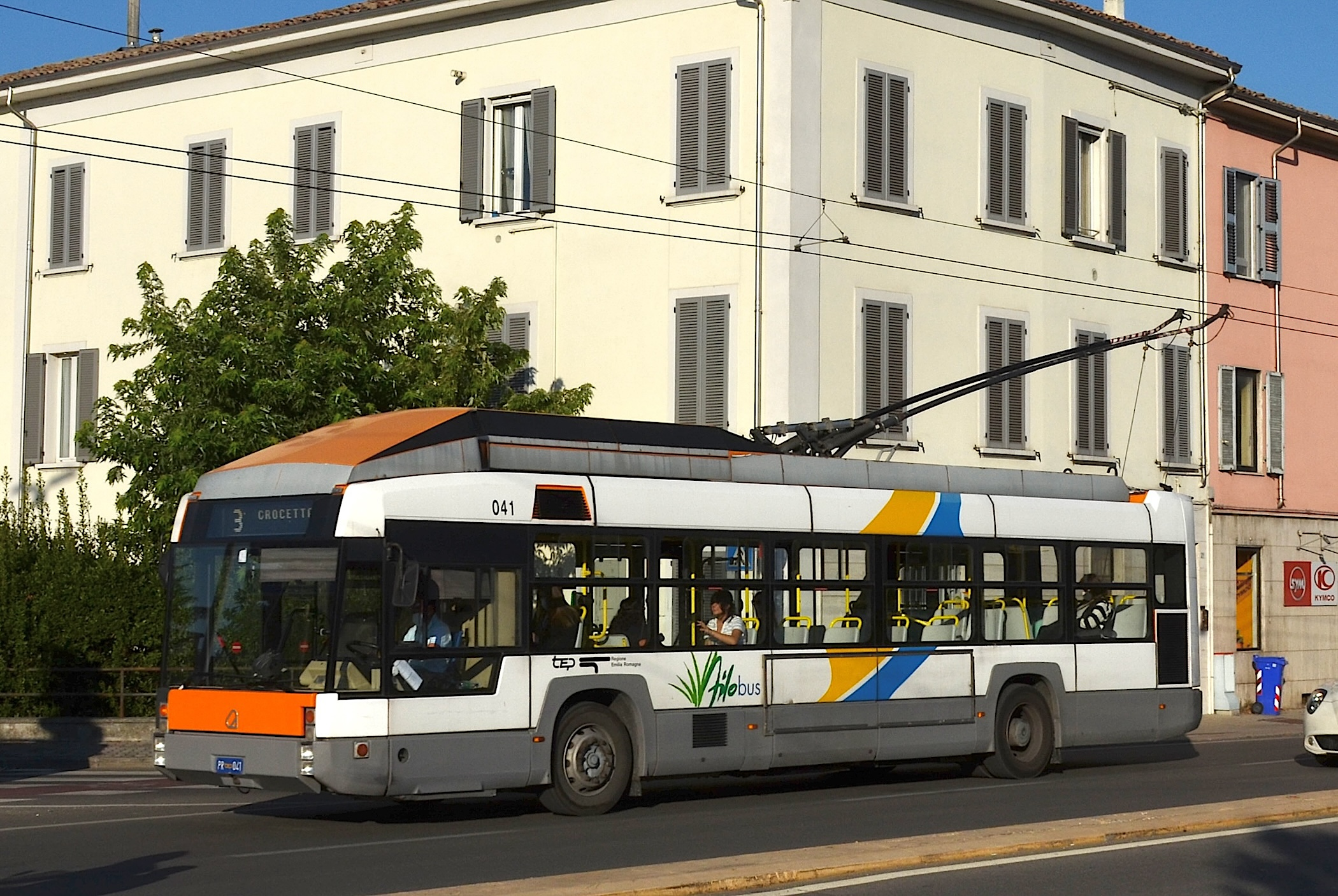
Parma was the only Italian system that purchased two-axle trolleybuses from Autodromo.

In the early 1990s, Autodromo formed a partnership with Rocar, a bus manufacturer in Romania, under which Rocar would build buses and trolleybuses using Autodromo body designs under licence, on low-floor MAN chassis. Ultimately, only two vehicles were built, one motorbus and one trolleybus, before Rocar entered insolvency, in 2002. Designated as Rocar model 812E, the solitary trolleybus was built in 1998 and was originally a demonstrator, owned by Rocar. After Rocar went out of business, the trolleybus was sold to Regia Autonomă de Transport București (RATB), the operator of the Bucharest trolleybus system, in a liquidation sale, but it had already been a member of RATB's fleet since at least 2000, entering service that year with fleet number 7460. The single Rocar/Autodromo diesel bus, two-axle Rocar model 812U,^{RO} was also acquired by RATB, in whose fleet it carried number 98.

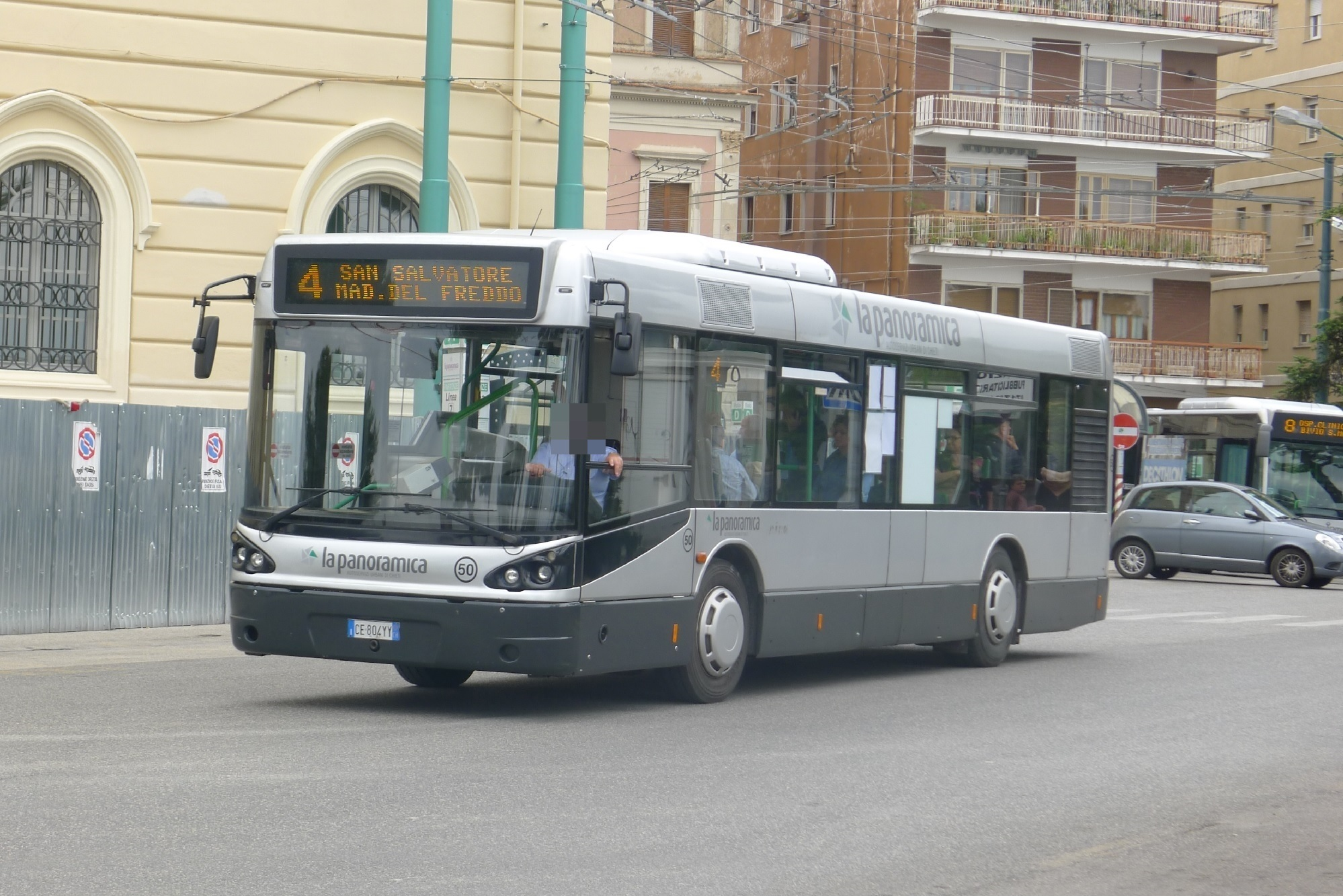
A Tango midibus in Chieti, 2016

In addition to trolleybuses, Autodromo built motorbuses for numerous Italian cities. Along with the "BusOtto", which used chassis by MAN, bus and minibus models included:

- 177, a city bus on a 12-metre (40 ft) Siccar chassis
- 180T, an interurban coach on a Fiat 370 chassis
- "Alè",^{IT} a 7.57-metre (24.8 ft) midibus with MAN components
- "Alice",^{IT} a 12-metre or 10.5-metre bus on a Siccar chassis
- "Bussola", a minibus on an Iveco 70.14 chassis
- "Pollicino",^{IT} a minibus on an Iveco Daily chassis, introduced in 1987
- "Tango",^{IT} a 9.74-metre (32.0 ft) midibus on an MAN chassis, introduced in 2001

The company also supplied bodies for MAN model NG 313 buses.

In 2001, Autodromo signed a cooperation agreement with Volvo Buses, in which Autodromo was to convert Volvo's buses produced in Poland to meet the requirements of the Italian market. It involved Autodromo buying chassis from Volvo and completing them as buses in Italy. With the establishment of this new agreement, the cooperation agreement between Autodromo and MAN Nutzfahrzeuge was ended.

== See also ==
- List of trolleybus manufacturers (current and former trolleybus manufacturers)
