= Trolleybuses in Milan =

Trolleybus system in Milan, Italy

Milan trolleybus system
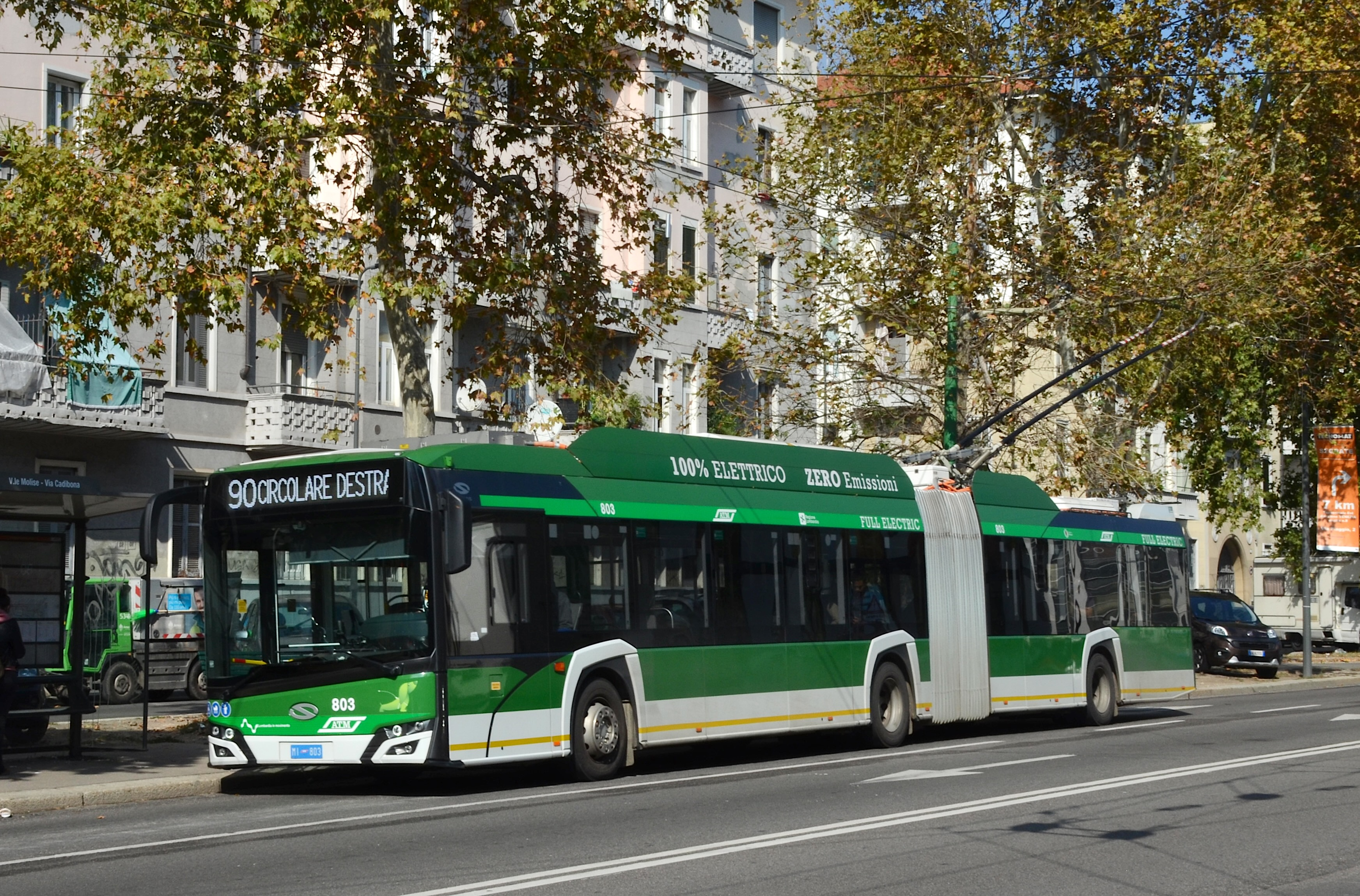
- A Solaris Trollino articulated trolleybus on route 90 in 2022

Operation
- Locale: Milan, Lombardy, Italy
- Open: 28 October 1933
- Status: In service
- Routes: 4
- Owner: Comune di Milano
- Operator: ATM

Infrastructure
- Electrification: 550-600 V DC parallel overhead lines etc
- Depots: Via Molise, Via Novara
- Stock: 135

Statistics
- Route length: 40.4 km (25.1 mi)
Overview
- Website: http://www.atm-mi.it/ ATM (in Italian)

The Milan trolleybus system (Italian: Rete filoviaria di Milano) is part of the public transport network of Milan, Italy. In operation since 1933, the system presently comprises four routes. It is the second-oldest trolleybus system in Europe, after that of Lausanne, and the fifth-oldest in the world.

== History ==
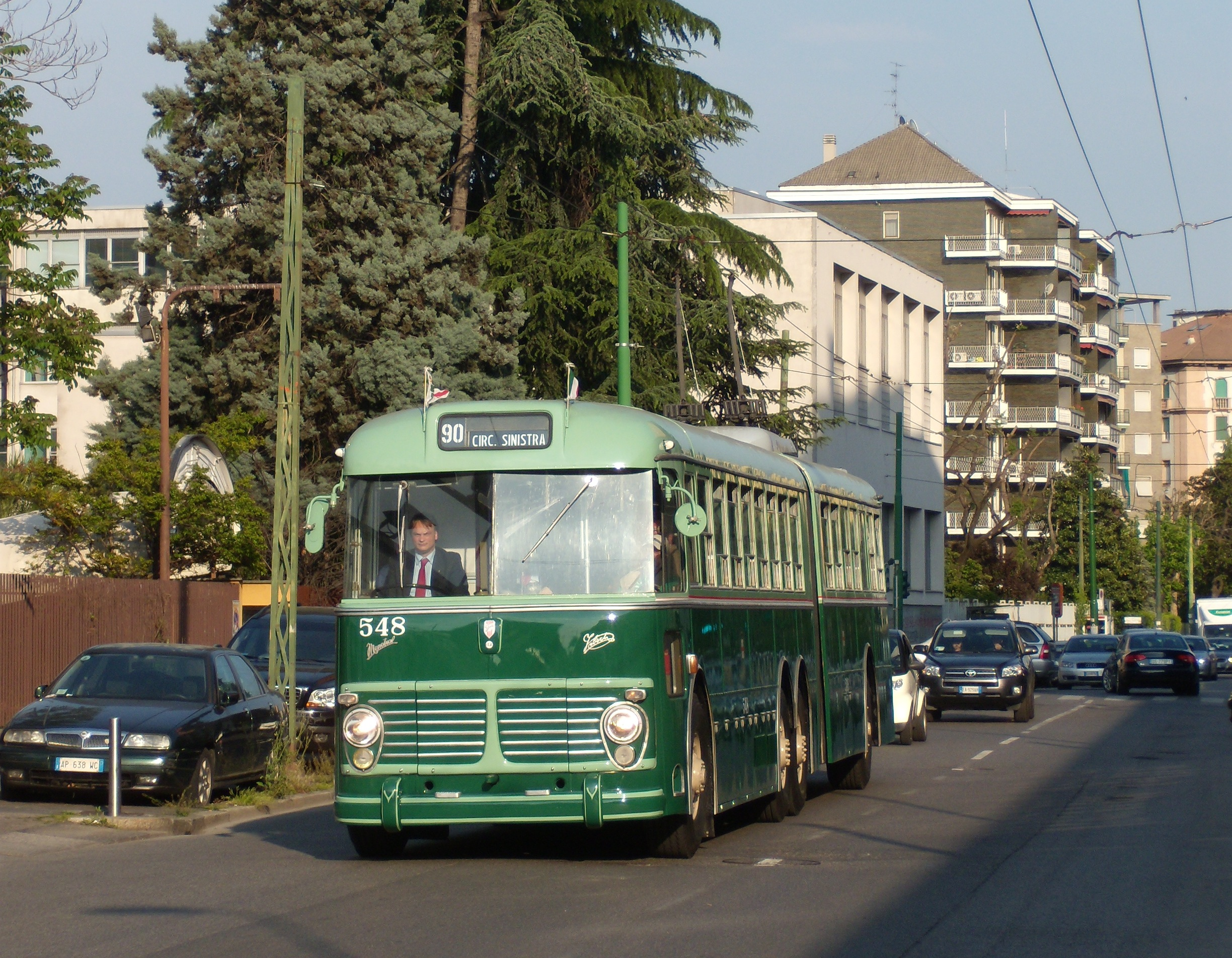
Preserved 1958 Viberti-bodied Fiat no. 548, restored in 2009

The first trolleybuses were introduced in Milan as vehicles operating exclusively within the 1906 Milan International world's fair, at Piazza D'Armi, a plaza which has since been demolished and replaced by the Citylife district. The first proper trolleybus system was established in Milan in 1933, with the opening of the short route 81 (Piazza Spotorno – Piazza Dergano).

In subsequent decades, the system developed rapidly, with the opening of radial and tangential routes. The new external circular route (originally CE (circolare esterna), now 90/91) was built as a trolleybus line.

In the mid-1970s, it was intended to transform the 90/91 circular route into a light rail line, and abandon the rest of the trolleybus network. Many trolleybus routes were therefore converted into bus routes, and their overhead wires were removed.

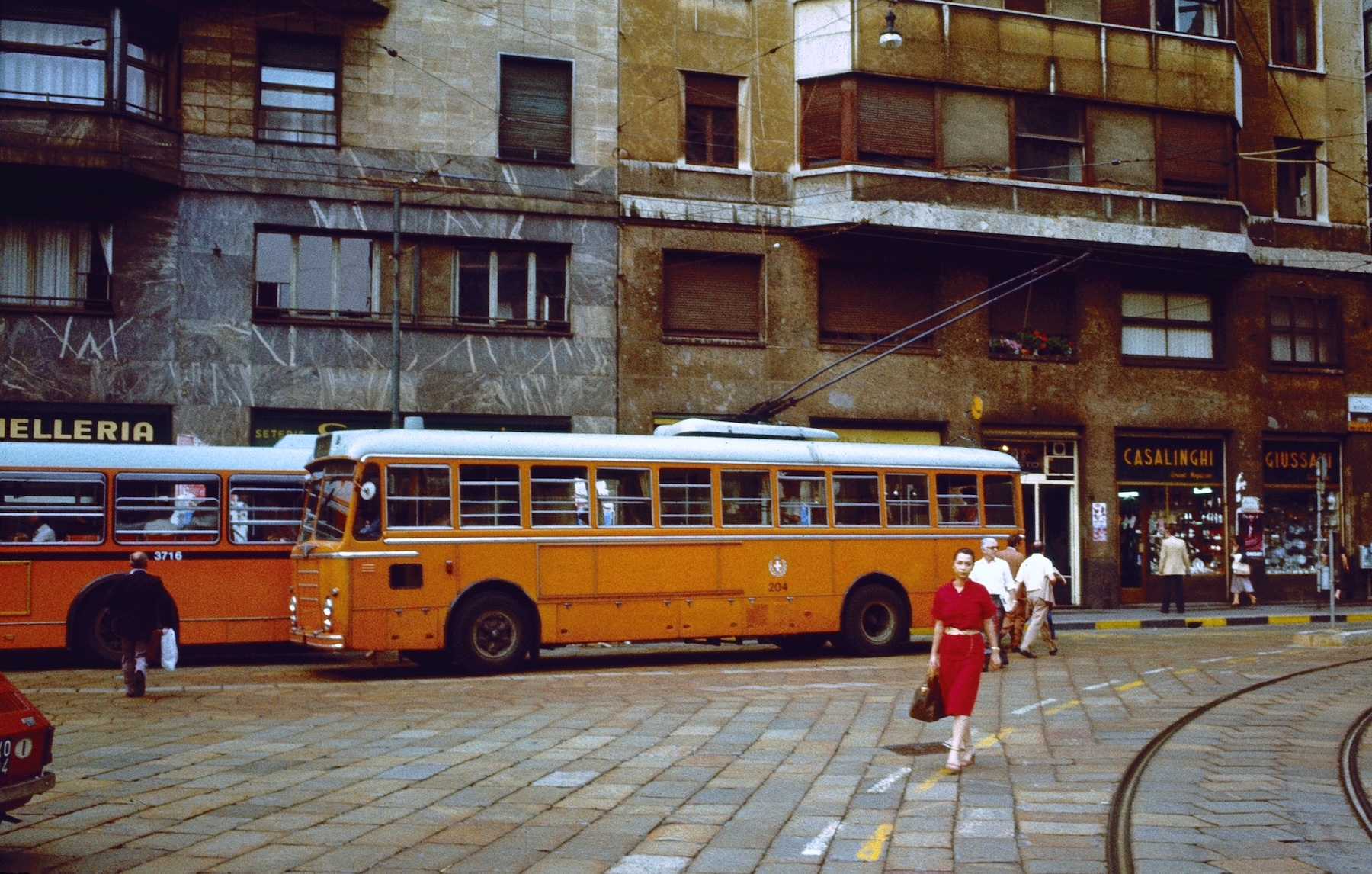
An Alfa Romeo trolleybus on former route 84 in 1980

Routes abandoned during the 1970s and 1980s were:

- 81 and 82 (closed 27 September 1976);
- 83 and MB (closed 25 October 1976);
- 84 (closed 6 February 1984).
- 95 (closed 20 September 1977);
- 96/97 (closed 5 March 1979);

In subsequent years, following the abandonment of the proposal for the 90/91 tram line, there were no more interventions on the system, except for some limited changes to the routes.

Currently, efforts are focused on reducing journey times, with the construction of additional sections of dedicated lanes for trolleybuses. Renewal of the fleet with low-floor trolleybuses was completed in 2024. There are no plans to expand the system.

== Service ==
The four routes are:

- 90 clockwise circle line (Viale Isonzo - Lotto M1 - Viale Isonzo);
- 91 counter-clockwise circle line (Viale Isonzo - Lotto M1 - Viale Isonzo);
- 92 Viale Isonzo - Bovisa FN;
- 93 Viale Omero - Lambrate M2.

== Fleet ==
=== Past fleet ===
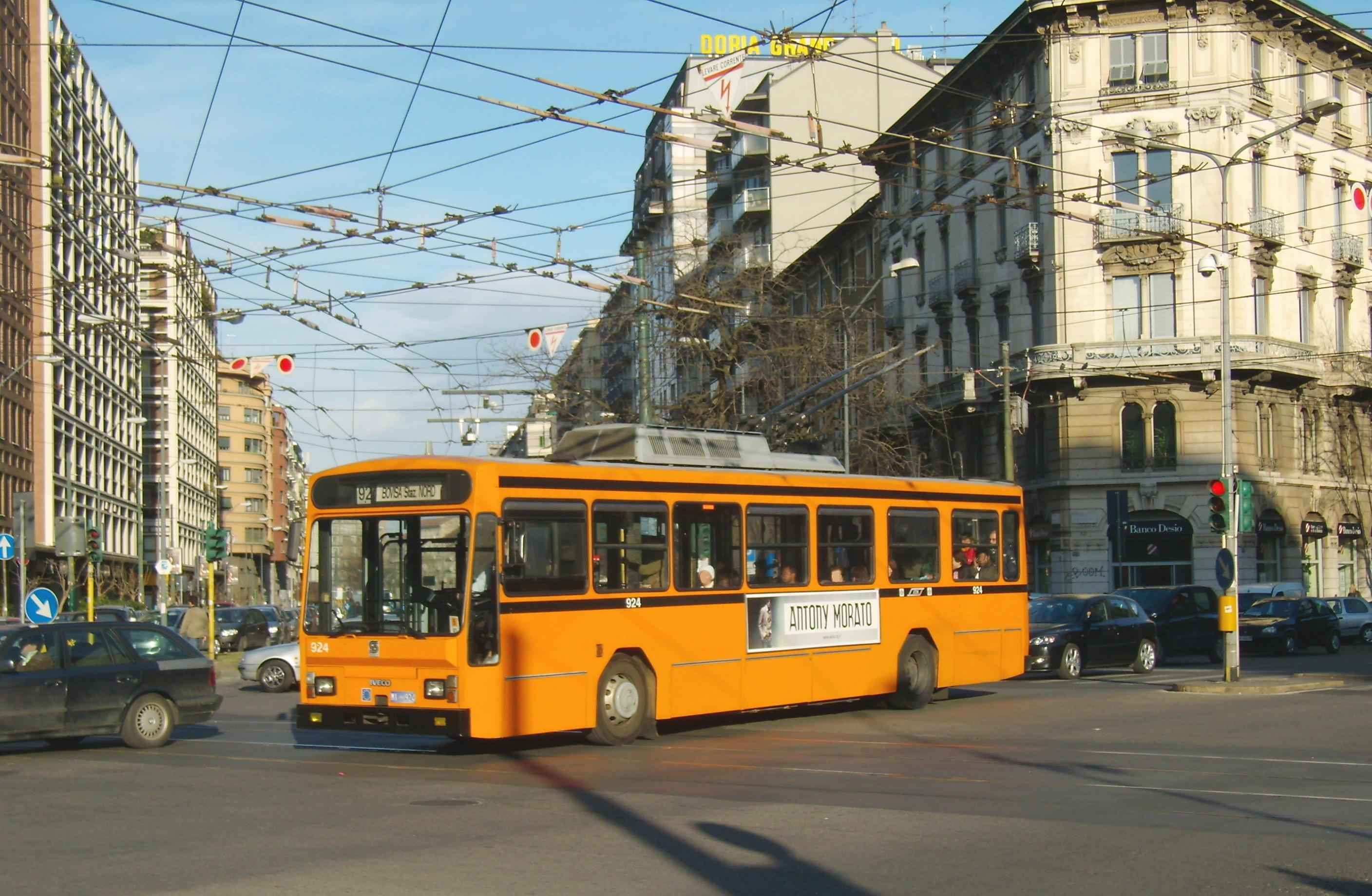
A Socimi II series (on Iveco 2470 chassis), no. 924, on route 92

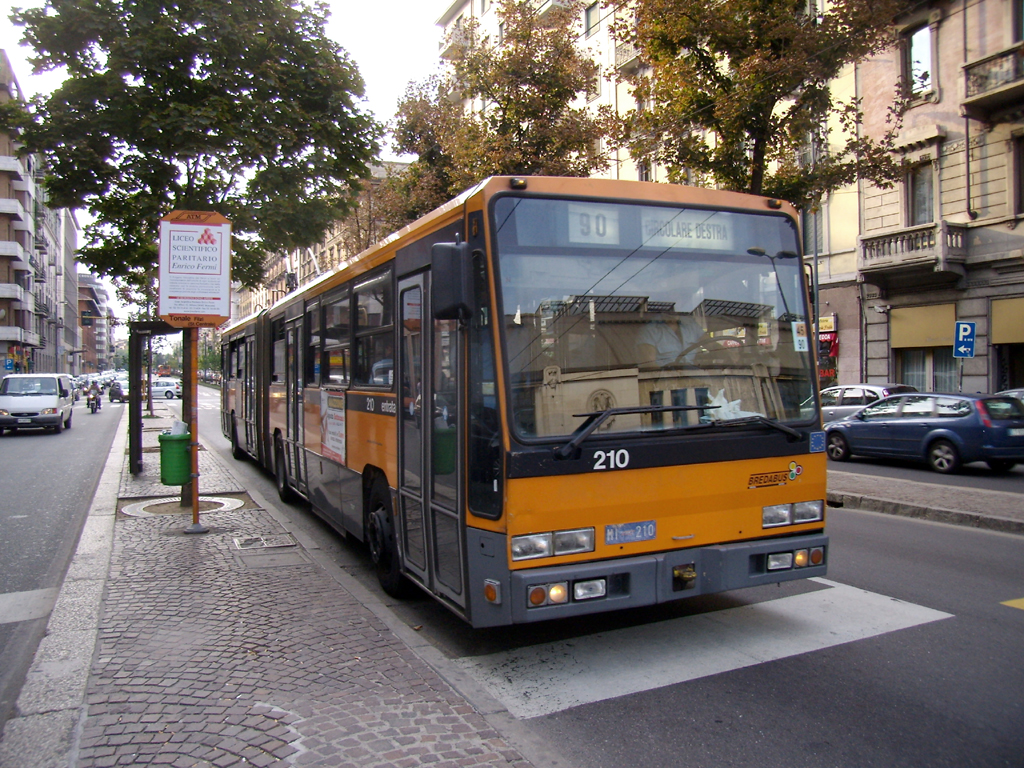
Breda 4001, no. 210, at Via Tonale

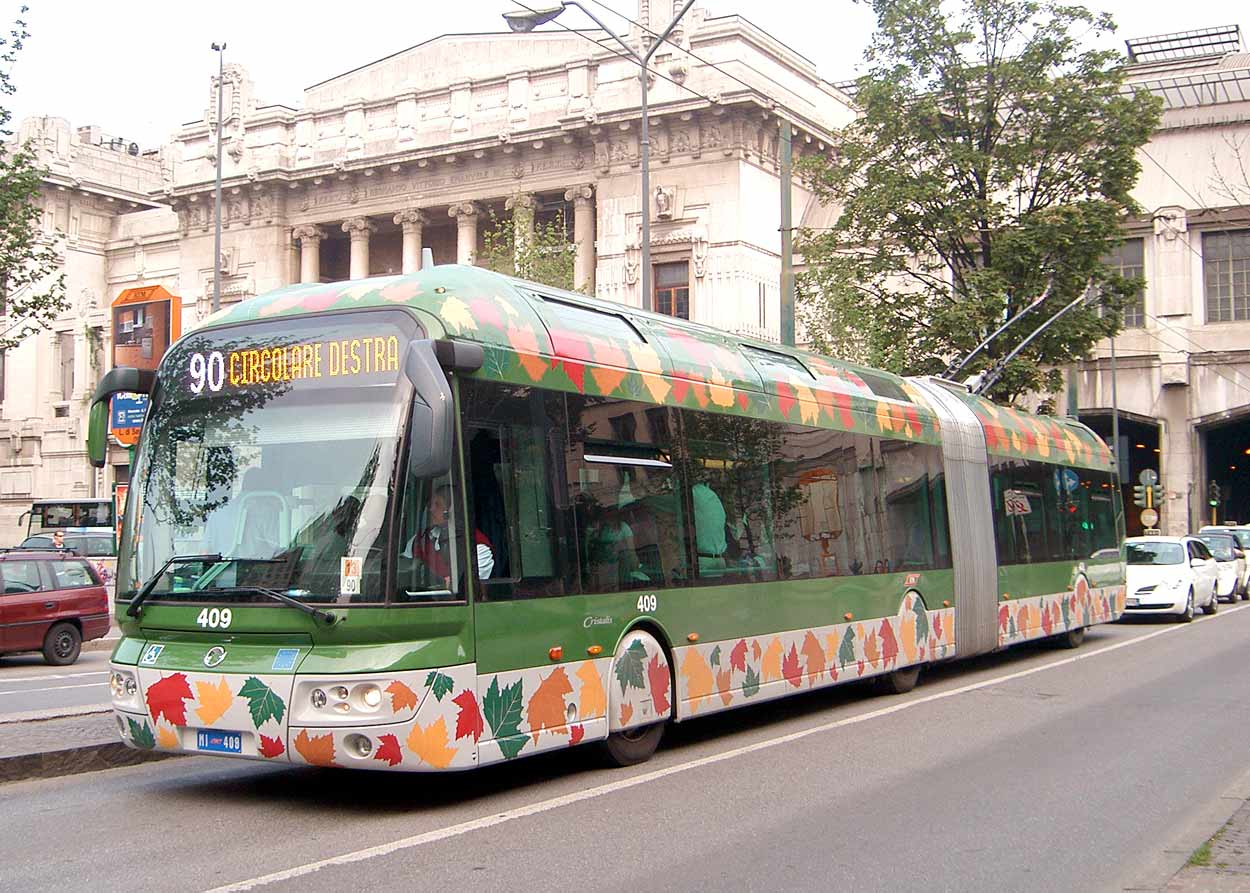
An articulated Irisbus Cristalis, no. 409, in service on route 90

The fleet comprised many different types of trolleybuses during the 20th century, including many vehicles built by Alfa Romeo and Fiat and smaller batches built by other manufacturers, such as Isotta Fraschini. The world's first articulated trolleybus was a prototype built in 1939 for the Milan system. It had an Isotta Fraschini chassis, a body by Stanga, and TIBB electrical equipment, and it was only able to bend vertically, not horizontally.

The following types were still in service during the 21st century but are retired now:

- 70 Socimi 8820 trolleybuses on Fiat 2470.12 chassis (nos. 901–970), built in 1983–1985. Many were sold or dismantled in 2008/2009 (ATM sold 23 vehicles to Ruse, Bulgaria). The last units in service in Milan were withdrawn in November 2023.
- 33 Bredabus 4001.18 F04 high-floor, articulated trolleybuses (nos. 200–232), built in 1992–94; last active unit (no. 230) was withdrawn in April 2024.
- 8 Autodromo BusOtto (nos. 300–307), partially low-floor, articulated; also known as MAN NGT 204 trolleybuses, as Autodromo constructed them on MAN chassis; built in 1997. By spring 2023, all had been taken out of service, and only two remained in storage.
- 33 Socimi F8843 high-floor articulated trolleybuses on Iveco 2480 chassis (nos. 100–132), built in 1991–1995. Although all 33 received "Socimi" badges on the front, Socimi only completed the first unit (no. 100), and then discontinued all trolleybus production, with Macchi being hired to complete the manufacturing of the bodies and overall production of the remaining 32 vehicles. By June 2024 all units were retired. These were the last high-floor trolleybuses in service in Western Europe and the last active Milano trolleybuses wearing the system's longtime orange livery.
- 10 Irisbus Cristalis type "ETB 18" low-floor, articulated trolleybuses (nos. 400–409), built in 2005–2007; only two (406/7) were still active in March 2024. The last two were retired in June 2024. When new in 2005, these vehicles introduced a livery of dark green with a grey skirt, a departure from the orange livery that had been used on Milan trolleybuses for around 30 years.

=== Current fleet ===
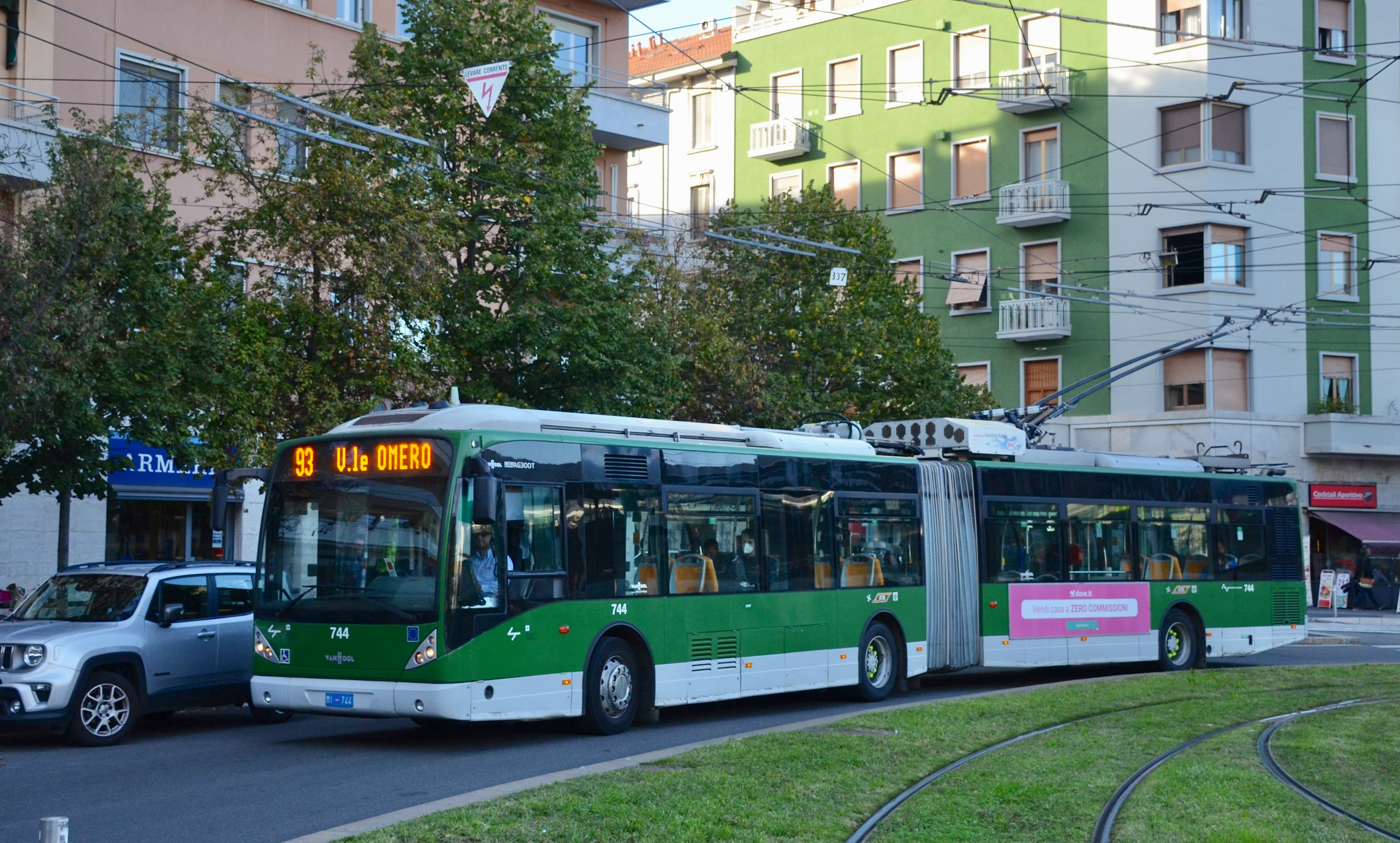
Van Hool trolleybus no. 744 on route 93

Milan's current trolleybus fleet is as follows:

- 45 Van Hool AG300T low-floor, articulated trolleybuses (nos. 700–744), built 2009–2012 and purchased in three orders of 15 each. The first two vehicles entered service in April 2009 while the last batch of 15 (nos. 730–744) arrived between December 2011 and May 2012.
- 90 Solaris Trollino IV 18-metre articulated trolleybuses (nos. 800–879), built in 2019–2023, and delivered in two separate batches. The first thirty (800–829) entered service between May 2020 and June 2021. An order for 50 more (to be nos. 830–879) was placed in November 2021; the first unit entered service in June 2023, and at least 29 of the 50 had entered service by February 2024. Another ten followed until 2025.

=== Preserved vehicles ===
- No. 548, a Fiat 2472/Viberti articulated trolleybus, built in 1958. Retired from regular service in 1996 and renovated in 2008.
- No. 955, a Fiat 2470/Socimi 8820 high-floor trolleybus, built in 1984
- No. 230, a Bredabus 4001.18 high-floor, articulated trolleybus, built in 1993

== Depots ==
There are presently two large trolleybus depots in Milan. The first depot is located in Viale Molise, east of the city. This depot accommodates about 70 trolleybuses and 40 articulated trolleybuses. The second depot is in the west of the city, and more specifically in Via Novara. It hosts about 40 articulated trolleybuses.

Both depots are used not only for the storage of trolley buses, but also for diesel powered buses. In contrast with the depots used solely for diesel buses, these depots are fully covered, for the better safeguarding of the fleet.

== See also ==
- Trams in Milan
- List of trolleybus systems in Italy
- Milan Metro
