= Socimi =

Italian manufacturing company

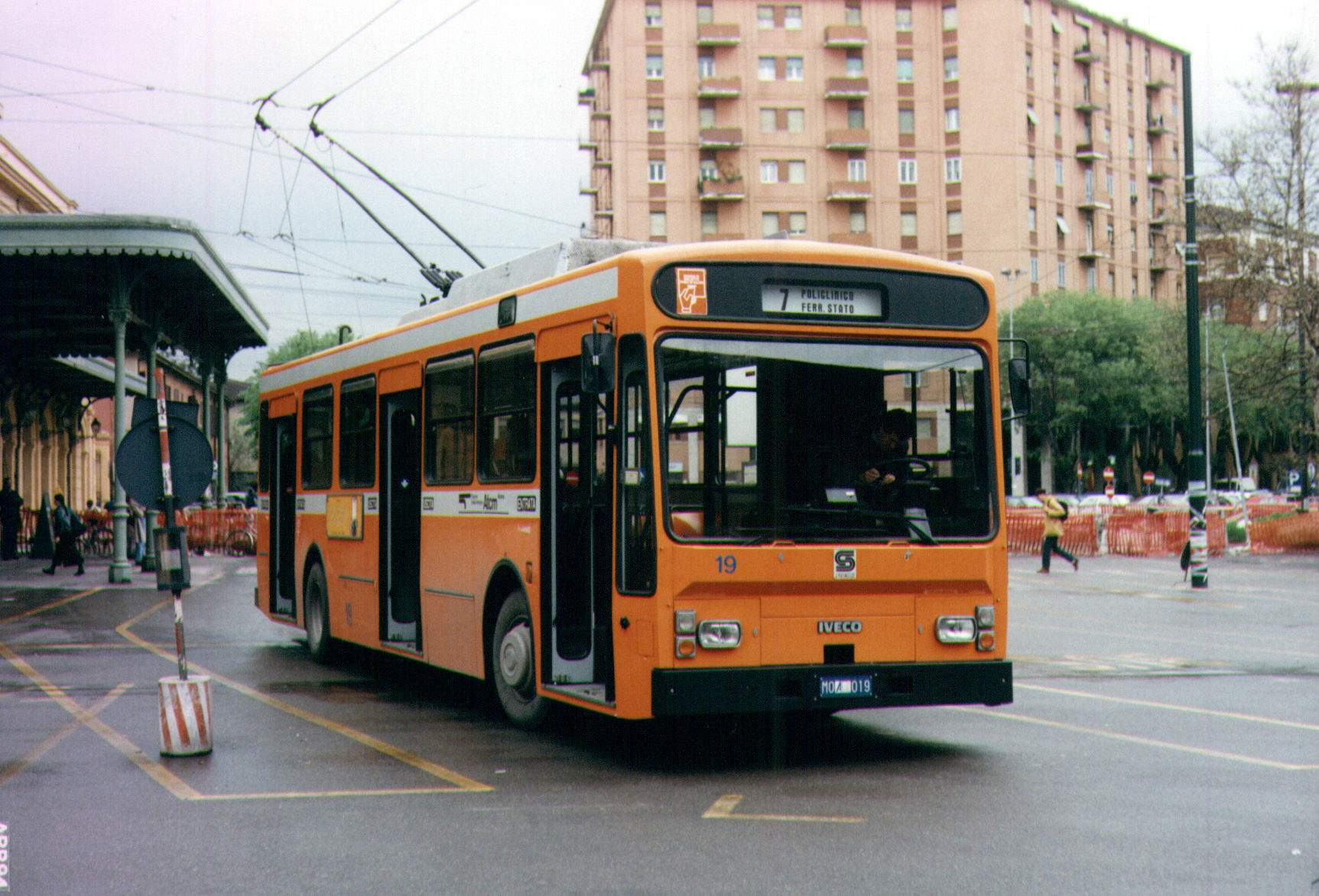
A Socimi trolleybus of the Modena trolleybus system, with company logo on front

Società Costruzioni Industriali Milano, better known as Socimi, was an Italian manufacturing company based in Milan. It was a manufacturer of trams, metro trains; traction motors for these and for trolleybuses; and bodies for motorbuses and trolleybuses. It also manufactured weapons, such as rifles. The company was founded by engineer Alessandro Marzocco in 1969 and was declared insolvent in 1994 due to its involvement in the Mani pulite scandal in 1992. The remains of said company were subsequently placed into receivership in 2002, and in 2014 an arrangement proposal ("proposta di concordato") to settle the company's remaining liabilities was made by the company Assuntore San Tommaso Uno, controlled by the US investment company Värde Partners.

Trolleybus systems, which purchased Socimi trolleybuses, included the systems of Cagliari, Milan, Modena and Salerno. The company supplied trams only to Rome, but collaborated with Bombardier Transportation in the development of the Eurotram for the Strasbourg tramway in France. Heavy rail trains produced by Socimi included the FNM Socimi coaches for Ferrovie Nord Milano as well as EMU300 trains for Taiwan Railway.

== Firearms ==
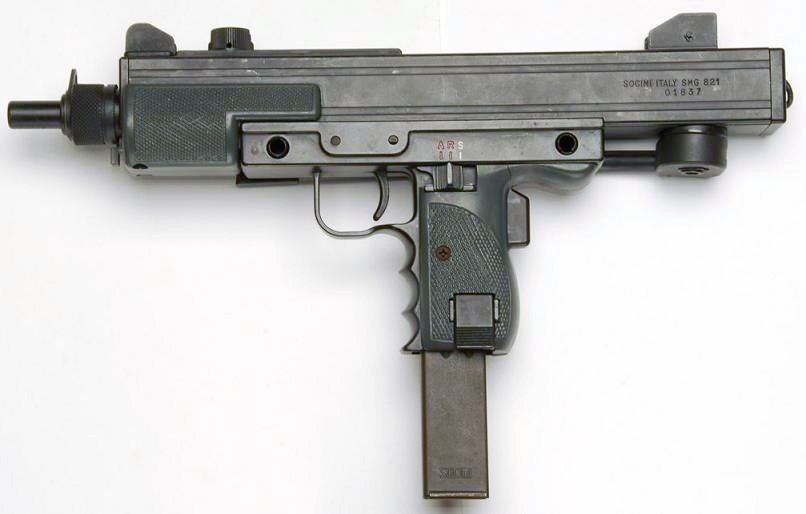
SOCIMI 9×19mm Type 821 SMG

SOCIMI produced the Socimi Type 821 submachine gun in the 1980s.
