= Trolleybuses in Modena =

Electric transit system serving Modena, Italy

Modena trolleybus system
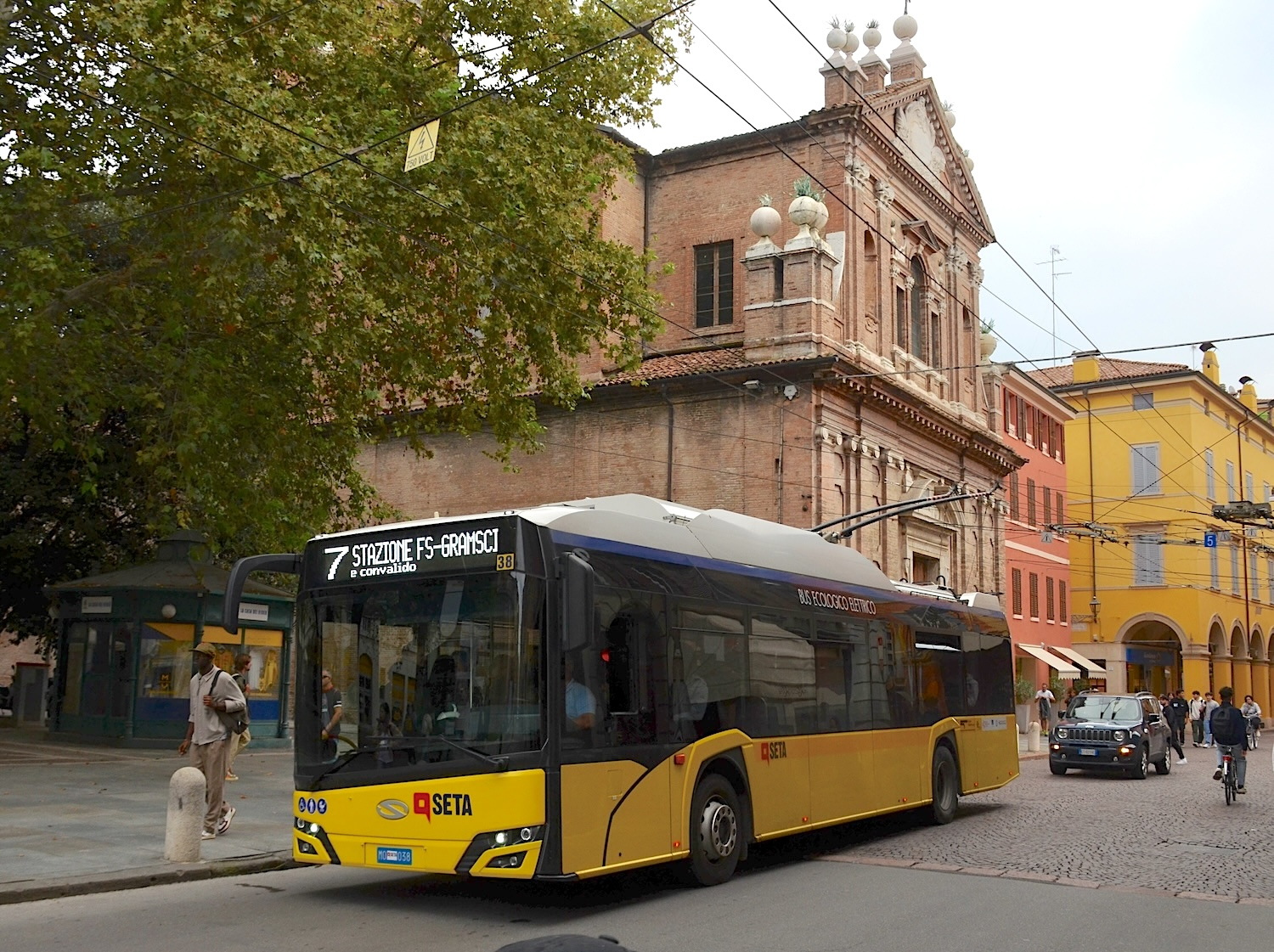
- A Solaris Trollino trolleybus on route 7 in 2024

Operation
- Locale: Modena, Emilia-Romagna, Italy
- Open: 22 January 1950
- Status: Open
- Routes: 3
- Operators: 1950–1988: AMCM; 1988–2011: ATCM; 2012–present: SETA

Infrastructure
- Electrification: 750 V DC (since 1999); (600 V, 1950–1996)

Statistics
Overview
- Website: SETA Modena (in Italian)

The Modena trolleybus system (Italian: Rete filoviaria di Modena) forms part of the public transport network of the city and comune of Modena, in the region of Emilia-Romagna, northern Italy.

In operation since 1950, the system has undergone several phases of expansion and contraction over the decades, including a re-launching since the start of 2000. It presently comprises three lines, and is one of the largest trolleybus systems in Italy.

== History ==
=== Beginnings ===
In 1949, the comune of Modena decided to replace the city's tram network with a trolleybus system, believed to be more efficient and modern. The first two lines of the planned system (3-barrato Centro - San Faustino and 5 Viale Buon Pastore - San Cataldo) were opened on 22 January 1950. In the following months, the system was expanded gradually at the expense of the trams, with all of the initial lines (1 to 5) opening by 21 October 1950. Lines 1 and 2 were an "inter-station" service, between Modena FS railway station and Modena Piazza Manzoni railway station (or Stazione Ferrovie Provinciali), with the southern portion configured as a two-way loop, line 1 running clockwise and 2 counterclockwise.

In 1952, after almost two years of service, it became necessary to revise the system, in light of observed traffic flows. Line 5 was extended, and there was a new line 6.

On 30 September 1954, a new line 7 was opened (Piazza Torre - Via Farini - Sacca), to provide a proper service to the new Sacca district, located north of the Milan–Bologna railway. This line remained in operation for little more than one year; the comune lacked the resources to extend the line westward to the village of Madonnina (and in particular to equip the homonymous overpass with overhead wires). The line was therefore operated by conventional buses until 1959, when the Madonnina extension was finally electrified, and the opportunity was taken for a second reorganisation of the system.

=== Expansion and contraction ===
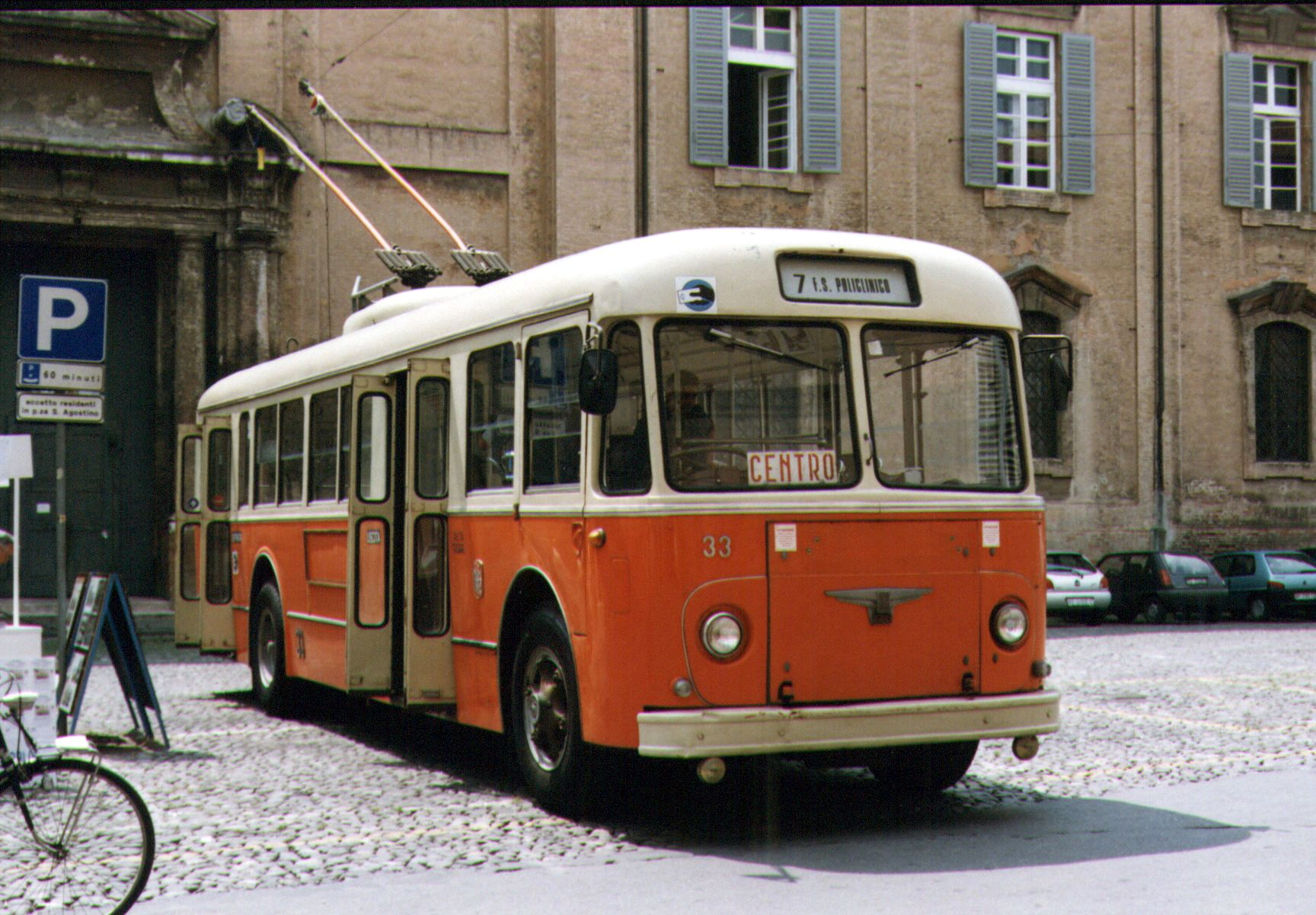
One of the Cansa-bodied Fiat trolleybuses that formed part of the fleet from 1959 to 1986, seen on display in 2000

In later years, new extensions came into service, but were accompanied by the first closures. Conventional buses were starting to be seen as more flexible, at intersections as traffic became chaotic, and in enabling Modena's transport network to cover urban expansion without the need for new infrastructure.

Specifically, on 8 December 1963 line 6 was extended to the Sacca district, to serve the new INA Casa public housing district, and on 14 June 1965 line 4 was "temporarily" suspended, to allow the construction of the Crocetta overpass (on which it was planned to install the overhead wire to extend the line). Then, on 24 July 1965, the line was diverted to the new hospital (Policlinico). The line along la Crocetta was abandoned, and later permanently deleted (on 18 June 1966) and replaced by the new line 7, routed via Largo Porta Sant'Agostino to Modena railway station, and following the new routing at Viale Monte Kosica. Also, line 4 to Madonnina was abandoned.

On 2 October 1967, an extension of line 6 was inaugurated from Viale Buon Pastore to Via Conco, including a level crossing over the SEFTA line to Sassuolo. This extension was constructed from scratch. The following years saw only contraction of Modena's trolleybus system. The closure in 1964 of the railway to Mirandola, and the planned closure (implemented in 1969) of the railway to Vignola, reduced the importance of Modena's "little station" (Modena Piazza Manzoni railway station), and trolleybus lines 1 and 2. Both lines were therefore closed on 21 August 1968, together with line 3, which was transformed into a conventional bus line and extended. Finally, on 2 October 1972, under the pretext of converting Viale Fabrizi to one-way traffic, line 5 was closed.

=== Austerity ===
The long sequence of closures was stopped, at least in part, by the so-called austerity, and the concomitant spread of ecological awareness. Indeed, the scarcity of fuel available for private traffic had necessitated increased frequency of public transport. However, to avoid excessively intensive bus traffic in the streets of Old Town, it was decided to divert the conventional buses onto the ring roads. This left only the trolleybuses in the city centre, to operate the two north–south and east–west bus lines, the high frequency lines. Limited availability of trolleybuses enabled the continued operation of the important line 7, but forced the closure of line 6. The reform came into force on 1 October 1973.

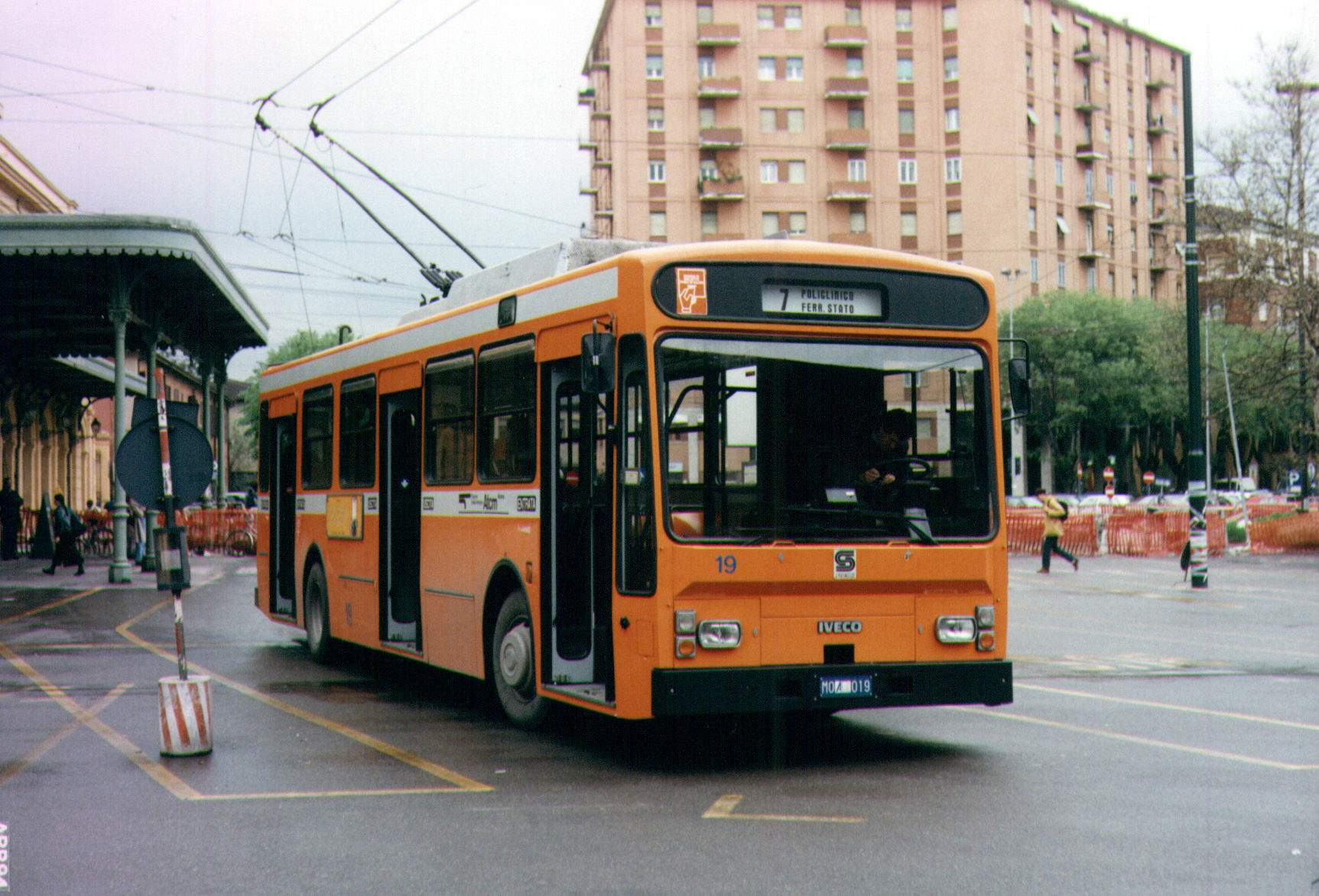
The fleet was renewed with 14 new Socimi trolleybuses in 1986.

Less than a year later, on 15 June 1974, a further change took place, transforming line 7 and extending the EO shuttle bus service to the railway station. At the end of the period of austerity, after the need to ensure high frequencies, the EW and NS shuttles could be deleted, and lines 6 and 7 reactivated. The line 6 trolleybus assumed the designation 6-barrato (abbreviated as "6/"), being the reinforcement of a longer, conventional bus route. The network was then stable for nearly two decades, because all of the investment funds of AMCM (absorbed in 1988 by ATCM) were directed, throughout the 1980s, to the renewal of the fleet of trolleybuses. However, despite the receipt of 14 new Socimi trolleybuses (with Iveco chassis) in 1986, aging infrastructure and other issues made the use of trolleybuses sporadic by the 1990s, and on route 6-barrato it ceased entirely in 1993, leaving only route 7 trolleybus-operated.

=== Revival ===
In the mid-1990s, the outlook for the trolleybus system improved greatly, as a plan (known as the "Husler Plan", after its editor, the Swiss engineer Willi Husler) was prepared for the reform of the entire system. It provided for upgrades and extensions, and the opportunity was taken to rebuild the system to the most modern dictates, by reconstructing the overhead wire to make it suitable for higher speeds, and increasing the voltage from 600 V to 750 V. All of these extensive works necessitated the suspension of all trolleybus service from 30 October 1995 until May 2000. In addition to the infrastructure upgrade and expansion, fleet improvements were also approved. ATCM placed an order for 10 new articulated, low-floor trolleybuses with Modena-based Autodromo (with MAN chassis), and also made plans to refurbish the 14 Socimi vehicles, which needed modification to enable them to operate at the planned higher voltage. The Socimi trolleybuses were also fitted with auxiliary batteries permitting limited movement away from the overhead trolley wiring. The first Autodromo vehicle was delivered in spring 1999.

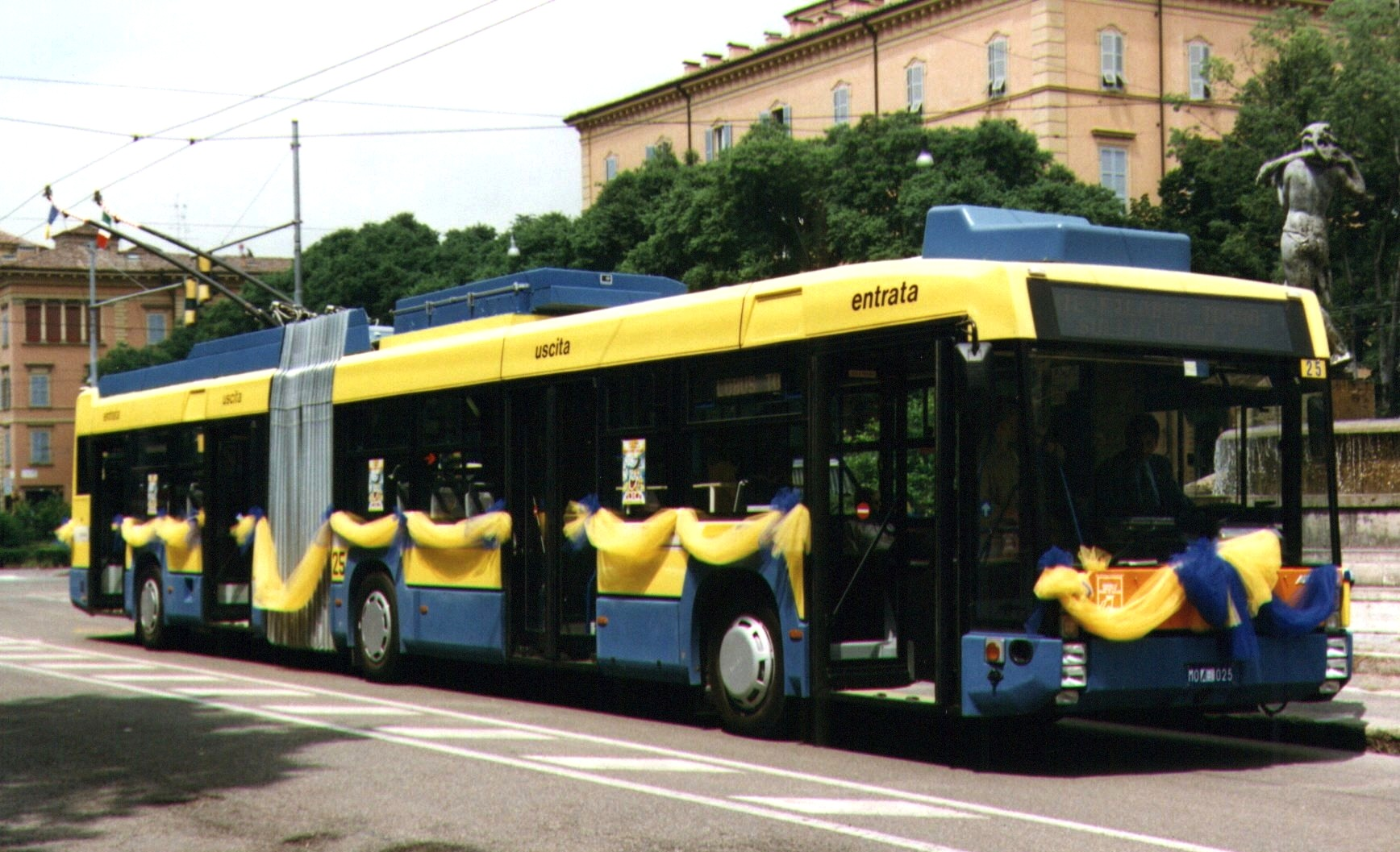
Trolleybus decorated in celebration of the resumption of trolleybus service and the entry into service of new low-floor vehicles, in May 2000

In 2000, trolleybus service in Modena resumed after a nearly four-year suspension. The return of trolleybuses was ceremonially marked on 13 May 2000 by the operation of two decorated Autodromo trolleybuses through the city centre, without passengers, and the display of a preserved vintage Modena trolleybus, 1959-built Fiat/Cansa no. 33. The actual resumption of trolleybus service occurred two days later, on Monday, 15 May 2000, with the reopening of the renovated line 7. The new Autodromo articulated trolleybuses entered service on that date.

The reopening of line 6 to trolleybuses followed on 13 November 2000, now operating Sant'Anna – city centre – Via Forlì, bringing into use new wiring along Corso Canal Grande (in place of Via Farini) in the city centre and extensions at both ends: from Sacca to Sant'Anna and from Viale Buon Pastore to Via Forlì. ATCM had opened a large new depot (garage) at Sant'Anna in 1996. The refurbished Socimi trolleybuses of 1986 returned to service at that time.

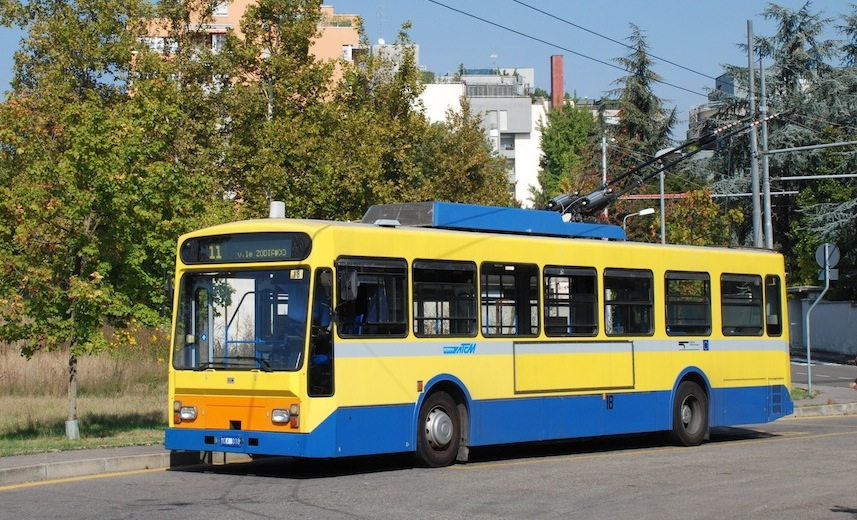
A refurbished and repainted Socimi / Iveco trolleybus at the Zodiaco terminus of route 11 in 2007

The final stage of the trolleybus system's major renovation and expansion was completed on 11 June 2001, with the conversion of bus route 11 to trolleybuses. This change coincided with a reorganization of routes, such that route 11 took over the city centre – Sant'Anna portion of route 6, and the latter was diverted north/west of the city centre to instead run to Via Santi (also known as Uffici Comunali), a new route section which opened to trolleybuses on that date. Another newly built trolleybus extension that opened on 11 June 2001 was to Via Gramsci, which had been served by motorbus route 11, but concurrent with its conversion to trolleybuses, became instead served by a route 7, extended north from Stazione FS. These openings and route changes resulted in the trolleybus network comprising the following three routes on weekdays and Saturday mornings:

- 6: Via Santi – Viale Berengario – Piazza Roma (Accademia) – Via Forlì
- 7: Via Gramsci – Stazione FS – Autostazione (intercity bus station) – Policlinico
- 11: Sant'Anna – Stazione FS – Autostazione (intercity bus station) – Viale dello Zodiaco

On Saturday afternoons and Sundays, lines 6 and 7 were replaced by lines 60 and 70, which had routings intended to avoid a section of Via Emilia in the city centre which was pedestrianised at those times. (These were renumbered 6A and 7A in 2007.)

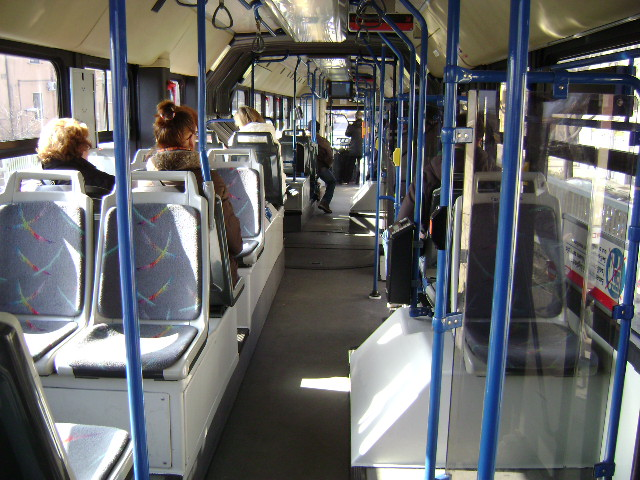
Interior of a Modena MAN/Autodromo trolleybus

In detail, in addition to the reconstruction of the two old lines 6-barrato and 7, the 1996–2000 construction programme including creation of the following new sections of trolleybus route from scratch:

- Staz. Autolinee (also known as Autostazione) - Via Santi, which largely follows the line 5 branch line to San Cataldo that was closed in 1972;
- extension from Via Conco (near Buon Pastore terminus) to Via Forlì;
- Viale Berengario;
- Corso Canal Grande (in place of Via Farini);
- Sacca overpass - Viale Gramsci;
- extension from Sacca to Sant'Anna;
- new line from Piazzale Risorgimento to Viale dello Zodiaco, including the line 3 branch line to San Faustino closed in 1968.

=== Post-2001 ===
On 2 July 2007, route 7 was extended from the hospital (Policlinico) east to Via Gottardi, partly running along private roads through the hospital grounds, but temporarily converted to motorbuses pending certification of the new wiring; trolleybus service on the new extension was introduced on 8 October 2007. Also on 2 July, routes 6 and 11 were revised in the city centre, with route 6 no longer serving the railway station, leaving unused the relatively new wiring along Viale Berengario, and route 11 taking over from route 6 the service along Corso Canal Grande and via Piazza Roma. The outer termini of both routes were unchanged.

Effective 1 January 2012, a reorganization saw the replacement of Azienda Trasporti Collettivi e Mobilita (ATCM)^{IT} by Società Emiliana Trasporti Autofiloviari S.p.A. (SETA)^{IT} as the operator of all urban transit service in Modena.

In spring 2012, route 6 was extended a second time at its southern end, by about 250 metres (820 ft) from Via Forlì to Via Chinnici, along new streets built in 2011 to serve new apartment blocks. The service was extended on 11 April, but temporarily using diesel buses, and regular operation with trolleybuses did not begin until 15 May 2012.

In early 2018, SETA placed an order with Solaris Bus & Coach for eight new trolleybuses, two-axle vehicles which would replace the remaining Socimi vehicles, the last high-floor trolleybuses in the fleet. The first was delivered in February 2020; by February 2021, all eight had arrived, and they began to enter service at that time. An order for two more was placed later, and they entered service around March or April 2024.

In mid-September 2022, the western part of route 6 was discontinued entirely, as part of route changes in the area it served, making Autostazione (the intercity bus station) the western terminus of route 6.

== Services ==
On Mondays to Fridays and on Saturday mornings, the routes comprising the present Modena trolleybus system are as follows:

6	Autostazione – Corso Canal Chiaro – Piazza Risorgimento – Viale Buon Pastore – Via Chinnici
7	Viale Gramsci – Stazione FS – Viale Monte Kosica – Autostazione – Largo Garibaldi – Policlinico – Via Gottardi
11	Sant'Anna – Sacca – Stazione FS – Piazza Roma – Corso Canal Grande – Corso Canal Chiaro – Piazza Risorgimento – Via Giardini – Viale dello Zodiaco

On Saturday afternoons and Sundays, route 11 has no service, and route 7 is replaced by 7A. Route 7A is designed to avoid the section of Via Emilia that is pedestrianised at these times (between Corso Duomo and Corso Canal Grande) and to cover part of route 11 during those times, and is diverted via Piazza Roma instead of Autostazione, but its outer termini are unchanged.

As of autumn 2024, routes 6 and 11 have both been diverted away from Corso Duomo and Corso Canal Grande since at least 2022, initially because of construction but subsequently because of traffic restrictions on Corso Canal Grande that banned private cars from the street. Removal of buses from the street was originally planned to be temporary, but it was later reported that the city council in April 2023 was considering making the closure to all motor-vehicle traffic permanent. Trolleybuses on routes 6 and 11 instead use Viale Vittorio Veneto between Largo Aldo Moro and Piazzale Risorgimento, operating on battery power because that section is not equipped with overhead wiring.

== Fleet ==
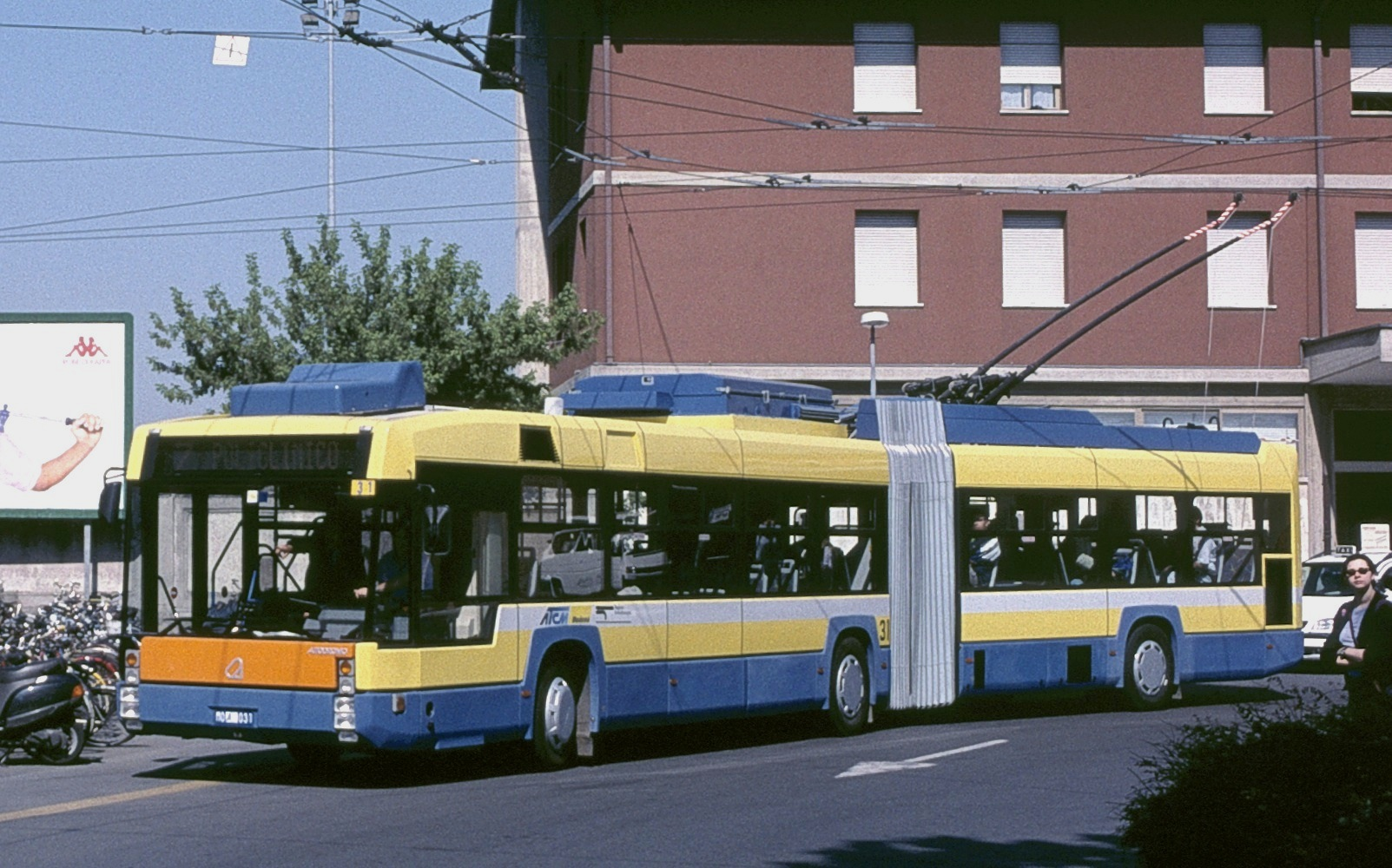
Autodromo / MAN articulated trolleybus, on the first day of service for the type, in 2000

=== Past fleet ===
The following trolleybuses have been used on the Modena system, but are now retired:

- Fiat 668/F 122 Cansa CGE (4 trolleybuses, nos. 11–14), originally destined for Catania.
- Fiat 668/F 131 Viberti Marelli (12 trolleybuses, nos. 15–26), built in 1950. The last remaining units were retired in 1972, upon the closure of line 5; no. 17 was bought by a private purchaser, and is still visible, although in poor condition, in a private forest at Serramazzoni (MO).
- Fiat 2401 Cansa Marelli: (2 trolleybuses, nos. 27–28), built in 1953. Due to several problems with the steering and electrical systems, these units were withdrawn in 1967.
- Fiat 2411 Cansa CGE (6 trolleybuses, nos. 29–34), registered in 1959. The last units were withdrawn from service in 1986. No. 33 was maintained for training drivers until the end of the 1980s, and has been preserved in Modena as a historic vehicle. In May 2009, after a thorough exterior restoration, including repainting into its original two-tone green livery, it was placed on semi-permanent display at the depot (and administrative headquarters) of ATCM (now SETA).
- Fiat 2411 Menarini Marelli (6 trolleybuses, nos. 35–41), built in 1964, served until 1986. No. 37, when retired, was taken to the National Museum of Transport^{IT} in La Spezia, where it still awaits restoration.
- Fiat 2411 Cansa CGE (4 trolleybuses, nos. 42-45 (ex-61, 62, 63 and 65 ATAM Livorno)), built in 1958. Purchased used from the Livorno trolleybus system upon its closure in 1974. Retired in 1986, and were purchased in 1991 by the Dopolavoro Ferroviario di Livorno for museum purposes.
- Iveco 2471 Socimi F8833 (14 trolleybuses, nos. 11–24), entered service in 1986. Refurbished starting in 1999/2000, including modification for the change of the system's voltage from 600V to 750V. Retired by early 2021.

=== Current fleet ===
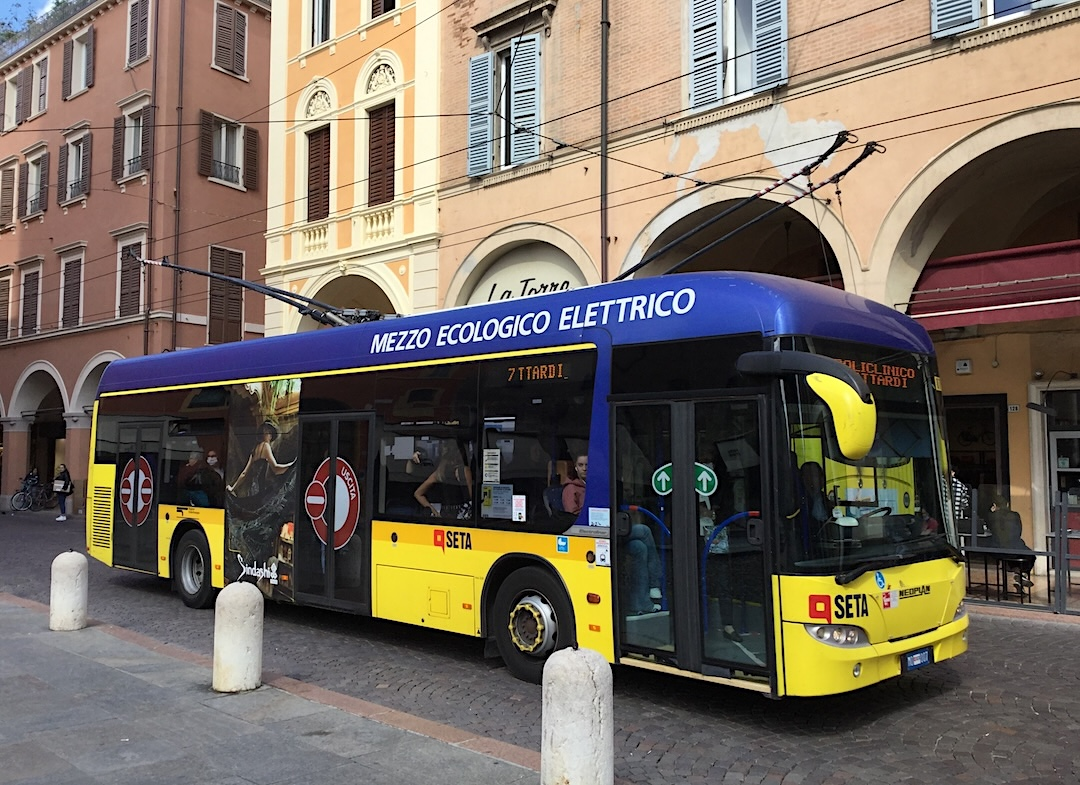
Trolleybus 07 is one of two built by Viseon Bus to Neoplan designs and almost identical to five Neoplan-built vehicles in the fleet.

Modena's present trolleybus fleet is made up of only the following three types:

- Autodromo BusOtto 18, with MAN NGT 204F chassis (10 articulated trolleybuses, nos. 25–34); built 1999–2000 and entered service in 2000.
- Neoplan Electroliner N6216 (5 trolleybuses, nos. 01–05); built 2007–08 and entered service in late 2008 (01–03) and August 2009 (04–05).
- Viseon Bus Electroliner N6216 (2 trolleybuses, nos. 06–07); built 2009–10, but did not enter service until October 2013.
- Solaris Trollino 12 (10 trolleybuses, nos. 35–44); first eight built 2020, last two 2023; first entered service February 2021.

The Neoplan and Viseon vehicles are almost identical and were built in the same factory. The last two vehicles (nos. 06–07) were ordered from Neoplan in 2008, but in early 2009 Neoplan's production of trolleybuses and special-purpose buses was spun off as a separate company, Viseon Bus, including the designs and production facilities. Modena trolleybuses 06–07 were built by Viseon in 2009–10 and delivered in July 2010, but then were returned to the factory for modifications, and did not finally enter service until 2013.

== See also ==
- Modena railway station
- List of trolleybus systems in Italy

== Sources ==
=== Books ===
- Bedoni, Alessandro; Cantoni, Massimiliano; Fantini, Giorgio (2003). Binari nel cielo. Mezzo secolo di filovie a Modena [Rails in the Sky. Half a Century of Trolleybuses in Modena] (in Italian). Modena: RFM Edizione.
- Gregoris, Paolo; Rizzoli, Francesco; Serra, Claudio (2003). Giro d'Italia in filobus [Tour of Italy by Trolleybus] (in Italian). Cortona: Calosci Editore. pp. 166–170. ISBN 88-7785-193-7.
