= Socimi Type 821 =

SOCIMI Type 821-SMG
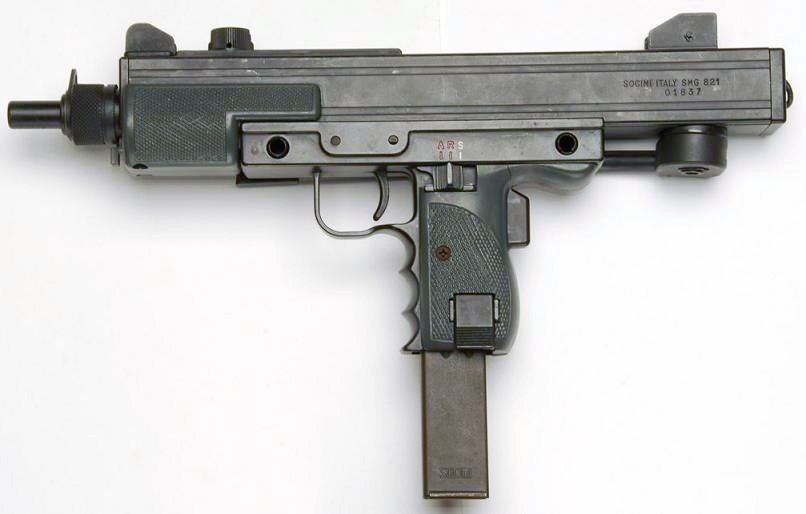
- Type: Submachine gun
- Place of origin: Italy

Service history
- In service: 1980s-present
- Used by: Nucleo Operativo Centrale di Sicurezza

Production history
- Designed: 1983
- Manufacturer: Societa Costruzioni Industriali Milano, Luigi Franchi S.p.A.
- Produced: 1984-1989
- No. built: Uncharted
- Variants: Type 821-5 Micro SMG (experimental only)

Specifications
- Mass: 2.45 kg (5 lb 6oz)
- Length: 600 mm (23.6 in) butt extended, 400 mm (15.7 in) butt folded
- Barrel length: 200 mm (7.87 in.)
- Height: 175 mm (6.88 in.)
- Cartridge: 9×19mm Parabellum
- Caliber: 9mm
- Action: Blowback, Select-fire
- Rate of fire: 550 rounds/min
- Muzzle velocity: 380 m/s (1245 ft/s)
- Effective firing range: 150–200 metres
- Feed system: 32-round detachable box magazine
- Sights: Adjustable post front sight; Flip-aperture rear sight, (100 and 200 metres); Sight radius: 288 mm

The Socimi Type 821-SMG was a submachine gun manufactured in the 1980s by the firm of SOCIMI, Società Costruzioni Industriali Milano, SpA located in Milan, Italy.

== Development ==
At a first glance the Socimi Type 821-SMG appears to be an outright Italian copy of the Uzi, although the design sports many differences and improvements over the original project. The firm of SOCIMI had been active in the railway building sector since the early 1970s; in 1983, it entered in a joint venture with the historic firearms manufacturer Luigi Franchi S.p.A. (which later, specifically in 1987, would have outright taken over) to concentrate on the military weapons business. The results of this collaboration were a series of assault rifles, and the Type 821-SMG. The early prototypes and evaluation samples of this sub-machinegun were shortly manufactured directly by Franchi, until SOCIMI had completed tooling-up to start in-house production.

=== Description ===
The Uzi was taken as a basis, and several technical solutions of such weapon were outright adopted, including the telescoping bolt (already in use in another Italian sub-machinegun, the Beretta PM-12), the safety/fire selector switch and the grip safety, and housing of the magazine in the pistol grip. However, SOCIMI/Franchi engineers wanted to distinguish their weapon from the Uzi, by developing a wide array of newer features.

The SOCIMI sub-machinegun was built around a solid, monolithic rectangular receiver made out of one single piece of lightweight alloy, departing from the Uzi's heavy stamped steel receiver design; the SOCIMI receiver has one single opening on the rear from which the entire bolt assembly can be extracted, while the barrel is inserted in the front and secured by a nut, and can be separated from the receiver by unscrewing it like in the Uzi. The grip has finger grooves for better handling. The gun also derives its charging handle being located on top of the receiver from the UZI.

The stock is tubular and sidefolding, departing from the complicated retractable design of the Israeli UZI; it pivots underneath the back side of the receiver and lies flat against the right side of the gun when folded. It is longer than the Uzi stock (200 millimetres vs. 180), and results more comfortable to operate and to shoulder. The buttpad folds horizontally against the stock when not in use. While the Uzi's collapsing stock could be useful as a blunt object/weapon in the event of extremely close engagements or hand-to-hand combat, the SOCIMI Type 821-SMG stock was not designed with such use in mind.

The SOCIMI Type 821-SMG is overall lighter and more compact than the Uzi, weighing 2,450 grams unloaded vs. 3,500 grams of the Uzi unloaded; and has an overall length of 400 millimetres with stock folded (vs. 470 millimetres) and 600 millimetres with stock unfolded (same as the Uzi). The overall length reduction was achieved by shortening the barrel, using a 200 millimetres length vs. the original 260 millimetres. This has helped to achieve a slower rate of fire of 550 rounds per minute vs. the original 600 rpm of the Uzi. Controllability in full-automatic fire results dramatically enhanced. Optimum results are obtained within a range of 150–200 metres, the telescopic bolt balances the weapon such that it can be fired one-handed with complete control.

While the Type 821 can use its own 32-round magazines, it can use magazines from the Uzi.

=== Users ===
The SOCIMI Type 821-SMG was acquired in small quantities by the Italian Ministry of Interior and distributed to the NOCS team of the Italian Police, and possibly to other unknown Italian units or organizations. The SOCIMI Type 821-SMG never went to become the standard sub-machinegun of any Italian force, as SOCIMI went bankrupt in 1992 and the production of their assault weapons system (including the Type 821-SMG) was halted to be never reprised again. Franchi, owned by SOCIMI until the bankruptcy and undoubtedly the entity behind the development of the SOCIMI weapons system, offered shortly the Type 821-SMG as the "Franchi LF-821" with no success; it was ultimately acquired by the Beretta Holding and as such stopped development and production of all strictly military-oriented firearms.

The SOCIMI Type 821-SMG samples acquired by Italian forces are now kept in stock. Other samples of this and other SOCIMI firearms are kept in warehouses by Italian firms such as Luigi Franchi S.p.A. and Fiocchi Munizioni. Rumors of foreign sales can find no confirm whatsoever; before bankruptcy, SOCIMI had reached export agreements with a United States company called MTS Corporation, located in Philadelphia, Pennsylvania.

== Variants ==
Experimental developments from the SOCIMI Type 821-SMG include a special tactical briefcase for the full-size model, and the SOCIMI Type 821-5 Micro SMG, a compact version with an overall length of 250 millimetres; none of these ever passed the prototype stage.

== Gallery ==
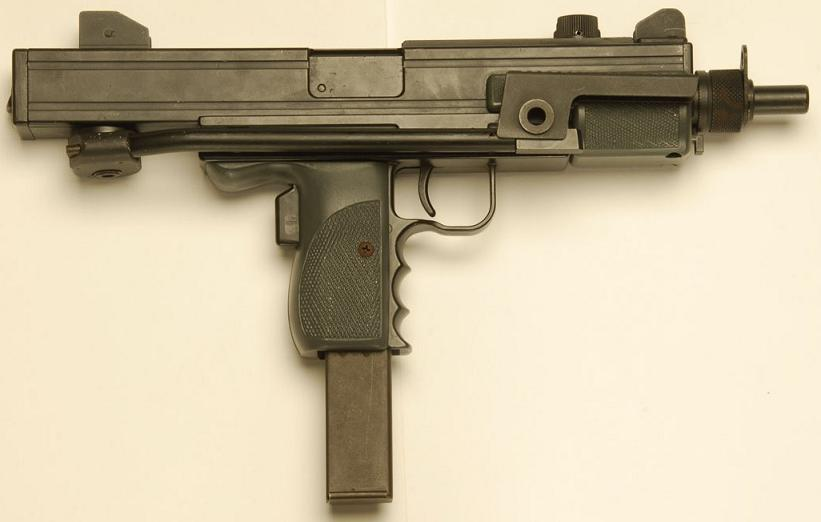
With stock folded

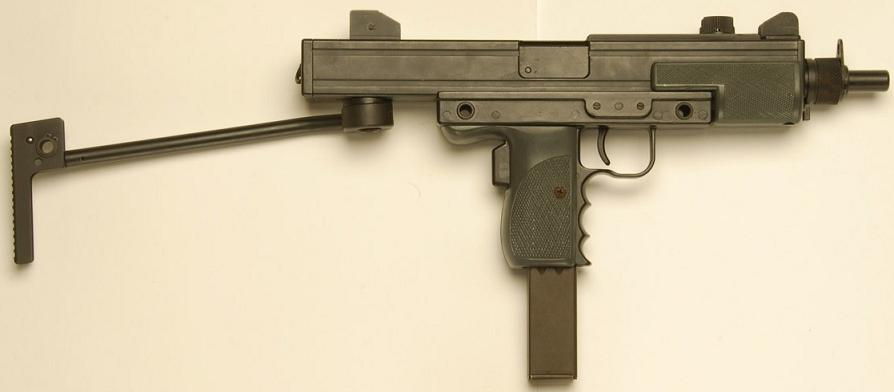
With stock unfolded
