= Lysogorsky =

Lysogorsky (masculine), Lysogorskaya (feminine), or Lysogorskoye (neuter) may refer to:

- Lysogorsky District, a district of Saratov Oblast, Russia
- Lysogorsky (rural locality) (Lysogorskaya, Lysogorskoye), name of several rural localities in Russia

== See also ==
- Lysye Gory
