= Trolleybuses in Dushanbe =

Public transit system in Dushanbe, Tajikistan

Dushanbe trolleybus system
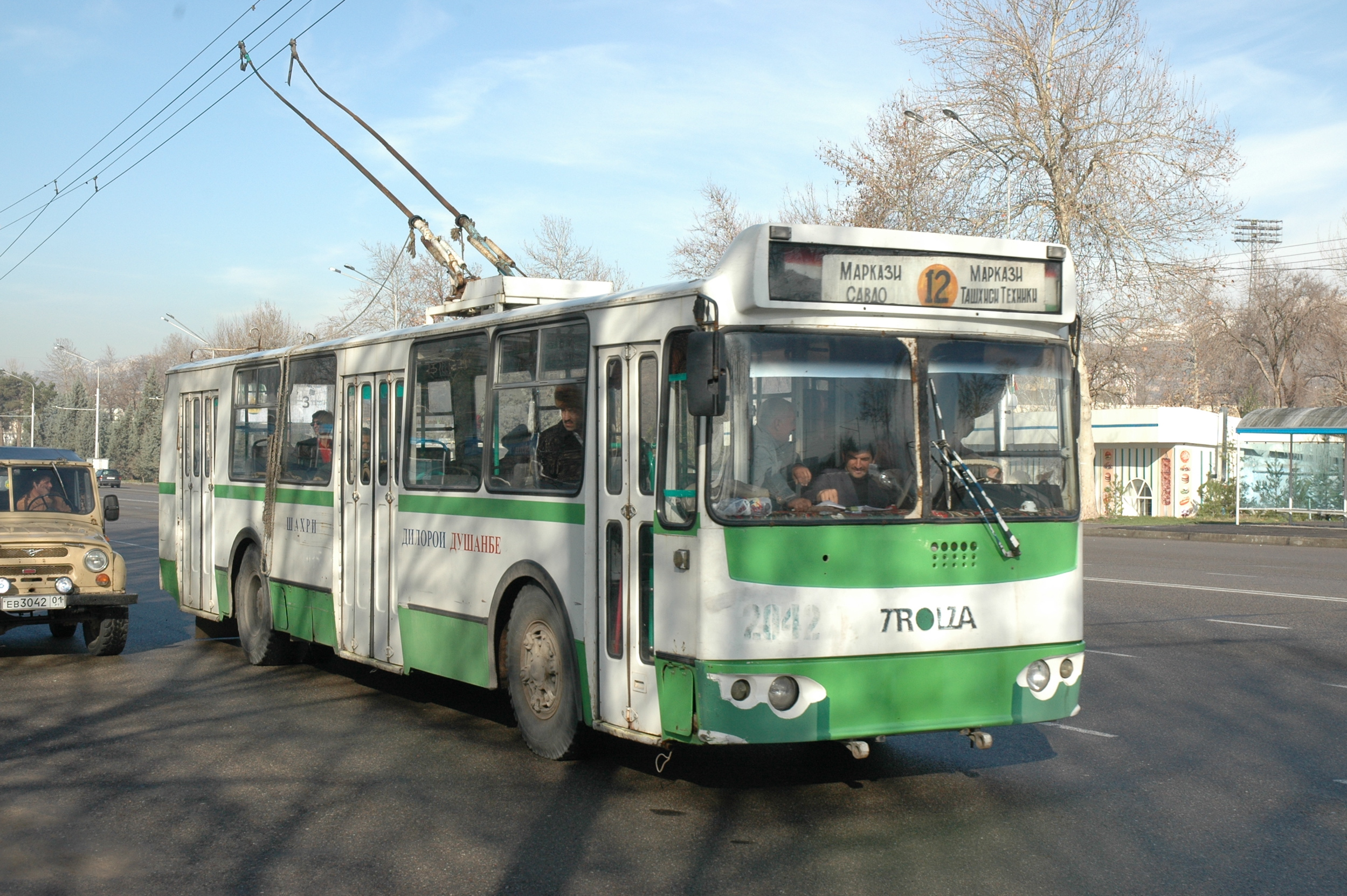
- A Trolza ZiU-682-016 trolleybus in Dushanbe, 2010.

Operation
- Locale: Dushanbe, Tajikistan
- Open: 1955
- Status: Open
- Routes: 8 (as at 2006)
- Operators: "Душанбенаклиётхадамотрасон"; Passenger Unitary Enterprise

Infrastructure
- Depot: 2
- Stock: ~ 200 (2015)

The Dushanbe trolleybus system forms part of the public transport network of Dushanbe, the capital and largest city of Tajikistan. In operation since 1955. The system presently comprises eight routes as of 2006.

== History ==
The development of electric transport in Dushanbe (then called Stalinabad) was authorised on 6 April 1955, when, according to decision no 106 of the Stalinabad City Council executive committee, a trolleybus management agency was established.

On 1 May 1955, amidst great festivities, the first city trolleybuses operated the inaugural services along the main thoroughfare of the republic - then named Lenin Avenue (now Rudaki Prospect). They were Engels MTB-82D trolleybuses, produced at the Uritskogo plant. The first route extended only 11 km (7 mi) from the city centre, and ran from via Lenin Avenue to the railway station.

In 1957, line no 2 was opened, and in 1958 line no 3. By the time the second trolleybus depot was commissioned in 1967, the length of the overhead wire network had increased to 49 km (30 mi). There were nine routes, 65 trolleybuses, and 700 workers.

With the collapse of the Soviet Union and disruption of oil supplies that periodically occurred in Tajikistan in the 1990s, urban transport in Dushanbe experienced significant problems. The fleet of conventional buses all but ceased to exist, and therefore the main forms of passenger transport in the streets were trolleybuses. During the oil shortage, all the existing electric rolling stock was pressed into service, including maintenance trucks and KTH-1 trolleybuses produced by the Kiev electric factory. The number of trolleybuses that were in operation in the late 1980s had reached 250 ZiU-682 vehicles; by the end of the 1990s, the fleet had declined to 45-50 units and the route network had shrunk.

Since independence, Tajikistan has acquired 27 second hand trolley buses, each a minimum of 10 years old. In an effort to maintain existing rolling stock made in the mid-1990s, a batch of trolleybuses was sent to Kazakhstan for major repairs at the Alma-Ata tram and trolleybus plant, but due to a lack of funding they were never repaired, and there was no money to "return" them back to Dushanbe.

In summer 2000, to solve the problem of updating the Dushanbe trolleybus fleet, Ikarus 260 and Ikarus 280 bus bodies, intended for conversion into trolleybuses, were delivered to the 1st trolleybus depot. The task of designing and installing power equipment was assigned to the leading electrician at the depot, N.H. Salahitdinovu. His crew of mechanics and electricians coped with the task - six buses were converted to trolleybuses during 2001 - giving them two extra years of service life.

On 9 September 2004, the mayor of Dushanbe, Mahmadsayid Ubaydullayev, and the CEO of the Russian JSC "Trolza-Market", Paul Berlin, signed a contract for the procurement of 100 new trolley buses to meet Dushanbe's public transport needs. The first deliveries of new trolleybuses under this contract began in the summer and autumn of 2005, and the last, one hundredth, machine arrived in April 2006. With the commissioning of the new machines, older trolleybuses in the fleet were withdrawn.

== Services ==
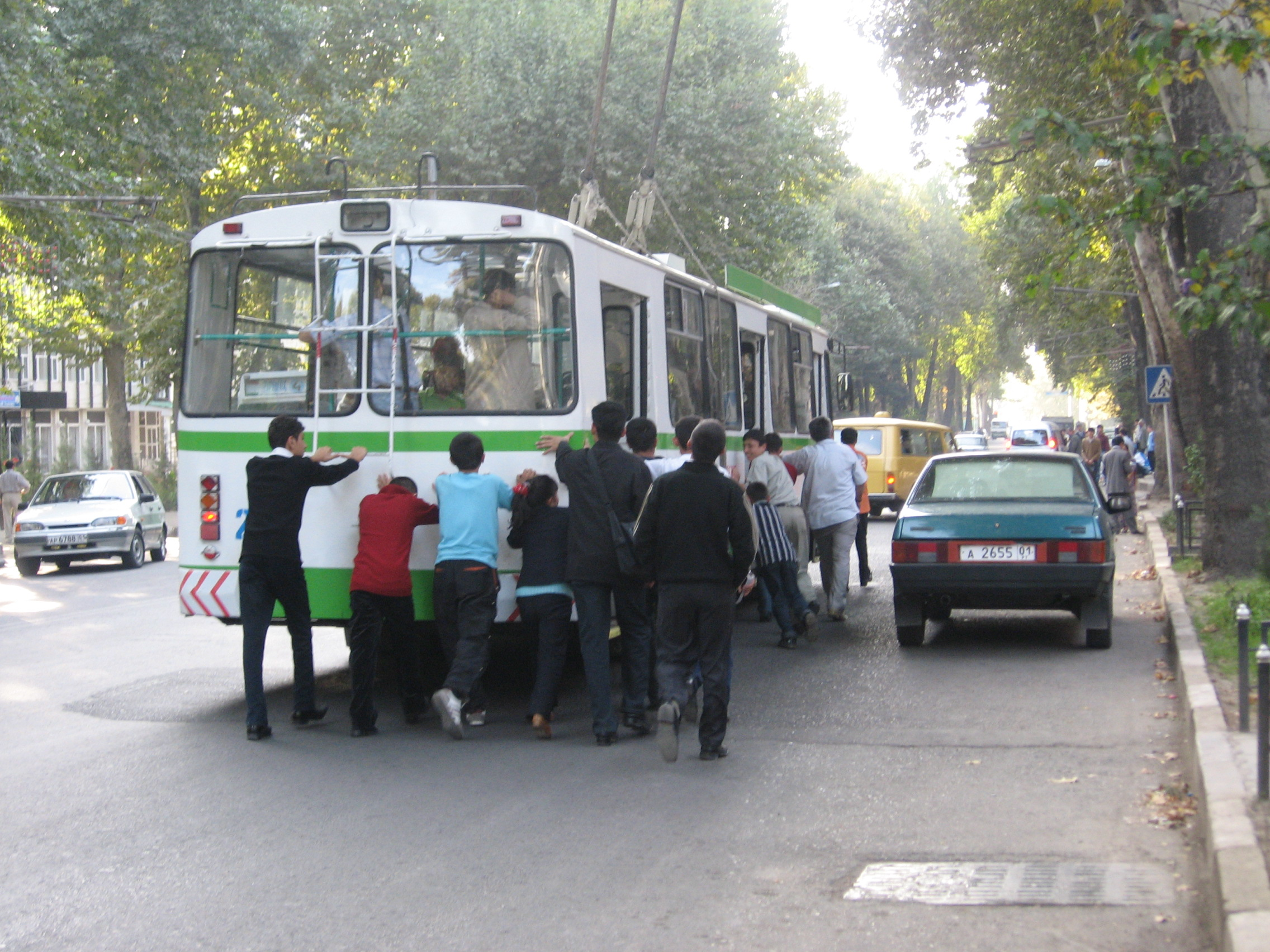
Pushing a Dushanbe trolleybus.

As of 2006, Dushanbe had eight trolleybus lines: nos 1, 2, 4, 5, 8, 10, 12 and 14.

The Dushanbe trolleybus system has a few operational features that have become conventional in recent years.

As of 2017 the first concerns the method of payment for travel and loading procedures. Each serving trolleybus has a crew of 2 persons. One is the driver and the second one collects the ticket fee and remounts the collector in case it jumps off. A ticket costs currently 1 Somoni for an adult.

Due to the significant deterioration of the overhead wire network, the current collectors come down frequently. The ticket person is therefore trained and able to remount the collectors in less than one minute.

== Fleet ==
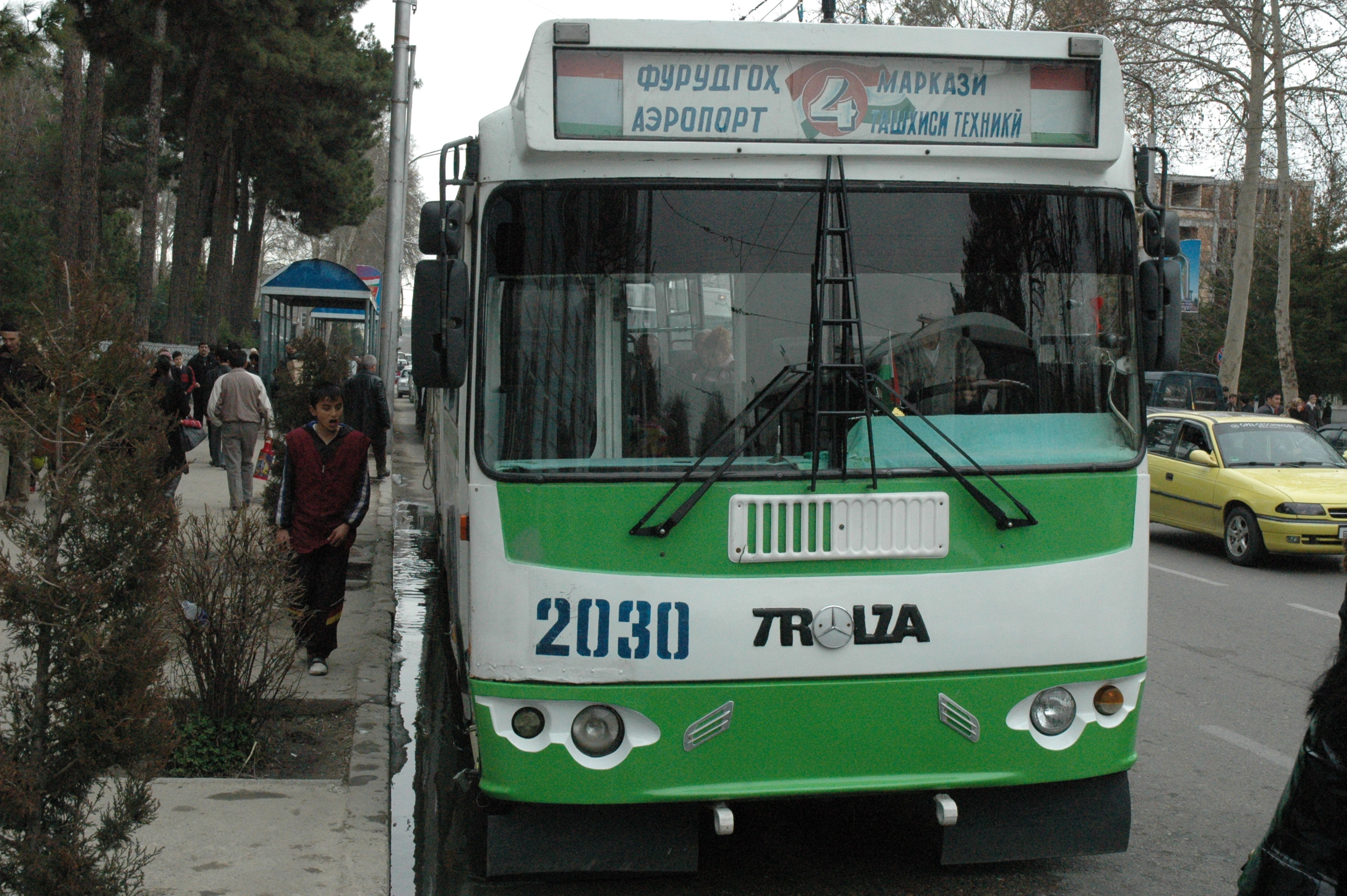
Trolza ZiU-682-016 on route no 4.

As at August 2011, the current fleet of Dushanbe trolleybuses was based upon the standard ZiU-9 trolleybus design:

- TrolZa-5264.01 "Capital" (nos 1000-1003);
- ZiU-682H-016 (012) (nos 1004-1039, 2000-2027);
- ZiU-682H-016 (018) (nos 1042, 1053, 1054, 1058, 1059, 1072-1083, 2038, 2046, 2051-2079);
- ZiU-682V (nos 1177, 2095, 2099).

All Dushanbe trolleybuses are painted in the system's standard white and green livery.

== Depots ==
The Dushanbe system has two depots.

== See also ==
- List of trolleybus systems
