= Uritsky =

Uritsky (masculine), Uritskaya (feminine), or Uritskoye (neuter) may refer to:

- Moisei Uritsky (1873–1918), Russian Bolshevik revolutionary leader
- Uritsky factory (or simply Uritsky), the former name of Trolza, a large trolleybus manufacturer in Russia
- Uritsky District, a district of Oryol Oblast, Russia
- Uritsky (rural locality) (Uritskaya, Uritskoye), name of several rural localities in Russia
