= Trolleybuses in Córdoba =

Public transit system in Córdoba, Argentina

Córdoba trolleybus system
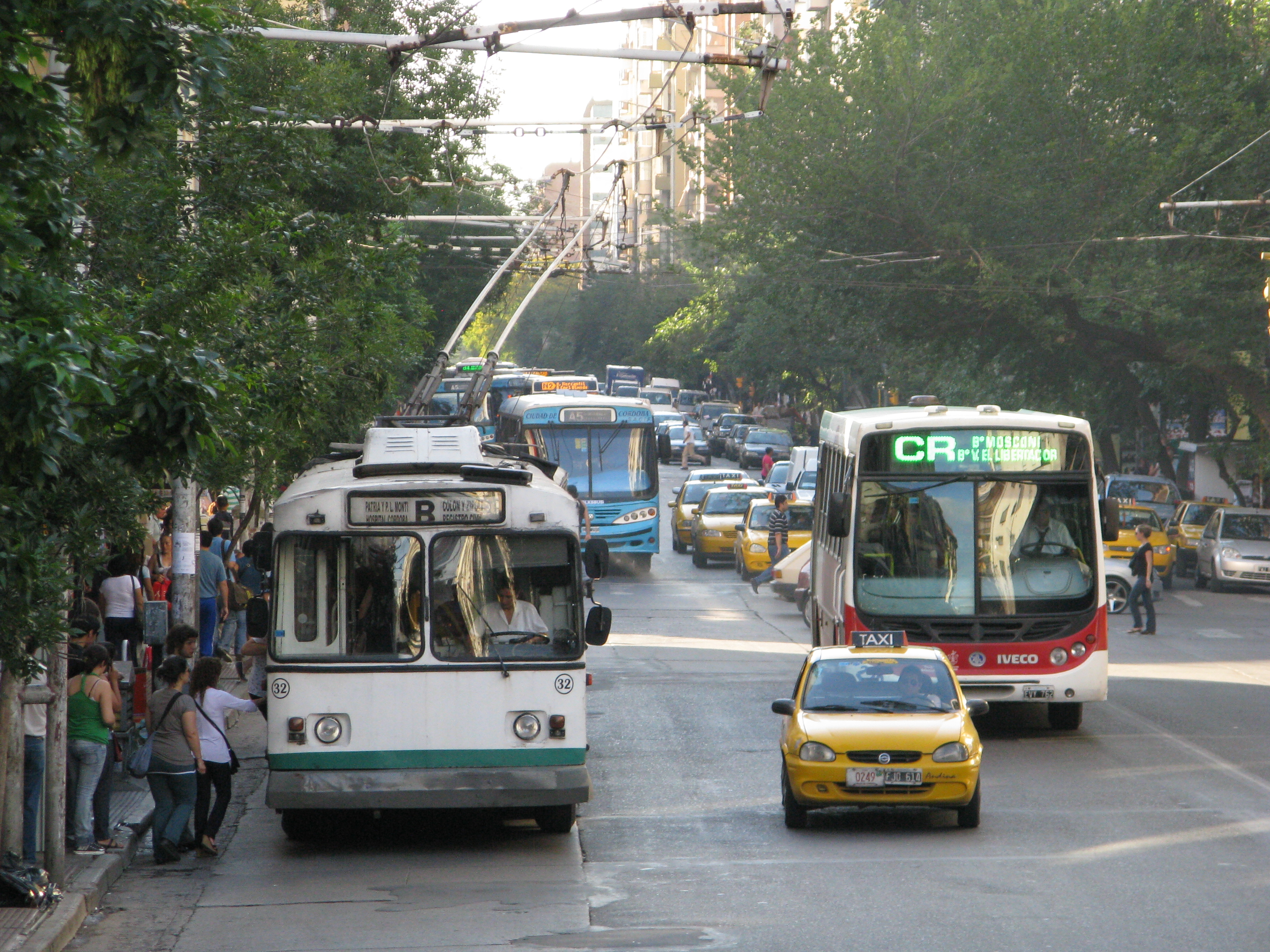
- A ZIU trolleybus in the city centre in 2009

Operation
- Locale: Córdoba, Argentina
- Open: 7 May 1989
- Status: Open
- Routes: 3 (TA, TB, TC)
- Operators: Transporte Automotor Municipal Sociedad del Estado (TAMSE), a municipally owned authority

Statistics
- Website: http://www.tam-se.com.ar/es TAMSE (in Spanish)

The Córdoba trolleybus system (Spanish: Sistema de trolebuses de Córdoba) is part of the public transport network in Córdoba, the capital city of Córdoba Province, Argentina.

Opened in 1989, the system presently comprises three lines, with a total length of approximately 50 km (31 mi).

== History ==
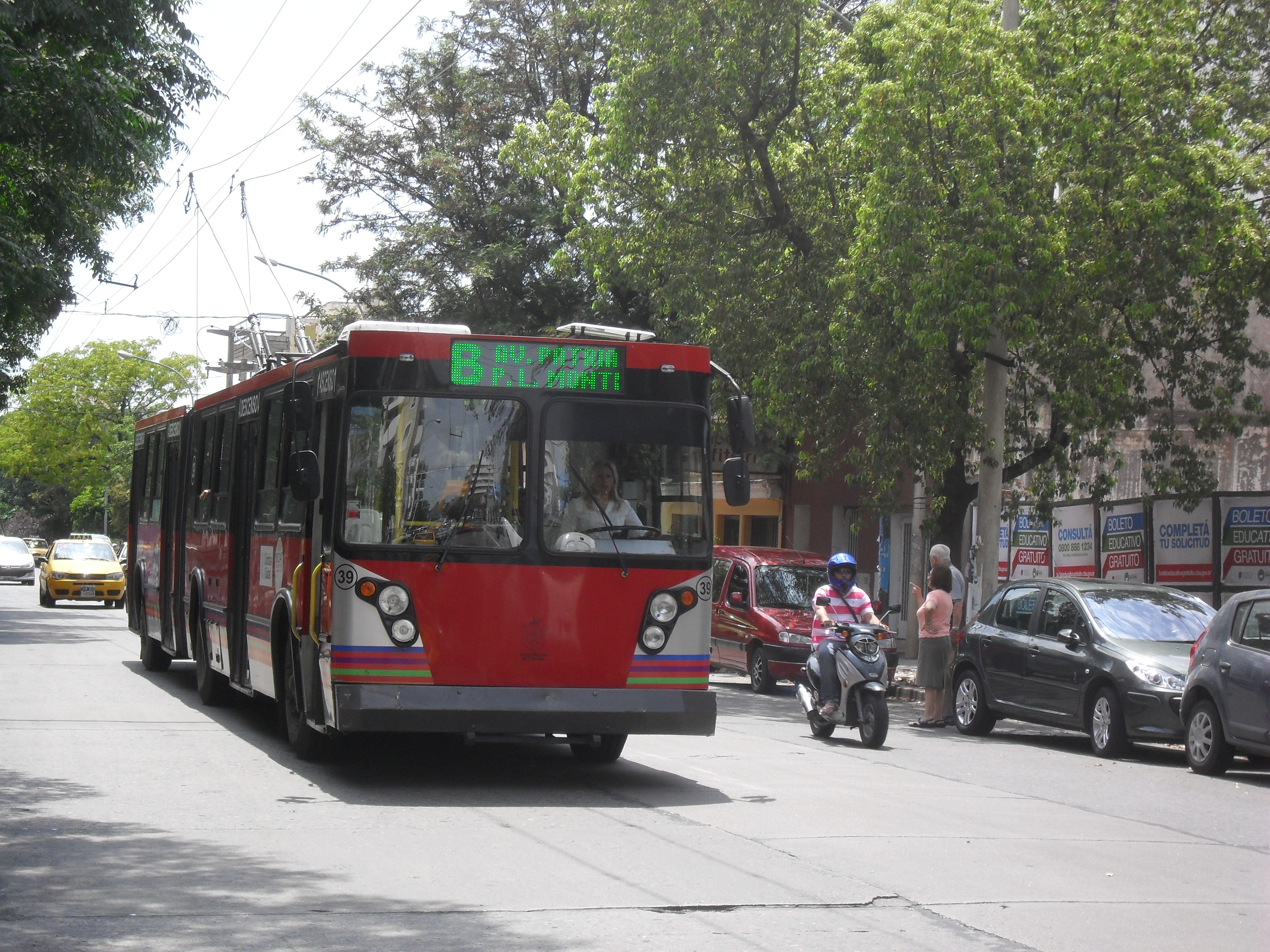
One of Córdoba's 1990 ZiU-10 articulated trolleybuses on line B in 2011. All remaining ZiU-10s in the fleet received a modernised front end and LED destination signs between 2009 and 2011.

As part of an ambitious municipal public transport improvement program, the city of Córdoba decided in the late 1980s to incorporate trolleybuses into Córdoba's urban transport system.

The Soviet firm "VVO Technoexport" was responsible for the turnkey installation of the trolleybus system, which initially used ZiU-9 trolleybuses, model 682b, manufactured in Russia by ZiU (Zavod imeni Uritskogo, now Trolza).

The system opened on 7 May 1989. The first operator was a private company named Expreso Emir S.A., while the municipal government (Municipalid de Córdoba) owned the fixed infrastructure (wiring, support poles, substations).

In 1990, Russian-made ZiU-10 articulated trolleybuses of model 683c were added to the fleet. They incorporated thyristor technology, which ensured more effective control. By 1992, Córdoba had 32 conventional and 12 articulated ZiU-brand trolleybuses. The latter vehicles had a capacity of 46 seats and 166 passengers with a total length of 17.5 m.

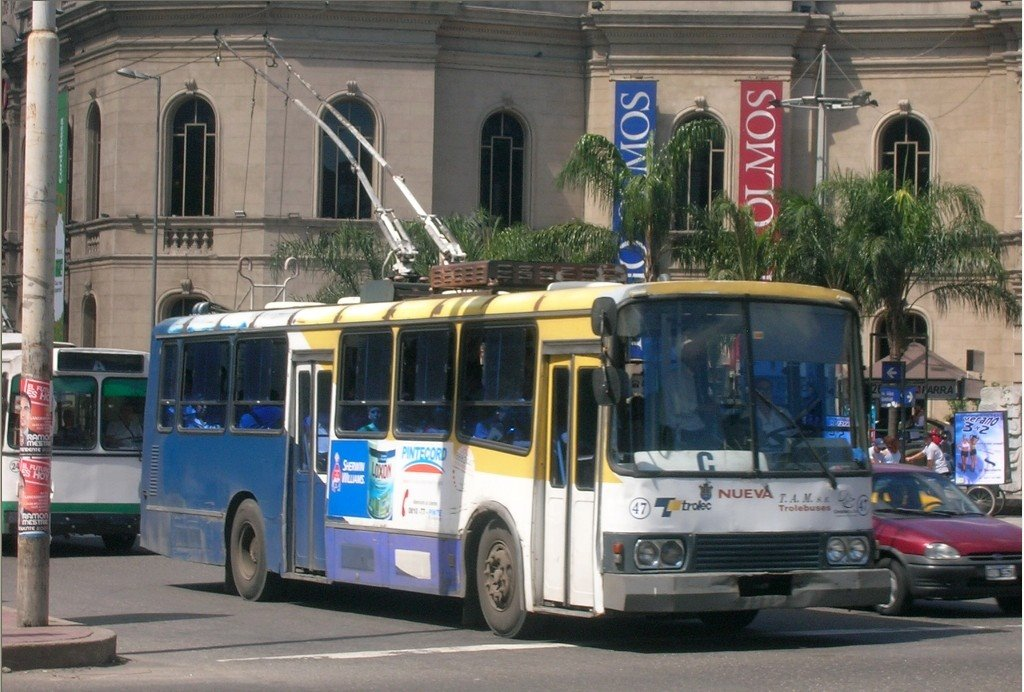
A Norinco trolleybus in Córdoba, near Patio Olmos, in 2007

In 2000, 16 Chinese-built Norinco Shenfeng trolleybuses entered service on the system. These did not last long and were all withdrawn by 2013.

In 2010 a prototype articulated trolleybus by Belkommunmash entered service. The latest fleet renewal occurred in 2015 when 7 Trolza trolleybuses were delivered. These include 5 low-entry vehicles of the type Optima and 2 low-floor vehicles of the type Megapolis.

Although the system's infrastructure has always been owned by the municipality of Córdoba, for many years it was operated and maintained by private companies – from its opening in 1989 until July 2004, with the exception of two briefs periods in 1993 and 1996.

In July 2004, the municipal government took over from then-operator Trolecor out of dissatisfaction with what it deemed to be poor maintenance of the infrastructure and vehicles, under the name Transporte Automotor Municipal Sociedad del Estado (TAMSE), and has continued to operate the system ever since.

Over the years, operation of the system has changed hands several times, as the city awarded the operating concession to a succession of private companies, and sometimes temporarily took over the operation itself, before permanently taking it over in 2004. Operators of the Córdoba trolleybus system have been successively:

- Private company, Expreso Emir S.A.: from 1989 to 1993
- Municipalidad de Córdoba: For "a few months only" circa 1993
- Private company, Transportes Eléctricos Cañadense S.A. (TECSA): from 1993/94 to circa December 1995
- Private company, Dr. M. Belgrano S.A.: Two months only, December 1995–February 1996 (temporary, at the city's request)
- Municipalidad de Córdoba: from February 1996 to late 1997 or 1998
- Private company, Trolecor S.A.: from late 1997 or early 1998 to July 2004
- Municipalidad de Córdoba, under the name Transporte Automotor Municipal Sociedad del Estado (TAMSE): since July 2004

== Lines ==
These are Córdoba's present trolleybus lines:

=== Line A ===

- From Barrio Mariano Fragueiro
- To Plaza las Américas

=== Line B ===

- From Barrio Alto Alberdi
- To Barrio Pueyrredón

=== Line C ===

- From Barrio Ameghino
- To Barrio San Vicente

== Gallery ==
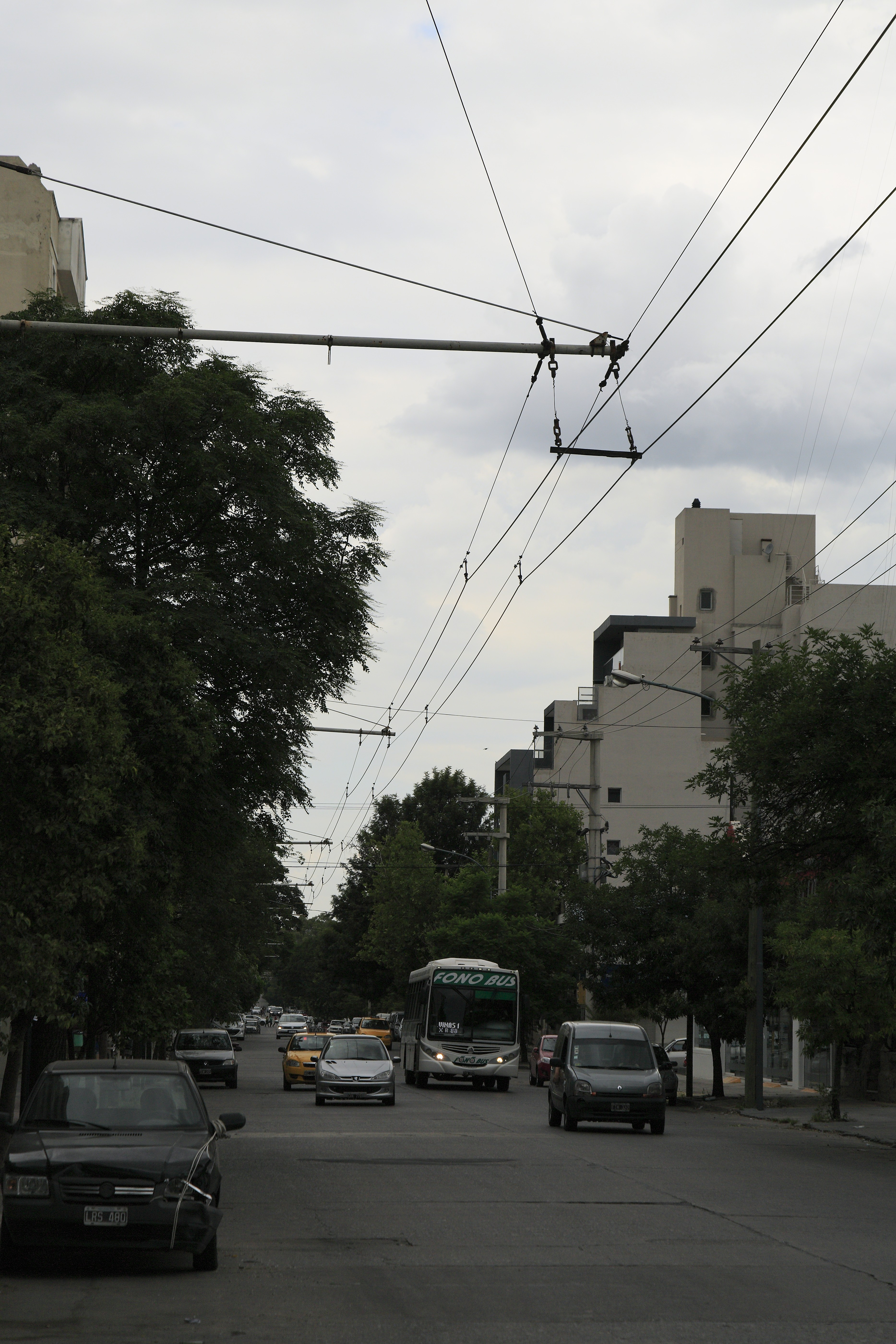
Trolleybus wires along Sarmiento Street

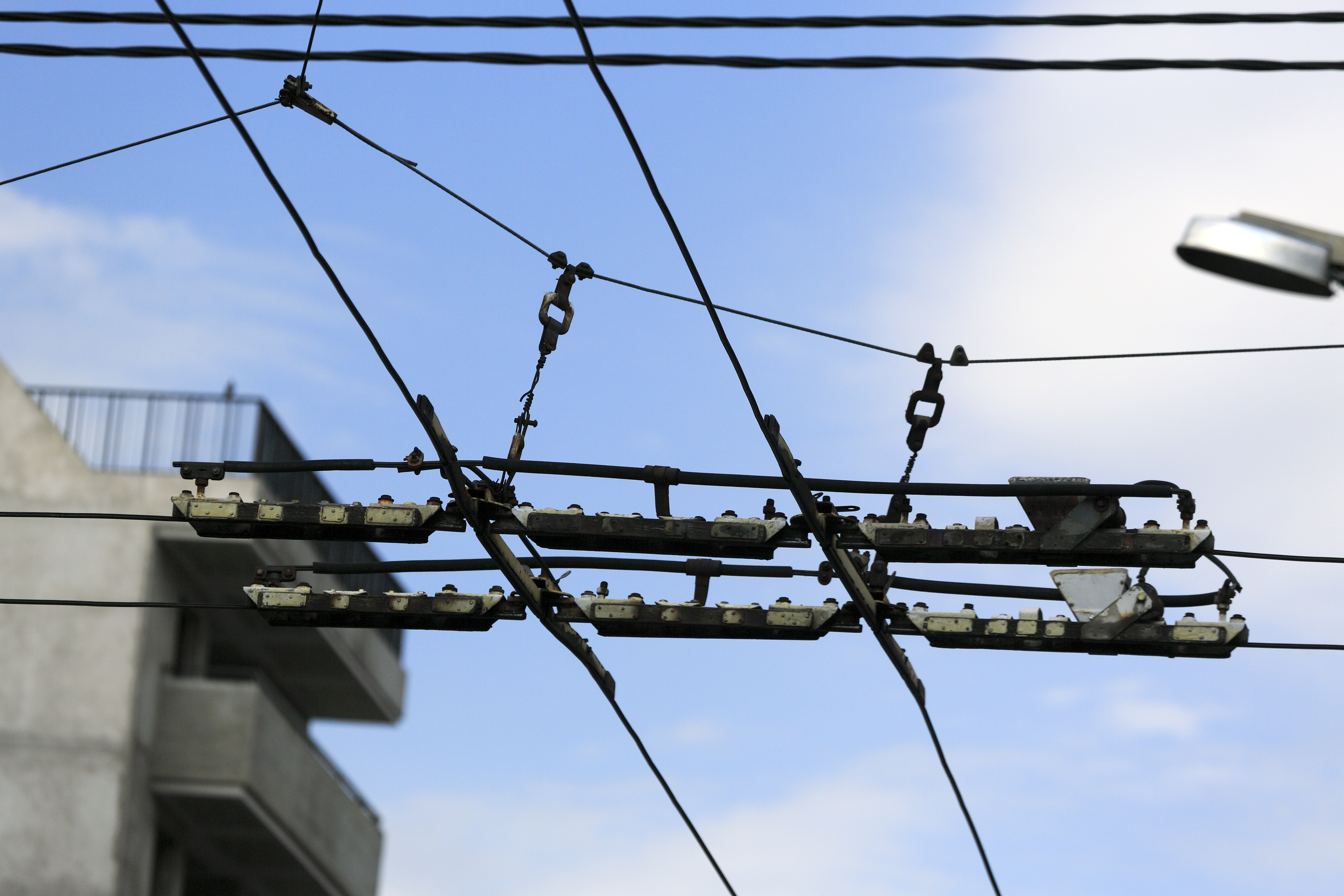
Trolleybus wire intersection

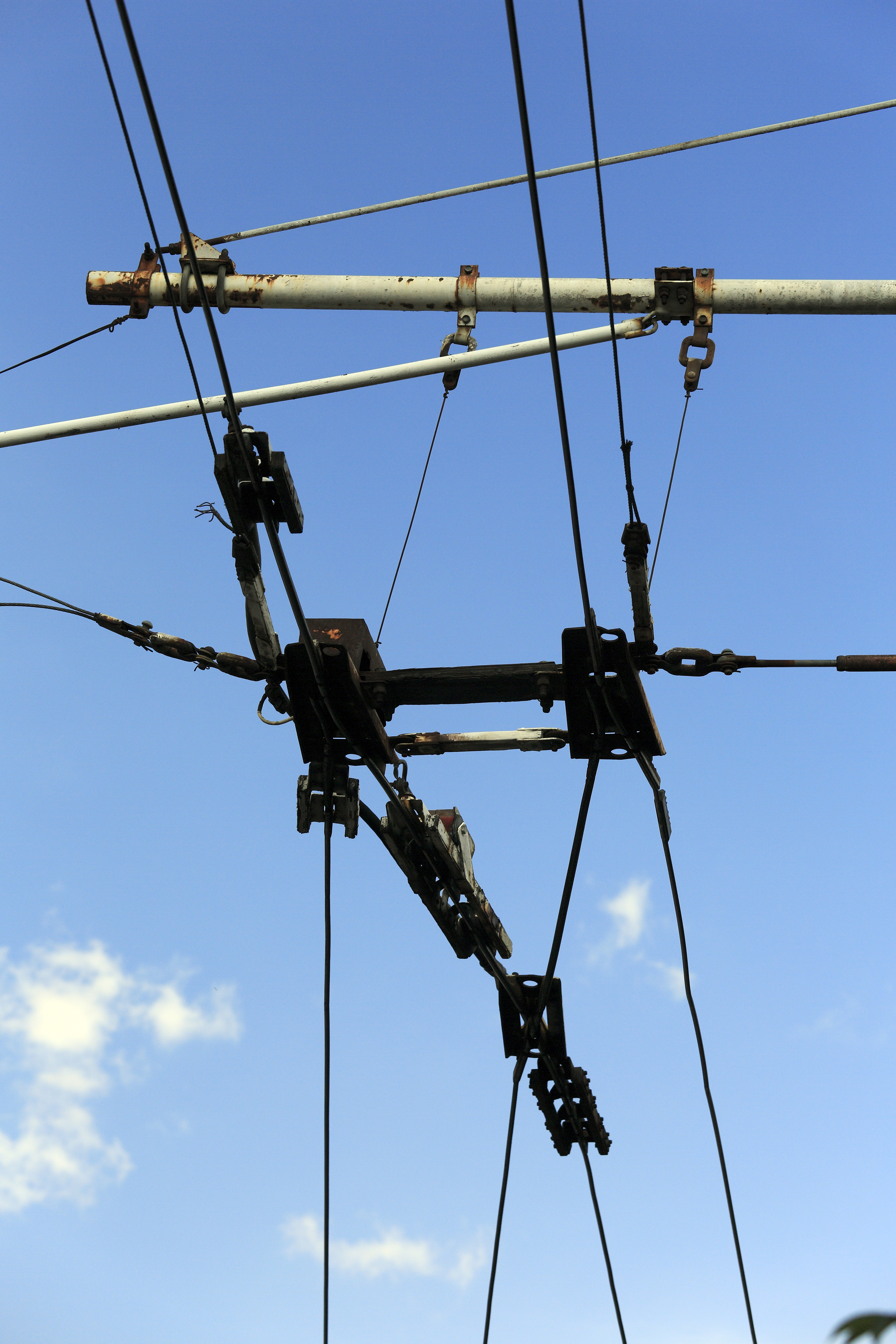
Trolleybus wire switch

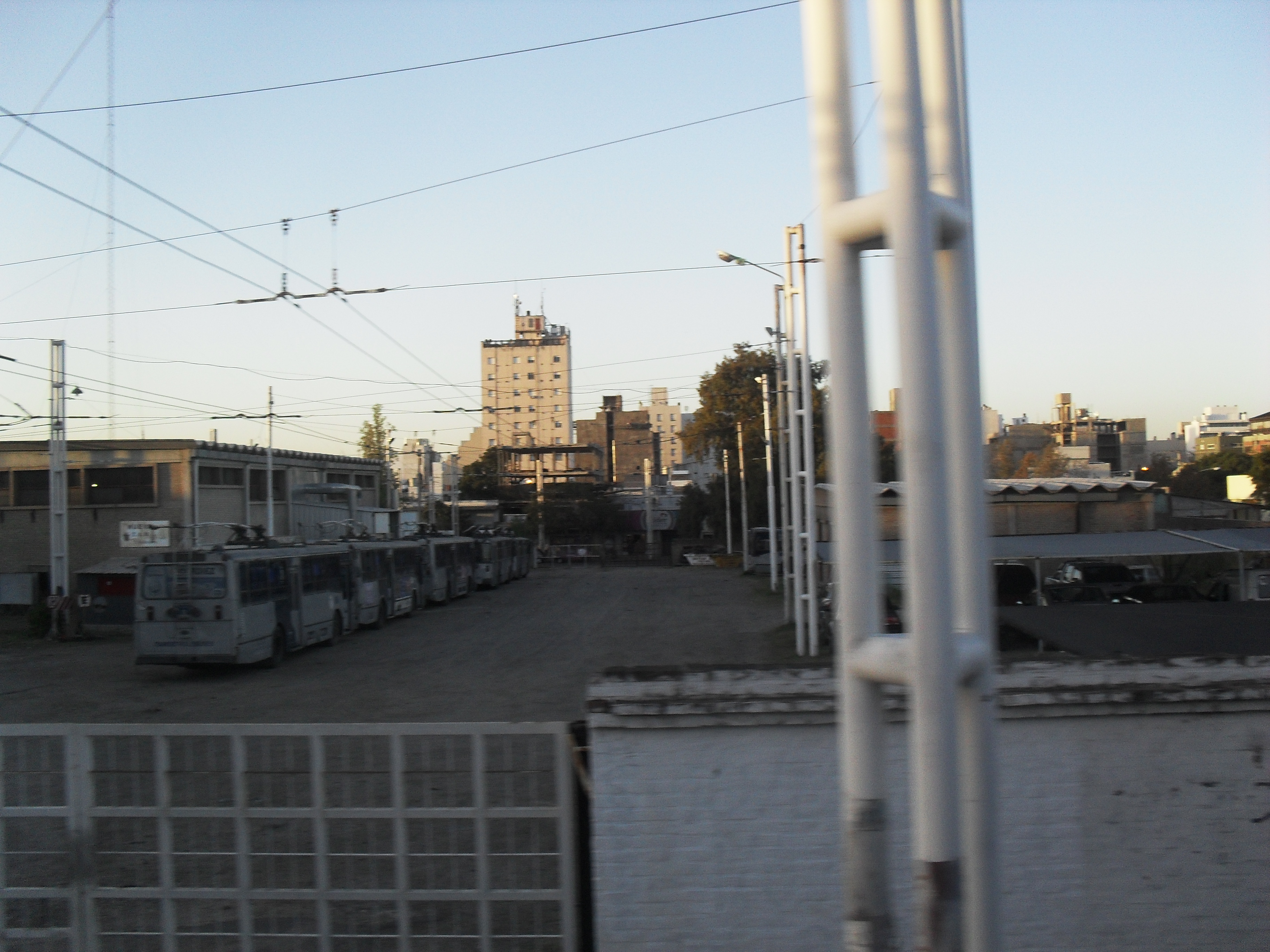
Trolleybus depot

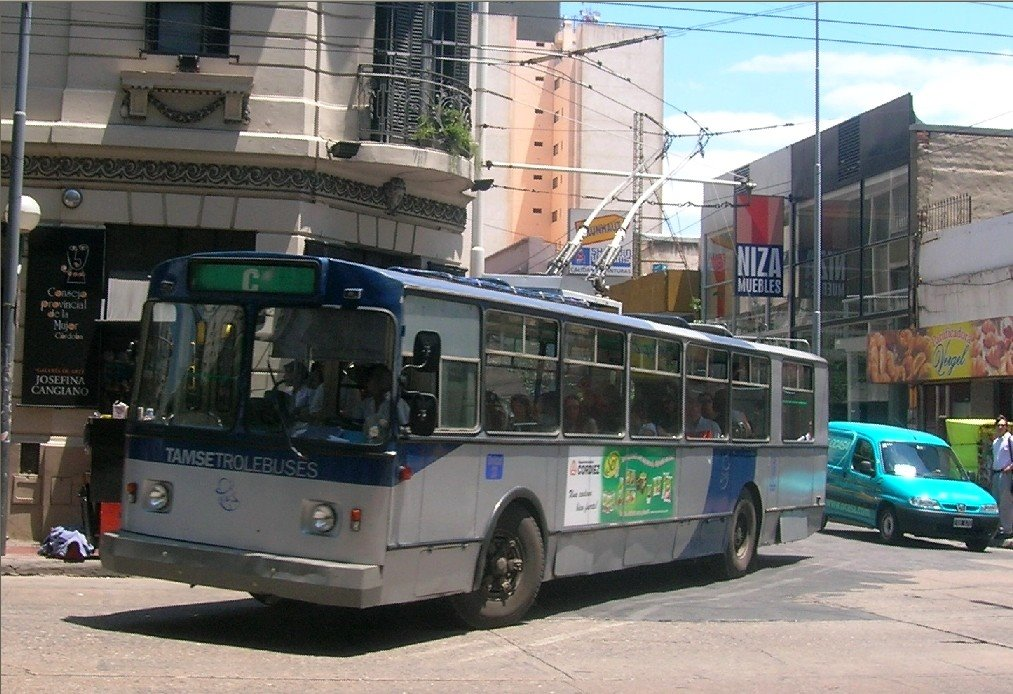
ZiU-9 trolleybus in 2007

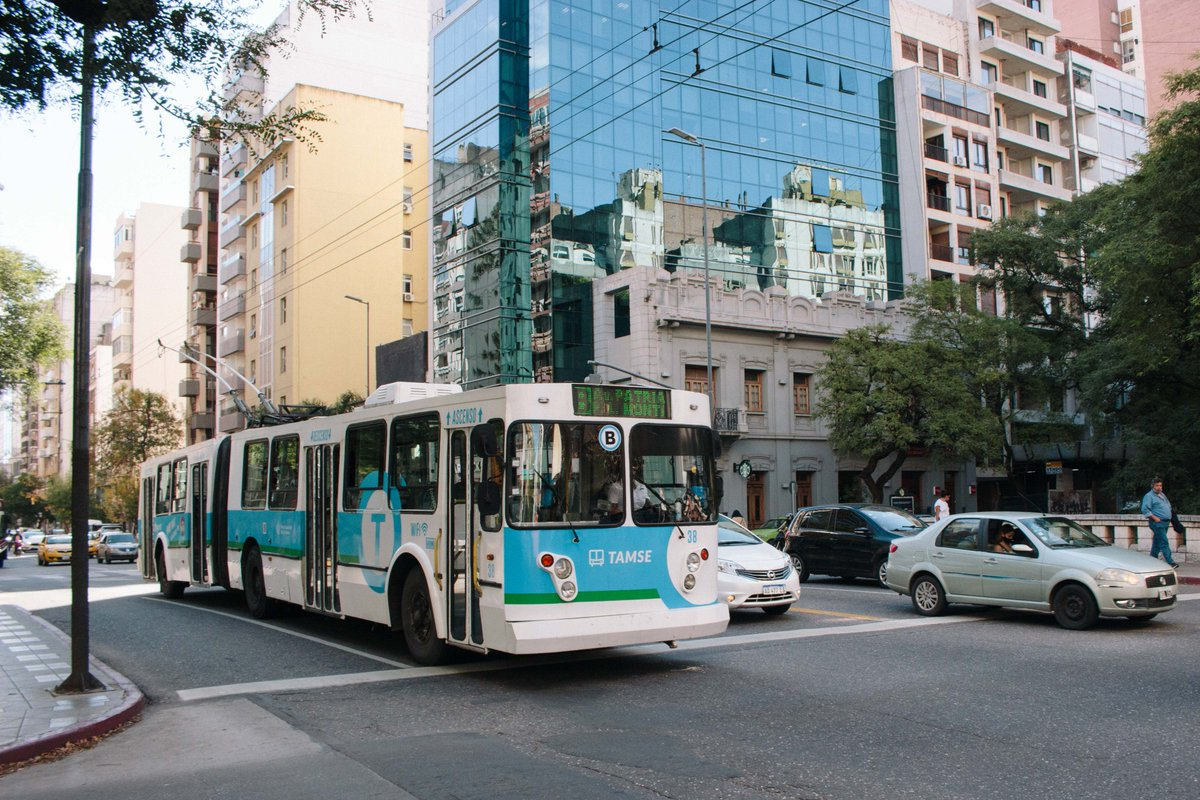
ZIU-10 trolleybus in 2022, wearing the current livery

== See also ==
- Córdoba Metro
- List of trolleybus systems
