= Uritsky (rural locality) =

Set index of articles associated with the same name

Uritsky (Russian: Урицкий; masculine), Uritskaya (Урицкая; feminine), or Uritskoye (Урицкое; neuter) is the name of several rural localities in Russia:

- Uritsky, Bryansk Oblast, a railway crossing loop in Steklyannoraditsky Selsoviet of Bryansky District of Bryansk Oblast
- Uritsky, Oryol Oblast, a settlement in Sergiyevsky Selsoviet of Livensky District of Oryol Oblast
- Uritsky, Ryazan Oblast, a settlement in Karl-Marksovsky Rural Okrug of Sarayevsky District of Ryazan Oblast
- Uritskoye, Leningrad Oblast, a village in Pashskoye Settlement Municipal Formation of Volkhovsky District of Leningrad Oblast
- Uritskoye, Lipetsk Oblast, a selo in Uritsky Selsoviet of Terbunsky District of Lipetsk Oblast
- Uritskoye, Orenburg Oblast, a selo in Petrokhersonetsky Selsoviet of Grachyovsky District of Orenburg Oblast
- Uritskoye, Pskov Oblast, a village in Velikoluksky District of Pskov Oblast
- Uritskoye, Ryazan Oblast, a village in Ukhorsky Rural Okrug of Spassky District of Ryazan Oblast
- Uritskoye, Sakha Republic, a selo in Uritsky Rural Okrug of Olyokminsky District of the Sakha Republic
- Uritskoye, Saratov Oblast, a selo in Lysogorsky District of Saratov Oblast
- Uritskoye, Tver Oblast, a village in Svapushchenskoye Rural Settlement of Ostashkovsky District of Tver Oblast
- Uritskoye, Belozersky District, Vologda Oblast, a selo in Paninsky Selsoviet of Belozersky District of Vologda Oblast
- Uritskoye, Nikolsky District, Vologda Oblast, a village in Milofanovsky Selsoviet of Nikolsky District of Vologda Oblast
