= Lysye Gory =

Lysye Gory (Russian: Лысые Горы) is the name of several inhabited localities in Russia.

Urban localities

- Lysye Gory, Saratov Oblast, a work settlement in the Lysogorsky District of Saratov Oblast

Rural localities

- Lysye Gory, Tambov Oblast, a selo in the Lysogorsky Selsoviet of Tambovsky District of Tambov Oblast
