= Lysogorsky (rural locality) =

Lysogorsky (Russian: Лысогорский; masculine), Lysogorskaya (Лысогорская; feminine), or Lysogorskoye (Лысогорское; neuter) is the name of several rural localities in Russia:

- Lysogorsky, Stavropol Krai, a khutor in Perevalnensky Selsoviet of Mineralovodsky District of Stavropol Krai
- Lysogorsky, Ulyanovsk Oblast, a settlement in Podkurovsky Rural Okrug of Terengulsky District of Ulyanovsk Oblast
- Lysogorsky, Volgograd Oblast, a khutor in Bubnovsky Selsoviet of Uryupinsky District of Volgograd Oblast
- Lysogorskaya, a stanitsa in Georgiyevsky District of Stavropol Krai
