= ZiU-10 =

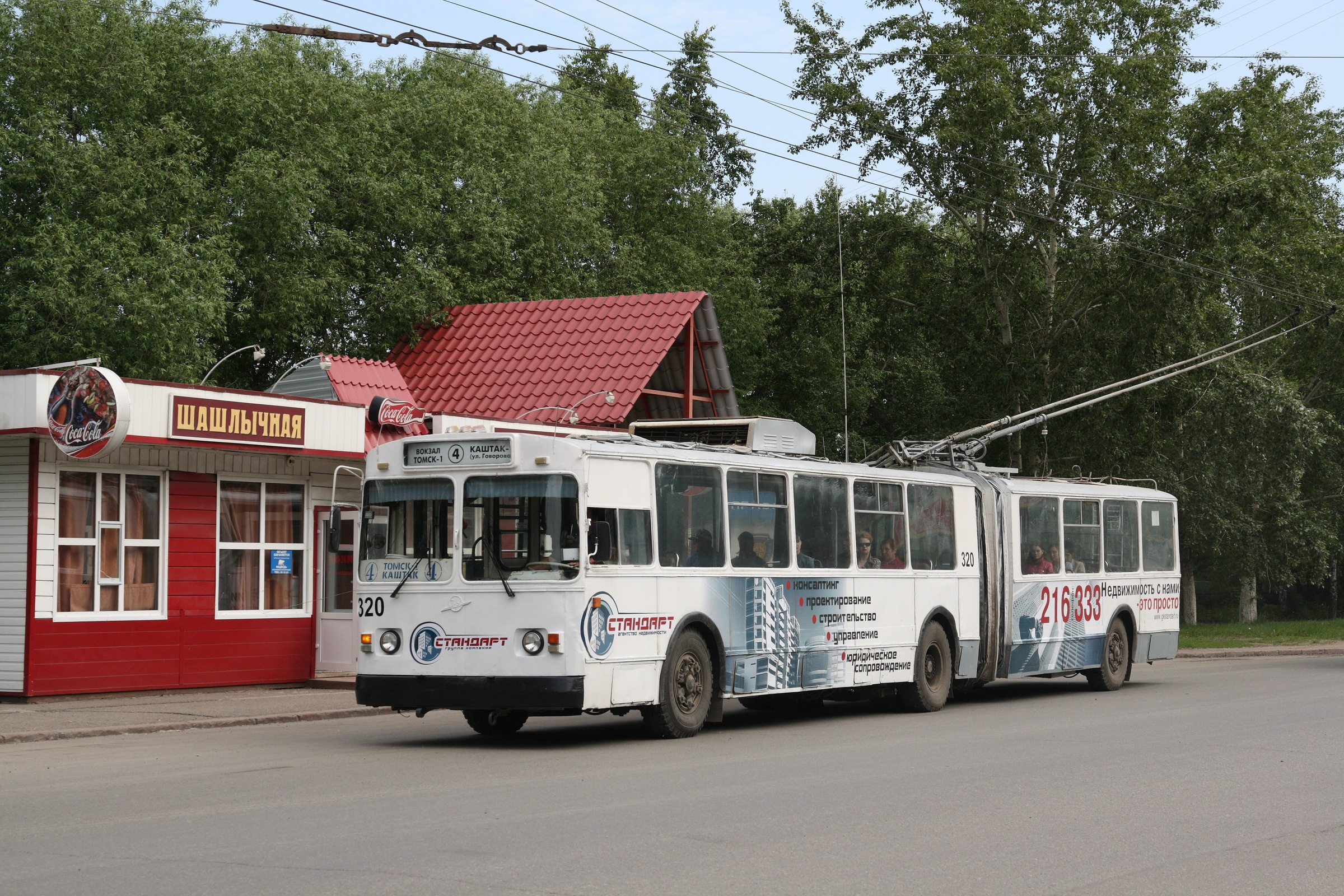
A ZiU-10 in Tomsk

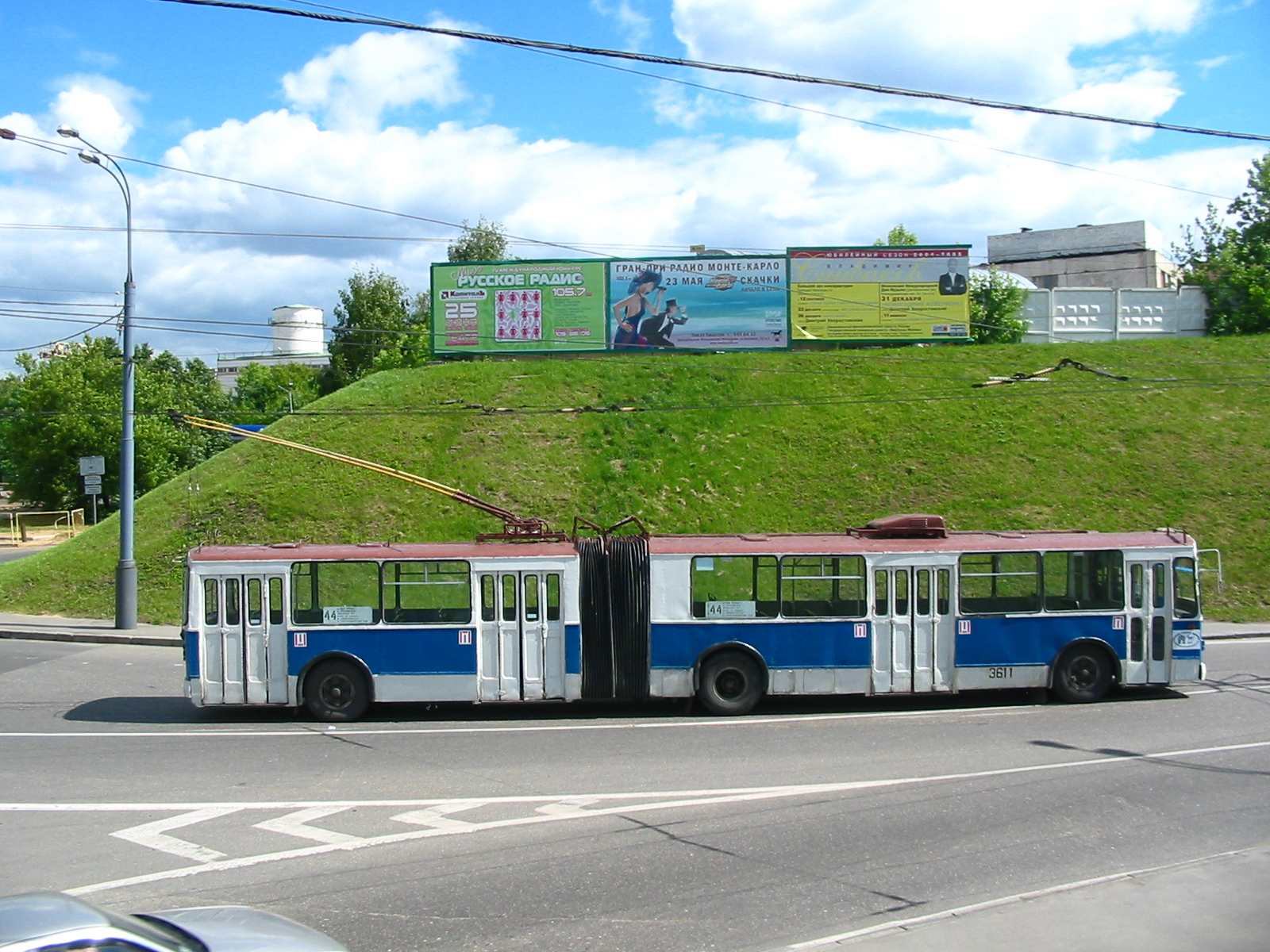
Moscow ZiU-10 side view

ZiU-10 (Zavod imeni Uritskogo, Russian for Uritsky Factory) or ZIU-10 (Russian: ЗиУ-10), also referred to as ZIU-6205, is a model of trolleybus, built in Russia. It was manufactured from 1986 until 2008 by the Uritsky Factory, in Engels, which later became Trolza. It is an articulated, three-axle variant of the ZiU-9/ZiU-682.

The ZiU-6205 was equipped with a Thyristor control system that produced a buzzing noise when accelerating or decelerating, with a weak-field at 40km/h. It had an improved dashboard with smaller air system pressure gauges and the speedometer being the primary gauge.
