= Uritskoye, Nikolsky District, Vologda Oblast =

Uritskoye Урицкое
- Village
- Location within Vologda Oblast Location within Russia
- Coordinates: 59°55′N 44°52′E
- Country: Russia
- Region: Vologda Oblast
- District: Nikolsky District
- Time zone: UTC+3:00

Uritskoye (Russian: Урицкое) is a rural locality (a village) in Zelentsovskoye Rural Settlement, Nikolsky District, Vologda Oblast, Russia. The population was 35 as of 2002.

== Geography ==
Uritskoye is located 63 km northwest of Nikolsk (the district's administrative centre) by road. Shirokaya is the nearest rural locality.
