= Lysogorsky, Volgograd Oblast =

Lysogorsky Лысогорский
- Khutor
- Location within Volgograd Oblast Location within Russia
- Coordinates: 50°55′N 41°54′E
- Country: Russia
- Region: Volgograd Oblast
- District: Uryupinsky District
- Time zone: UTC+4:00

Lysogorsky (Russian: Лысогорский) is a rural locality (a khutor) in Bubnovskoye Rural Settlement, Uryupinsky District, Volgograd Oblast, Russia. The population was 90 as of 2010. There are 2 streets.

== Geography ==
Lysogorsky is located on the right bank of the Khopyor River, 30 km northwest of Uryupinsk (the district's administrative centre) by road. Mikhaylovskaya is the nearest rural locality.
