= Lysye Gory, Saratov Oblast =

Lysye Gory Лысые Горы
- Urban-type settlement
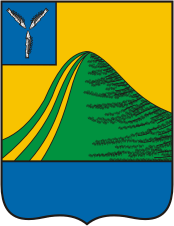
- Coat of arms
- Interactive map of Lysye Gory
- Location of Lysye Gory Lysye Gory (Saratov Oblast)
- Coordinates: 51°32′40″N 44°50′20″E
- Country: Russia
- Federal subject: Saratov Oblast
- Administrative district: Lysogorsky District
- Founded: 1750

Population (2010 Census)
  - Total: 7,180
  - Estimate (2021): 6,852 (−4.6%)
- Time zone: UTC+4 (MSK+1)
- Postal code: 412861
- OKTMO ID: 63625151051

Lysye Gory (Russian: Лы́сые Го́ры) is an urban locality (an urban-type settlement) in Lysogorsky District of Saratov Oblast, Russia. Population: 7,180 (2010 census); 7,557 (2002 census); 7,436 (1989 Soviet census).
