= ZiU-9 =

Soviet and Russian trolleybus

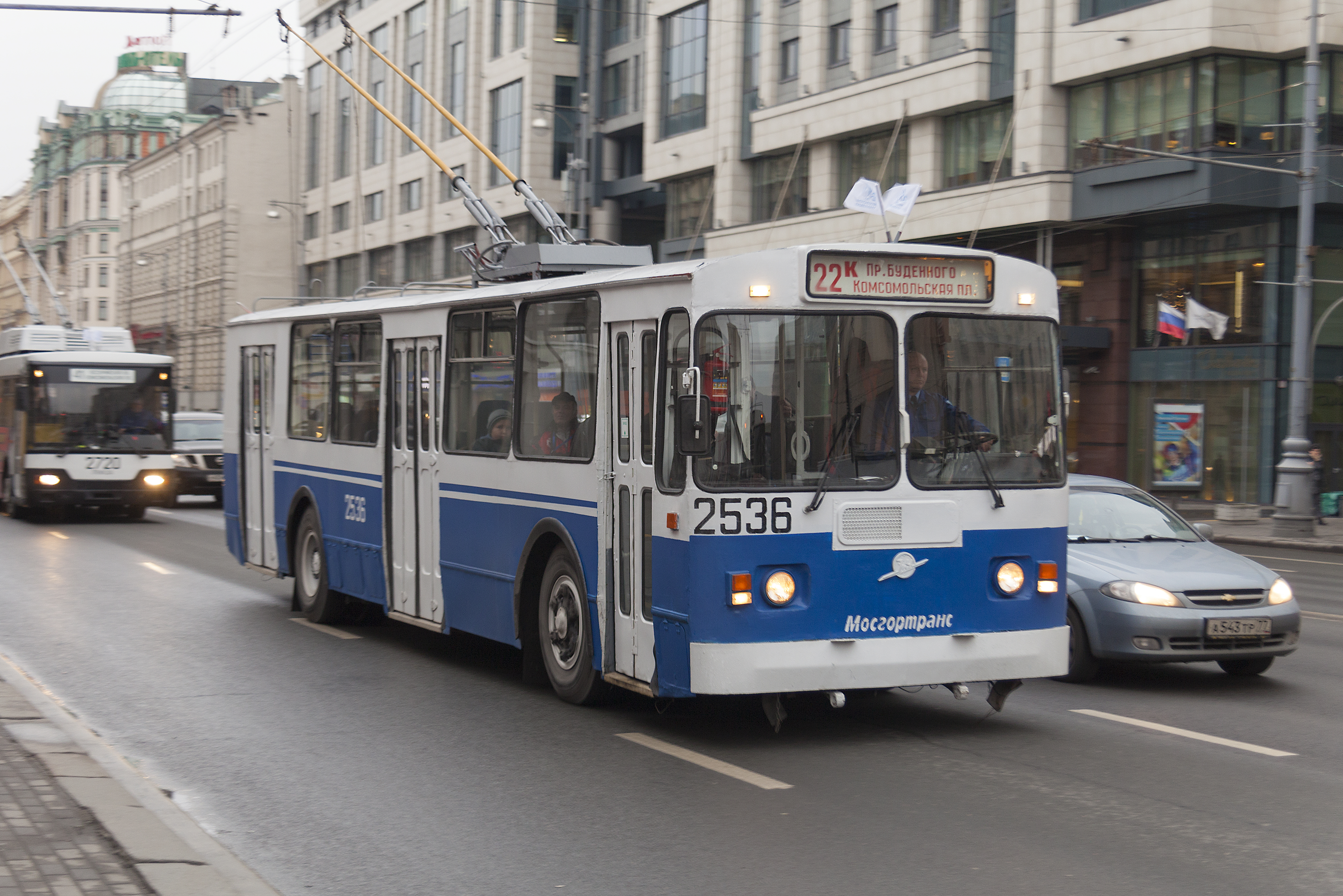
A 1st gen ZiU-9 trolleybus in Moscow, Russia

ZiU-9, or ZIU-9 (Cyrillic: ЗиУ-9) is a Soviet (and later Russian) trolleybus. Other names for the ZiU-9 are ZiU-682 and HTI-682 (Cyrillic: ЗиУ-682 and ХТИ-682). The ZiU acronym stands for "Zavod imeni Uritskogo", (Uritsky Factory, named after Russian revolutionary Moisei Uritsky). Before 1996 this acronym was also a trademark of the vehicle manufacturer Trolza. The ZiU-9 was first built in 1966, although it was only put into mass production in 1972 and it was still assembled along with other more advanced trolleybus vehicles in the Trolza (former ZiU) factory until 2015. The total number of produced ZiU-9s exceeds 42,000 vehicles making it the most produced trolleybus in the world. Many copies of the ZiU-9 were made in other factories of the former Soviet bloc. Following the Soviet era, many cities still utilize the ZiU-9 as their primary trolleybus; for example Cheboksary, Ryazan, Vinnitsa and others.

== History and development ==
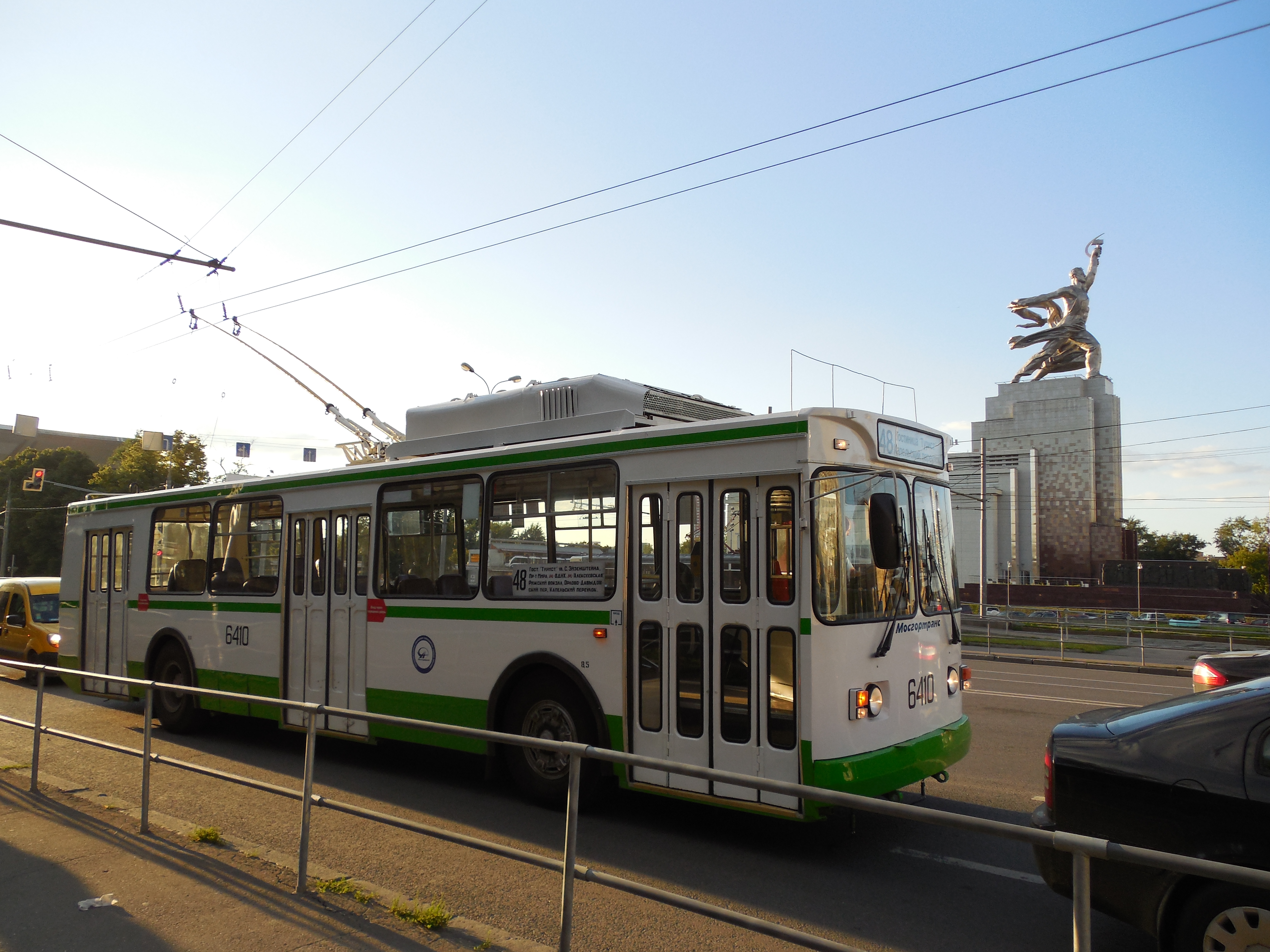
ZiU-682GM1 operating in Moscow, Russia

The development of trolleybus systems in the Soviet Union boomed in the 1960s due to an urgent need to update the trolleybus fleet. The mainstay of the contemporary Soviet trolleybus fleet, the ZiU-5, was not sufficient for large urban passenger transfers as it was more suited for medium-size cities rather than large megapolises such as Moscow or Saint Petersburg. In addition, the ZiU-5 had an aluminium exterior, which was expensive and complicated from a technological point of view. The two doors in the ZiU-5 hull ends did not work well in overcrowded situations which were quite common in Soviet public transportation.

The ZiU-9 was a quite successful attempt to solve these problems. It has one extra door compared to the ZiU-5. The middle and rear doors are wider, to allow for enhanced passenger flow. The small door at the front end of the vehicle is smaller, yet nonetheless comfortable for the driver and for outgoing passengers. The exterior of the ZiU-9 is made of welded steel and is significantly cheaper and simpler than the exterior of the ZiU-5.

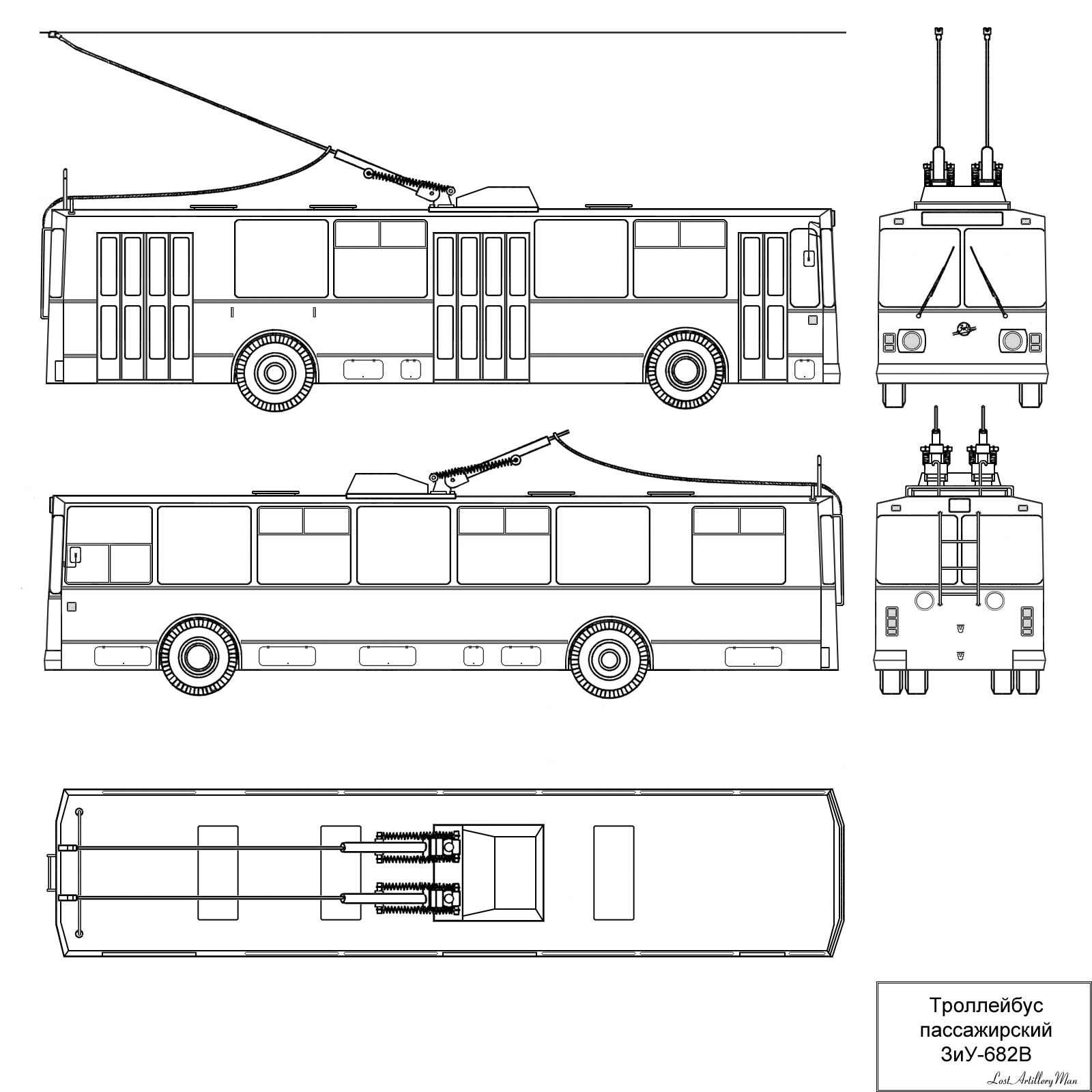
a diagram of ZiU-9

The electrical equipment of the ZiU-9 had some minor differences from the ZiU-5. The power of the main motor was increased. The indirect resistor-based power control system was slightly modified to deal with the increased power of the traction motor. While western designers developed new semiconductor-based control devices, Soviet engineers decided to retain the old resistor-based system for ease of maintenance. The first prototype vehicles were tested in Moscow in 1971 and were approved for mass production after some minor design adjustments.

The '9' in the vehicle name was the initial project index of the design team. However, after launching mass production, the new trolleybus received a new index, '682' from the unified classification of non-rail public transport vehicles. All series went by the ZiU-682 designation, but the number '682' proved difficult to pronounce and the shorter '9' still lives in the everyday language of drivers and servicemen. In 1986, a new classification was introduced and the former ZiU-682 was designated as HTI-682. However, this was not the end of the vehicle's cycle of renaming; the Russian acronym HTI in the Cyrillic alphabet is ХТИ, and these three Cyrillic letters in 1995 were confused with the Latin letters XTU which then became the official name of the vehicle.

== Production ==
=== ZiU-9 ===
The first prototype, ZiU-9, was built in 1966, with the second prototype being built in 1970. Elements of the appearance and number of design decisions were borrowed from contemporary to the time foreign firms MAN and Chausson.

=== ZiU-9A ===
The ZiU-9A was an experimental version with a wide body up to 2680 mm. With one prototype made in 1968.

=== ZiU-682B ===
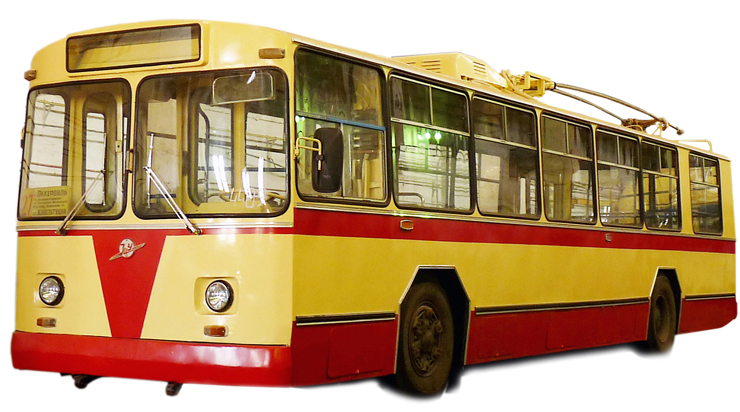
Angled view of a ZiU-9

In August 1972, the first production series, the ZiU-682B, began production. Early trolley cars differed from later releases. Models prior to 1974 had angular wheel arches rather than circular ones. The first batch of trolleybuses used the outdated DC-207G engine, which was replaced by the DC-210 110 kW engine in 1973. Suspension on the first ZiU-682B was pneumatic, with track bars as guiding elements (which were later replaced with leaf springs). The rear area had a lowered floor, to reduce the number of steps at the back door, thus allowing the loading of wheelchairs, prams, and large items. However, this "advantage" was leveled by a high handrail on the steps separating the rear and middle doors. The transition from a high floor in the cabin to a lower back floor was facilitated by sloping the aisle between the rear wheel arches, which caused inconvenience to passengers at peak hours (especially in winter), standing on an icy ramp. In 1991 developers replaced the high-speed separator handrail attached to the door, but by this time all storage sites were at three stages from sidewalk level. For natural ventilation, the roof of the cabin was equipped with four ceiling hatches, and sliding side window panes. Currently, the only instance of ZIU-9B is preserved and operated in the city of Zaporozhye and has the side number 562.

=== ZiU-682V (B00/B0A) ===
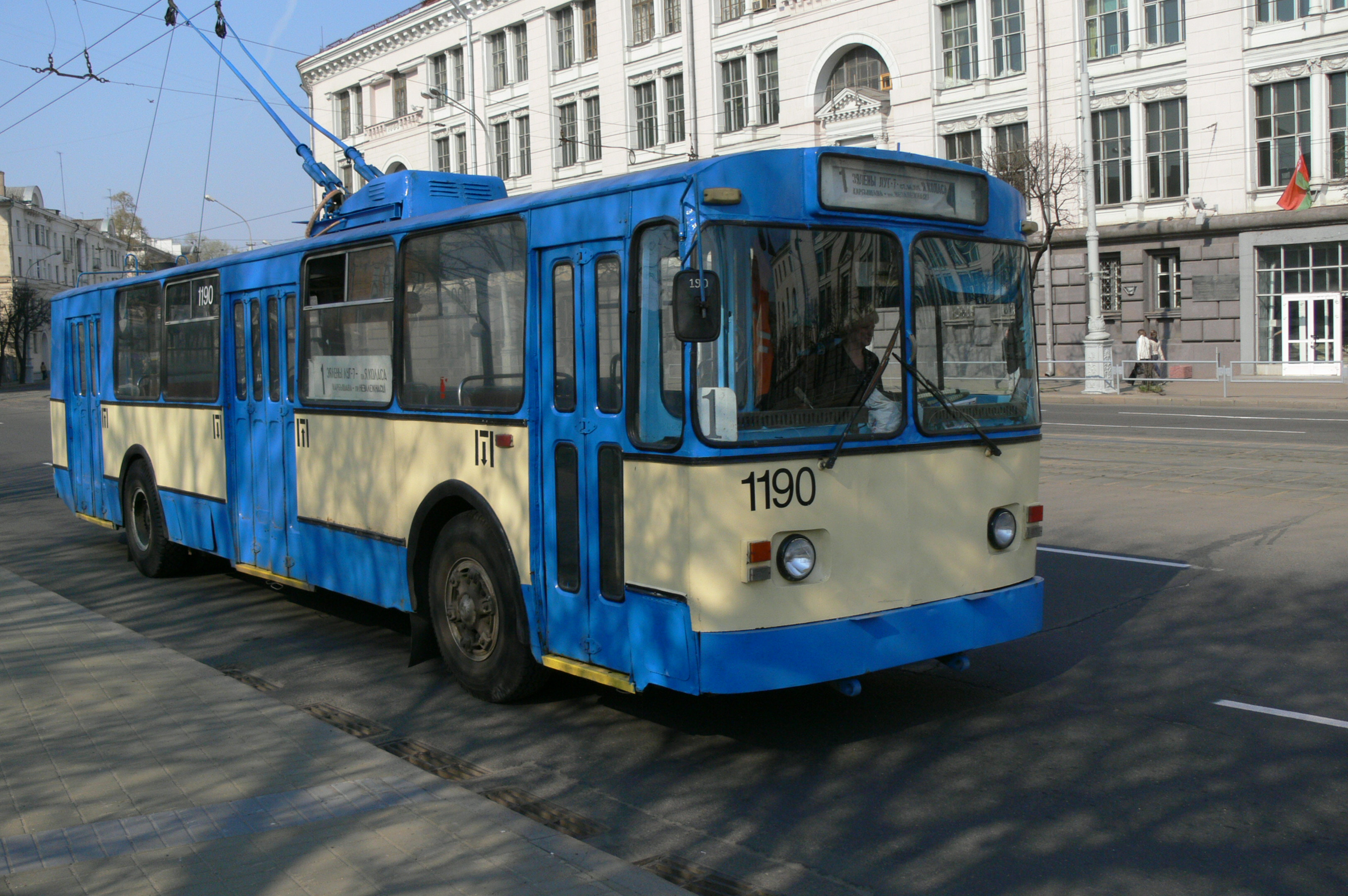
Trolleybus ZiU-682v in Minsk, Belarus

At the end of 1976, mass production of the updated ZiU-682V began, which replaced the ZiU-682B, the key difference being leaf springs instead of track bars. Since 1976, the number of fixtures in the cabin has been reduced from 12 to 11, every other window in the cabin lost air vents. Since 1978, front ceiling hatch was removed, and the pole storage hooks became electric powered.

Since 1983, changed the shape and location of the front and rear position lamps. Lights original form, informally called "boats" have been replaced by unified and offset edges closer to route indicators. In 1985, similar design changes underwent external signal lights and turn indicators.

From March through May 1984 trolleybuses were produced without the low-level rear accumulation area, which was due to the need to strengthen the base structure of the body in the rear overhang. In 1985, the nameplate trolley was partially aligned with the standards forming the VIN code, which led to a change in marking HTI682V00.

Since 1988, the plant switched to production modifications ZiU- 682V -012 (ZiU- 682V0A) powered DC -213 capacity of 115 kW. Since 1989, the electrical noise filters shroud became smaller and flatter. In 1989, production started in parallel transition modification ZiU- 682V0B on which the electric drive door opener was replaced with a pneumatic system.

=== ZiU-682G ===
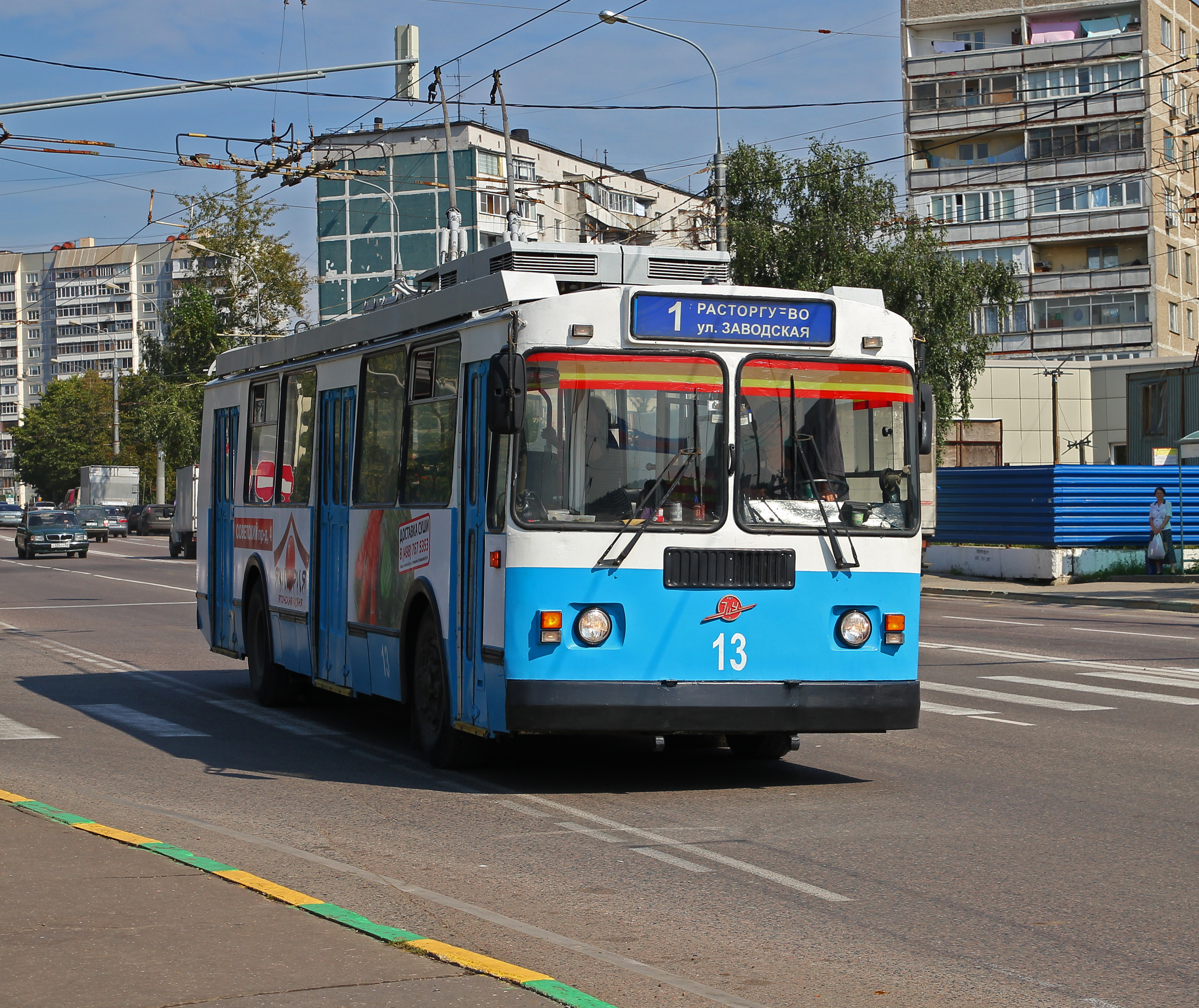
A trolleybus on Leninskogo Komsomola Avenue in Vidnoye, Moscow Oblast, Russia

By the end of 1980, individual trolley components manufactured at that time were almost 20 years old, making them significantly outdated. Therefore, simultaneously with the launch of a series of recent modifications to the ZiU- 682V, preparations were made to produce a more profound modernization of the model trolley, which was designated ZiU- 682G. Experienced instances ZiU- 682G were released in 1988, and since February 1, 1991, the plant has fully passed on its production.

In addition to the changes already introduced earlier models ZiU 682V0A - and - ZiU 682V0B model ZiU- 682G have received the following differences. Front, under the windshield, placed the intake grille. Changed the location of windows with vents along the starboard side. Undergone significant redevelopment salon trolley. Most of the seats along the left side of the body were replaced with a double row on row, which increased the number of standing places. Changed the design of seats themselves and their handrails. Big changes undergone cab. Partition behind the driver, which had previously oval window became deaf; extended sliding door in the driver's cabin. In the cabin itself changed the layout of the dashboard, which became made of black plastic. Control of external light devices was moved to the steering column. On a dedicated right panel were only control door opening, the wiper switch, and the alarm. Other switches were transferred to the new control panel by trolley to the left of the driver's side near the window. Redesigned suspension and brake pedals at the same time control approached the car.

On the other hand, the ZiU- 682G was supplied to provincial towns from 1993 to 2000. Compared to the previous model, the ZiU- 682V had significantly lighter load-bearing elements of the frame component of the supporting frame (apparently, to reduce cost). As a result, in severe operating conditions (e.g. in Nizhny Novgorod) over 5 years, these structural elements had a tendency to corrode to the extent that they could be punctured with the gentle tap of a screwdriver. Since 1997, the base modification in mass production became ZiU- 682G -012 (ZiU- 682G0A). An external difference between the new modification was the reduced height of the cab's side window, which also has another location pane. Minor changes have been planning the cabin. It was adapted for the domestic market modification export version trolley ZiU- 682G -010, the production of which began in 1992.

Based on ZiU- 682G -012 began the further modernization of trolley conducted mainly commissioned Mosgortransa (as most other Russian cities at that time became insolvent) and divided into several stages. For low voltage power generator instead of 63.3701 and auxiliary engine DC - 661B was set low noise static converter. Been improved waterproofing and grounding. The trolleybuses began to possess higher corrosion protection, a number of components now composed of aluminum, stainless steel, and fiberglass. In parallel with ZiU- 682G -012, in 1998, production began for the transition to modification ZiU- 682G -014 (ZiU- 682G0E), which replaced the old sofas in the lounge with individual padded seats, applied laser (source?) Heaters cabin windows. This version is also equipped with a static converter.

=== ZiU-682G-016, 017 and 018 ===
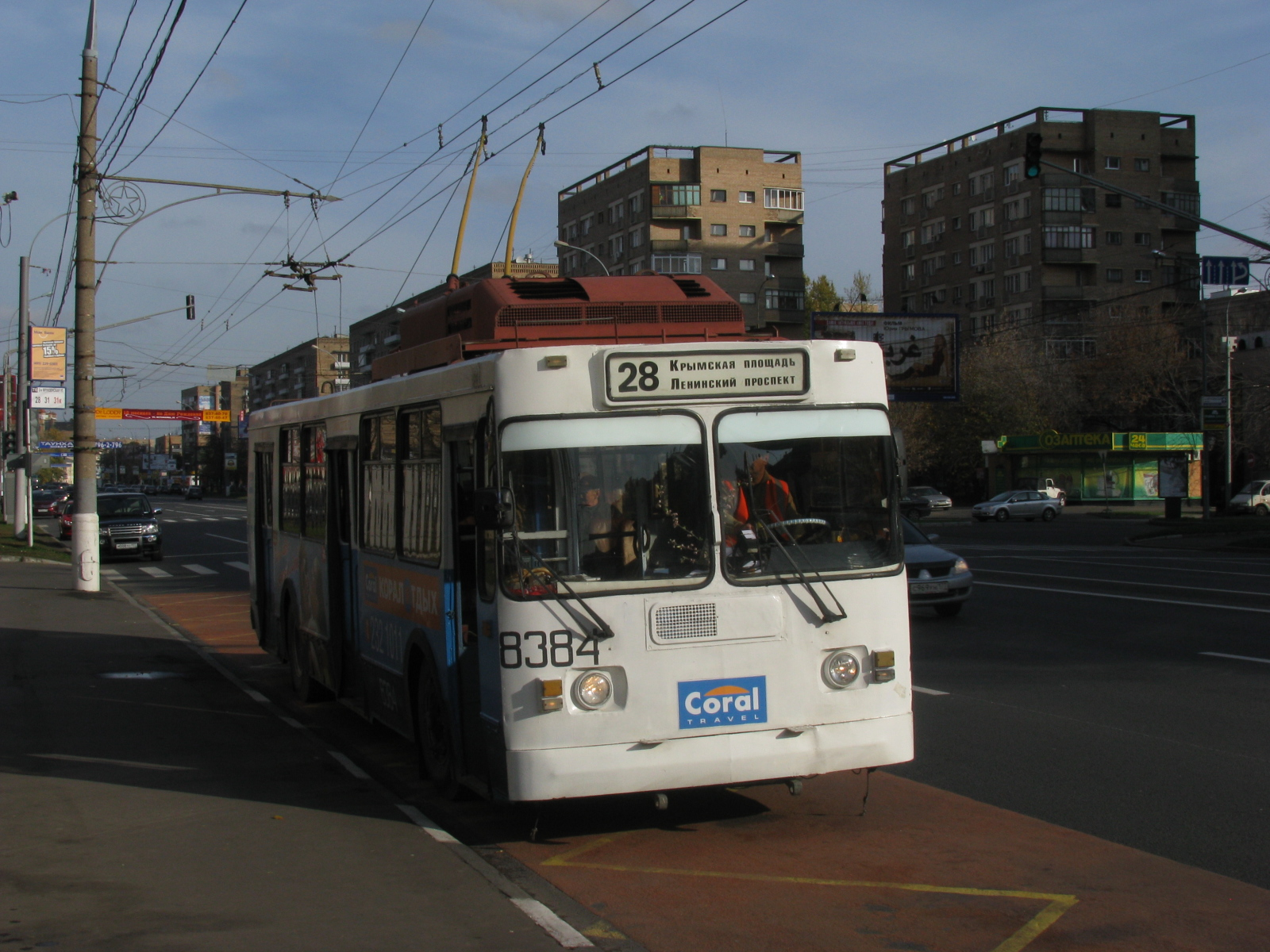
Trolleybus ZiU-682GM1, at the Moscow trolleybus-repair plant (MTRZ) awaiting an overhaul with some of the apparatus on its roof removed

As a result of the continuation of the modernization of the trolley in the same 1998 there was a modification, the ZiU- 682G -016 (ZiU- 682G0M), which became the base model. Exterior siding boards became run from extruded galvanized steel sheets, which improved the appearance of the trolley and increased its corrosion resistance. Casement doors were subjected to additional treatment with a special rustproofing compound. A great deal of work was done to improve the electrical trolley: applied dielectric coating rods susceptor set travel stops rods, improved insulation chicanery, installed in the cab indicator of leakage currents, improved design -board covers and sealing side compartments, redesigned heater. Also applied to the trolley locking system running with the doors open.

Back in the mid-1990s, it became apparent that the location of electrical equipment underneath the trolley did not meet modern requirements of the current equipment, because it does not protect it from moisture, anti-icing agents or other debris and damaging conditions, and also allows the bus to drag the assembly through puddles should their depth exceed ten centimeters. In 1995, the model was designed as the ZiU- 52642, which is a major upgrade to the ZiU- 682G with the removal of electrical equipment on the roof of the trolley and other changes. However, for various reasons, the model series did not go.

The first production series with the removal of part of the apparatus on the roof became ZiU- 682G -017 (ZiU- 682G0H), launched in 2000. Unlike experienced ZiU- 52642 equipped with a Thyristor-pulse control system, modification ZiU- 682G -017 remained equipped with classical, uneconomical and unsupported acceptable smoothness Rheostat- contactor control system, electrical equipment factory "Dinamo" conventional platen doors. Some of the changes undergone interior, in particular, have been installed interior lights more modern form. From 2002 to request the trolley began to be produced in variants with altered appearance cabin (this applied fiberglass pad).

=== ZiU-682G-016.02 and ZiU-682G-016.03 ===
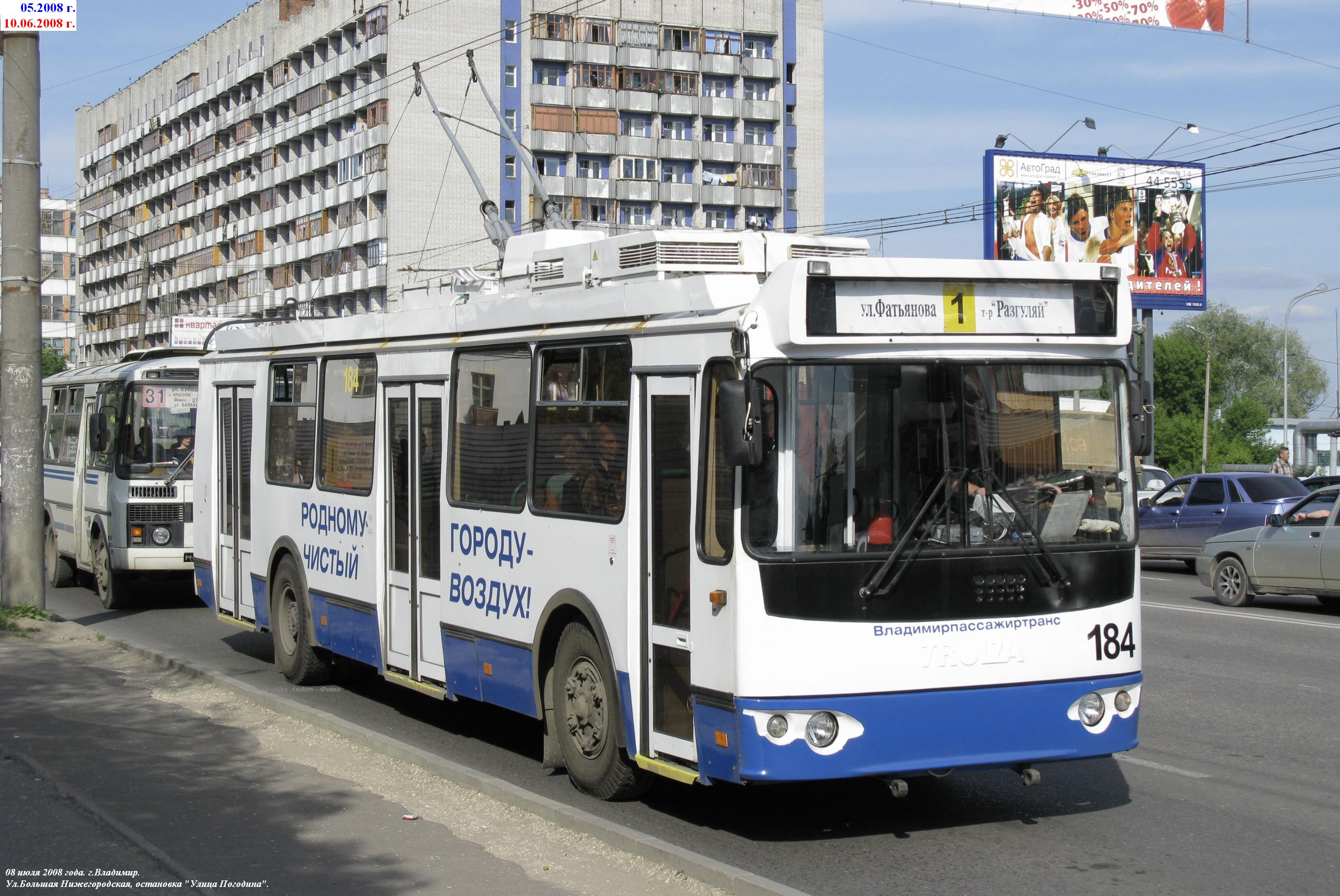
ZiU-682G-016.02 in Vladimir, Russia.

Since October 2002, commercially produced modification ZiU- 682G - 016.02, which is a further development of the model ZiU- 682G -018. Siding boards made of seamless steel sheet paneling front of the trolley were combined with the use of fiberglass panels; the front bumper was also made of fiberglass. Passenger cabin windows are tinted glass, and a new panoramic windshield was installed. Increased corrosion protection was added to the body, including the use of conductive soils firm «Sikkens» in lap welds, phosphate protective coating, as well as additional coverage of the base, sides, front and rear of the protective coating.

On trolley mounted traction motor DC - 213A production Moscow factory "Dinamo" 110 kW. Control system - rheostat- contactor. Most of traction electric trolley put to the roof. Collectors located on the roof, power resistors, group controller, radioreaktory circuit breaker WB -7 (there is an option to install instead of the WB -7 breaker manual AV- 8 in the cab at the rear), a static converter (IPT-600/28 or BP -3G), stroke limiter rods. Behind the driver is case inside of which has an electric panel protective relays. In this regard, the first window on the left side of the passenger compartment has reduced dimensions, there is no passenger seat facing the front wheel arch. Interior lighting passenger compartment carried fluorescent fixtures have modes full, partial, and emergency lighting. Passenger room is equipped with separate comfortable seats (which, however, often criticized for full passengers trouble and inconvenience). Two passenger seats are equipped to transport people with limited mobility. Parking brake acts on the brakes the drive wheels of energy storage, control of air in the cab of the crane. The hydraulic oil tank is equipped with a power steering oil level warning device.

To improve the electrical introduced fiberglass boards, electrical insulation flaps passenger doors from the body, external electrical insulation rod current collectors, insulation monitoring device UKI, emergency switch, the imposition of mostly electric traction kit from under the floor to the roof, technological track on the roof to move attendants, rear stopper rods pantographs fitted to three electrical insulators, locking the trolley system with open doors, emergency (spare) the passenger area lighting system ANTI passenger doors, emergency exits through the windows of the cabin, equipment service doors from inside and outside governments to open in an emergency installation on the roof of a high-speed circuit-breaker with remote control, etc.

The trolley ZiU- 682G - 016.03 has also been produced commercially since 2004. Its main difference from ZiU - 682G - 016.02 is that the frame (base) body is made of an open profile (sill), which increases the rigidity and makes it more resistant to corrosion. Trolleybus body ZiU- 682G 016.03 - welded frame construction.

Optionally, the vehicle may be installed with a swing-slide-type front double door (which is especially important for use in Moscow, as one must pay for travel validation).

Since September 2009, in connection with the termination of a license to manufacture trolleybuses, issue ZiU 682G016.02 - and - ZiU 682G016.03 were discontinued.

=== ZiU-682G-016.04 and ZiU-682G-016.05 ===
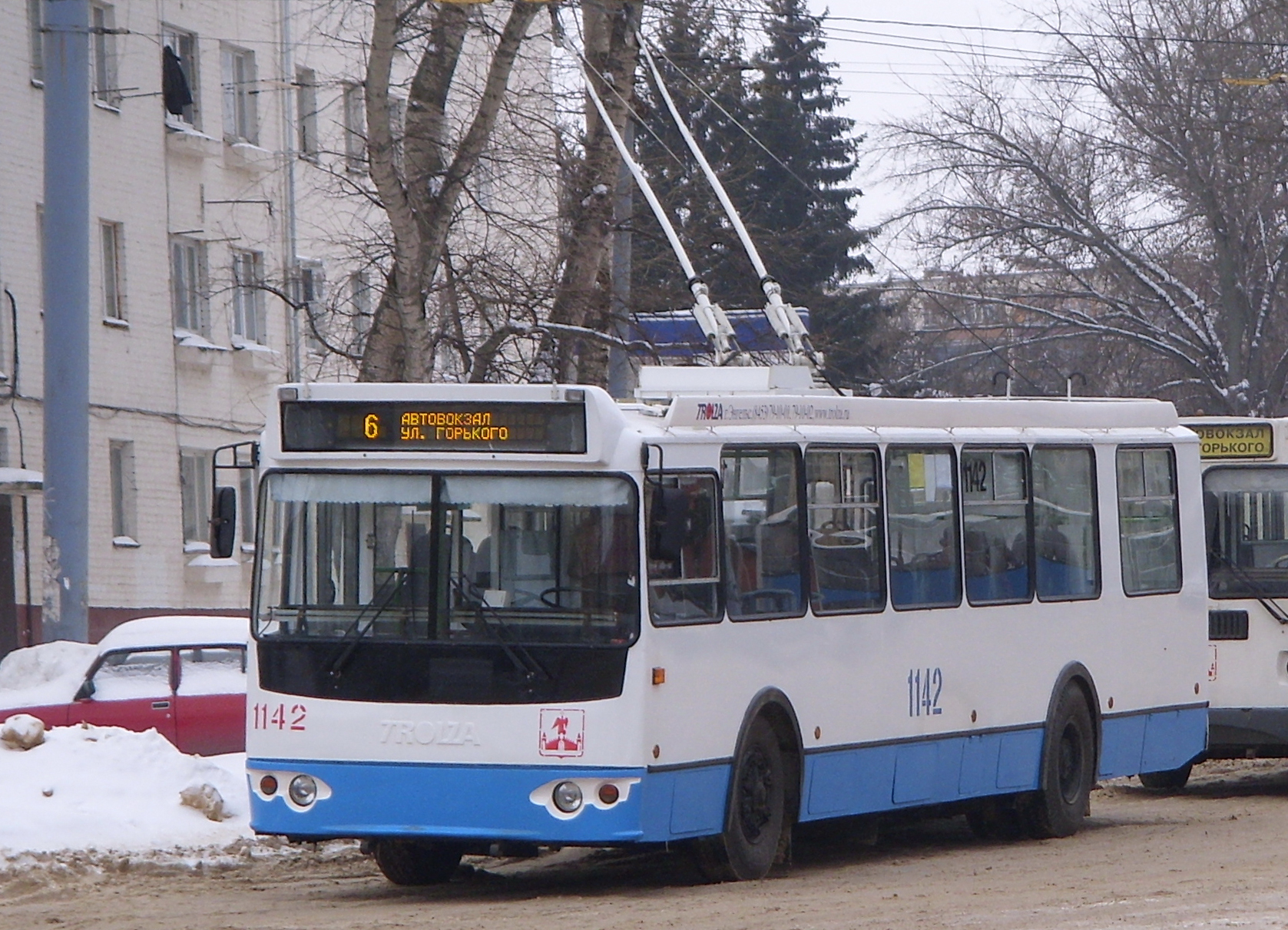
Trolleybus ZiU-682G-016.05 in Orël, Russia

Since September 2009, JSC "Trolza" in accordance with an obtained production license started production of trolleybuses ZiU-682G-016.04 and ZiU-682G-016.05. And apparently, these trolleys and constructive modifications almost completely replicate their predecessors ZiU-682G-016.02 and ZiU-682G-016.03. As changes in the rank of permanent options included installing electronic route signs and a marquee in the passenger compartment and ABS that ZiU-682G-ZiU 016.02 and 016.03-682G-performed by the customer.

=== Modifications as of 2012 ===
Note that in approximately 2003 JSC "Trolza" changed several notations for produced models of the ZiU- 682G family, considering them all modifications ZiU- 682G -016 (VIN- code starts with all modifications XTU682G0M). As of 2010, the manufacturer offers the following serial modifications (listed in order of increasing number of changes compared to ZiU- 682G)

- ZiU- 682G -016 (012) - a basic model similar ZiU- 682G -012 (delivery in the form of a body 1st version)
- ZiU- 682G -016 (018) - modification, similar ZiU- 682G -018, and has a slight performance improvement ZiU- 682G -016 (delivery in the form of a body 1st version)
- ZiU- 682G - 016.02 (delivery in the form of a body 1st version)
- ZiU- 682G - 016.03 (delivery in the form of a body 1st version)
- ZiU- 682G - 016.04
- ZiU- 682G - 016.05

In 2009, Trolza developed a modified ZiU- 682G - 016.07. This machine has a total 016.04 with a different numbering and control system - TrSU " Chergos " instead of the standard rheostat- contactor. The only instance in operation in Murmansk.

The serial production for the ZiU-9 was discontinued in 2014 due to a lack of demand for the model.

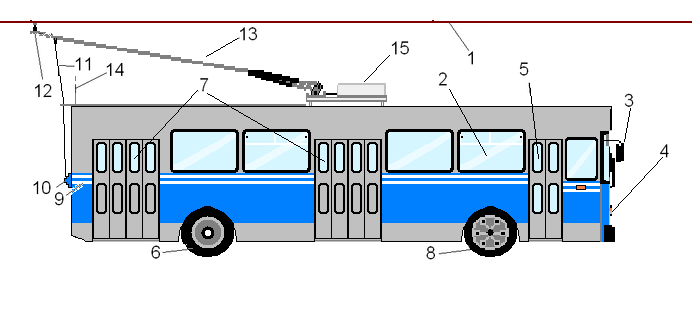

== Clones produced by other companies ==
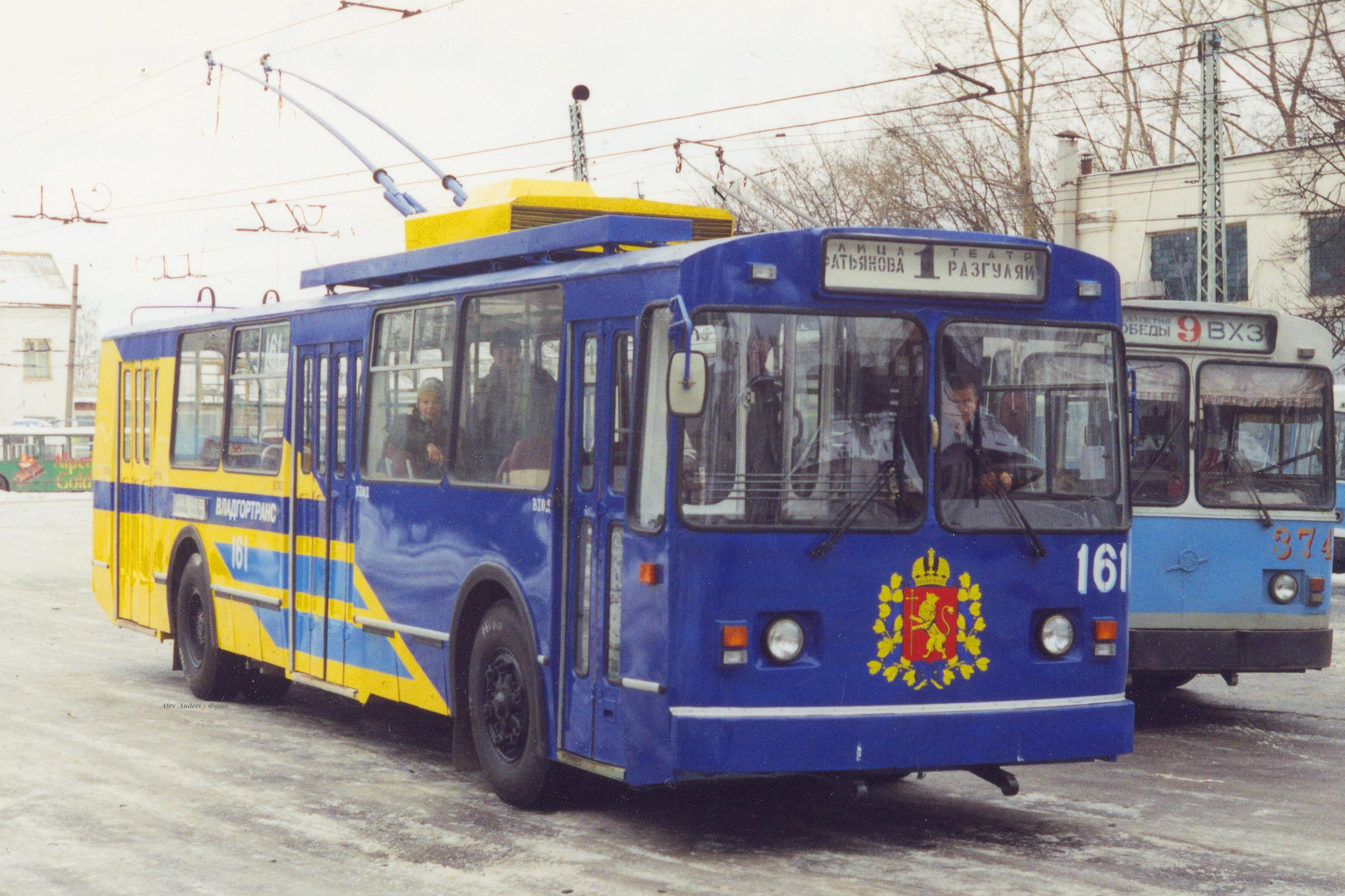
VMZ-170 trolleybus in Vladimir, Russia

Many factories in modern Russia or Belarus developed their unlicensed or semi-licensed copies of the ZiU-9 design and its variations. They may have different designations and trademarks, but in the colloquial language all of them are referred to as "ZiU-9 clones".

- AKSM 100, AKSM 101 and their various modifications built by Belkommunmash (Minsk)
- BTZ -5276 and modifications built by manufacturer Bashkir Trolleybus Plant (Ufa)
- VZTM -5284 and modifications built by manufacturer Volgograd Plant of Transport Engineering (Volgograd)
- VMZ -170 built by manufacturer Vologda Mechanical Plant (JSC " Trans- Alpha", Vologda)
- Trolleybuses production "Nizhtroll" (Nizhny Novgorod), officially passing as overhaul reconditioning
- CT- 682G production "Siberian trolley" (Novosibirsk), officially passing as overhaul reconditioning
- MTRZ - 6223 Moscow trolleybus production plant - modernization of the ZiU -682 for Moscow
- ZiU -682 ZiU BTRM production "Barnaul trolleybus repair shops " (Barnaul), officially passing as overhaul reconditioning
- MTRZ - 6223 Altayelektrotrans production " CAU " Altayelektrotrans " " (Barnaul)
- ZiU -682 Barnaul production of " Company " Altai electric transport company " " (Barnaul)

== Operators ==
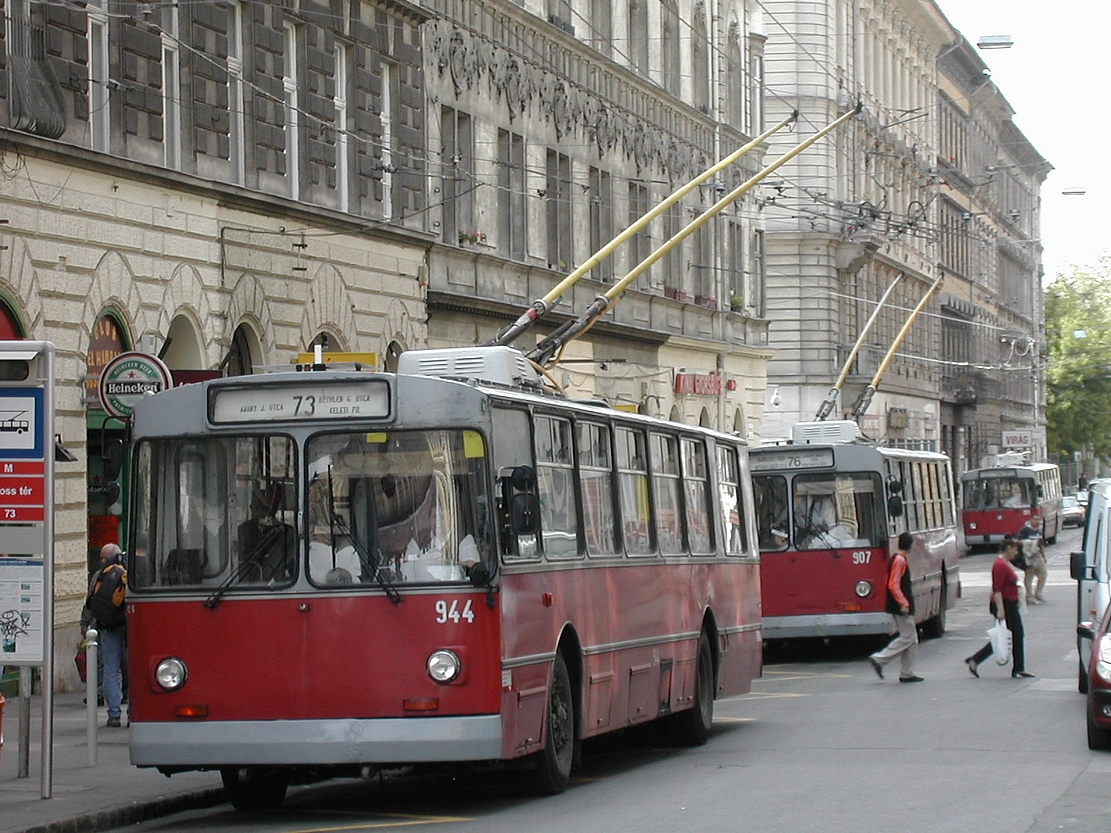
Ziu-9 trolleybuses in Budapest, Hungary (retired 2013)

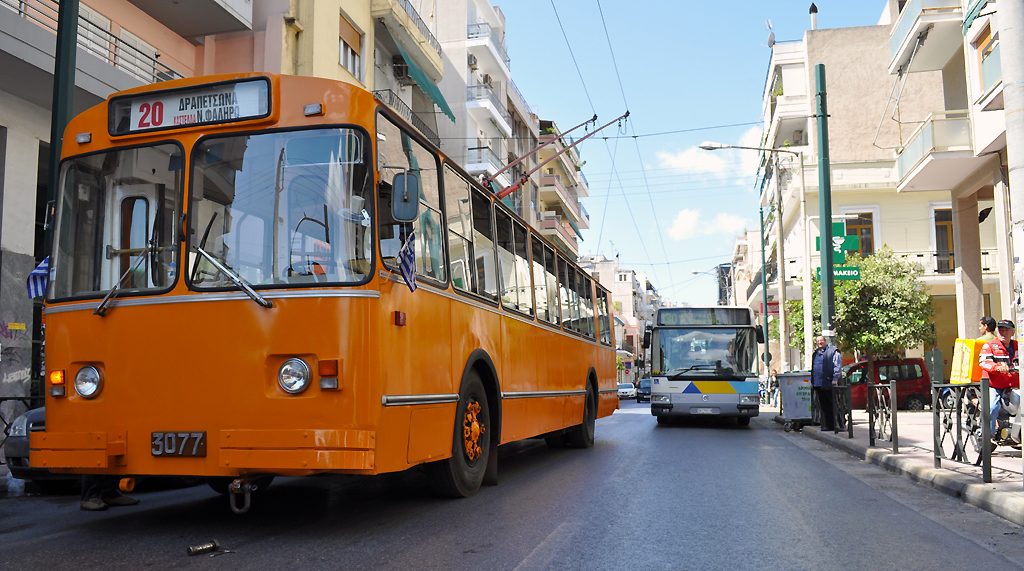
A Greek ZiU-9 operating an excursion route in Piraeus

In Hungary, ZiU-9 trolleys still operate in recent years, but they have been retired in Debrecen (DKV), Budapest (BKV), and Szeged (SzKT). Originally 174 of them were used in the capital city of Budapest, and a few dozen more in other cities. Regardless, some buses are still in working condition and are used occasionally by retro and heritage trolley services.

ZiU-9s formerly or are currently employed in all ex-USSR countries except the Baltic states. They have also been in service in Belgrade ever since the Yugoslav period.

They were also sold to Greece, Argentina, and Colombia. In the latter, the EDTU (Empresa Distrital de Transportes Urbanos) was a larger operator of these buses; they were in a very bad conservation state in the former Eastern Bloc countries. Three buses were on loan in 1973 for testing purposes in Helsinki, Finland.

Between 1992 and 1994, the Moldovan village of Soloncheny operated a single ZiU-9, which was leased from the operator in Kishinev for 50 000 rubles. The vehicle, No. 2049, was returned to the fleet in Kishinev in 1994 and continued to operate until c. 2006.

== Greek donation ==
In 2004, the ILPAP, the operator of the trolleybuses in Athens and Piraeus, Greece donated nearly all of its old ZiU-9 trolleybuses to the city of Belgrade and to Georgia (country). One was donated to the East Anglia Transport Museum.

Belgrade has had ZiU-9 trolleybuses since the late 1970s. In 2010, a public action was made to save Belgrade's first ZiU-9 from being scrapped.

== See also ==
- ZiU-10
- ZiU-9 EMU
