= Trolza =

Russian trolleybus manufacturer

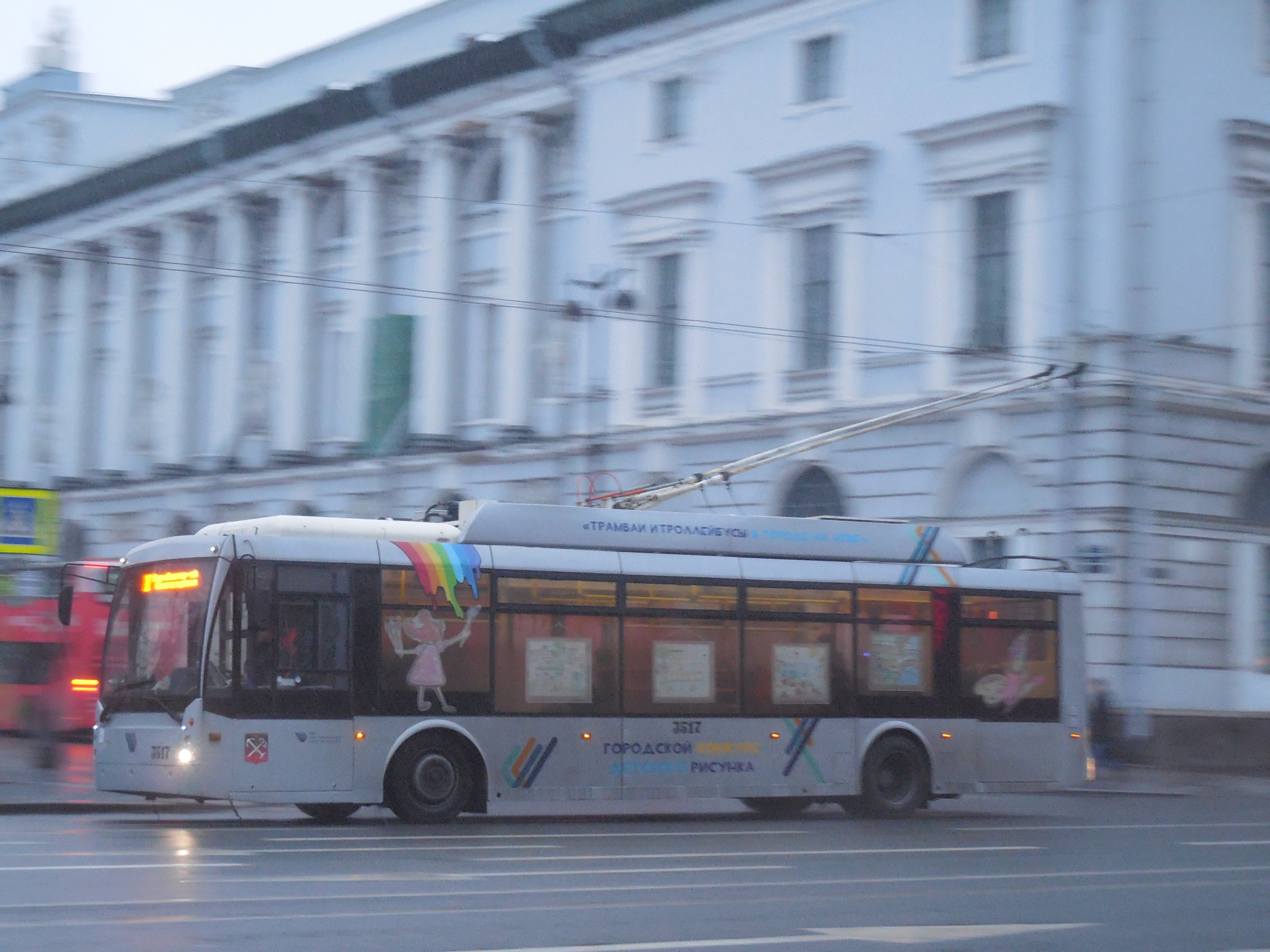
- Trolza-5265 in Saint-Petersburg
- Native name: ЗАО «ТролЗа»
- Company type: Closed joint-stock company
- Industry: Trolleybus manufacturing
- Founded: 1868
- Defunct: 2020
- Headquarters: Engels, Saratov Oblast, Russia
- Products: Trolleybuses and buses
- Number of employees: 1,798 (2011)
- Website: www.trolza.ru

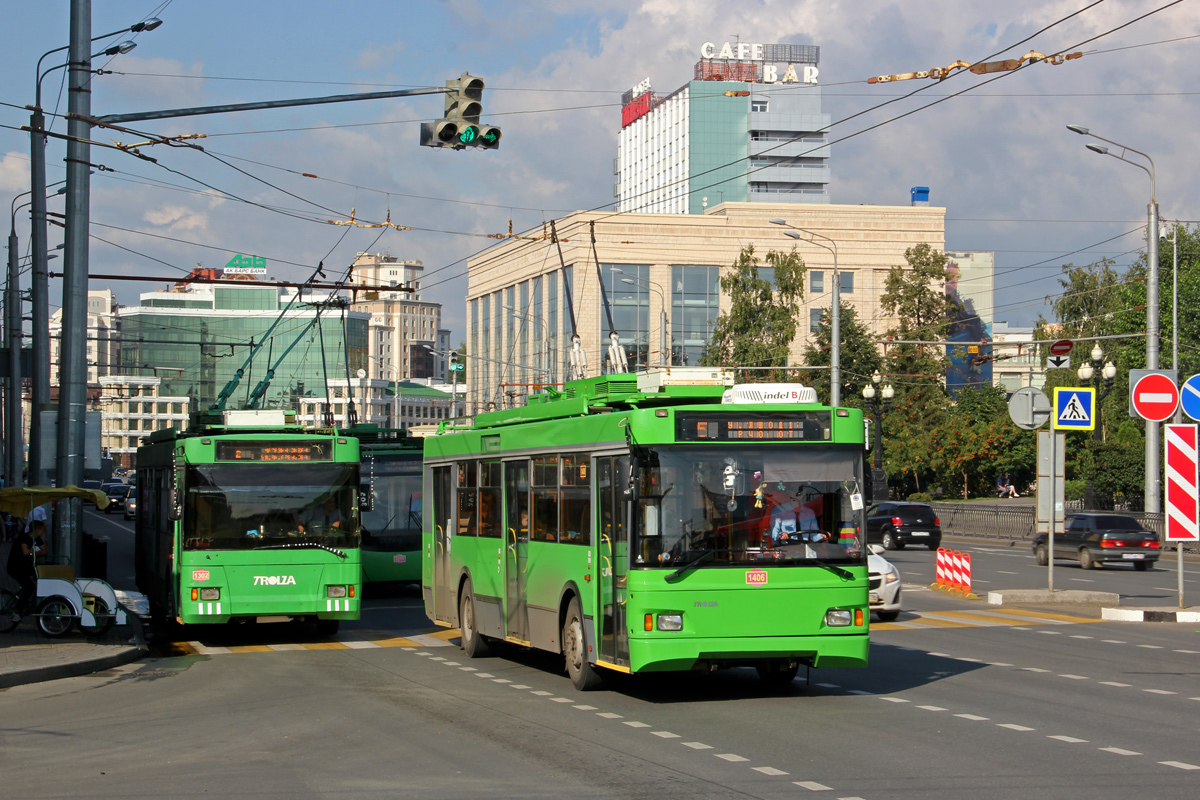
Trolza-5275 in Kazan

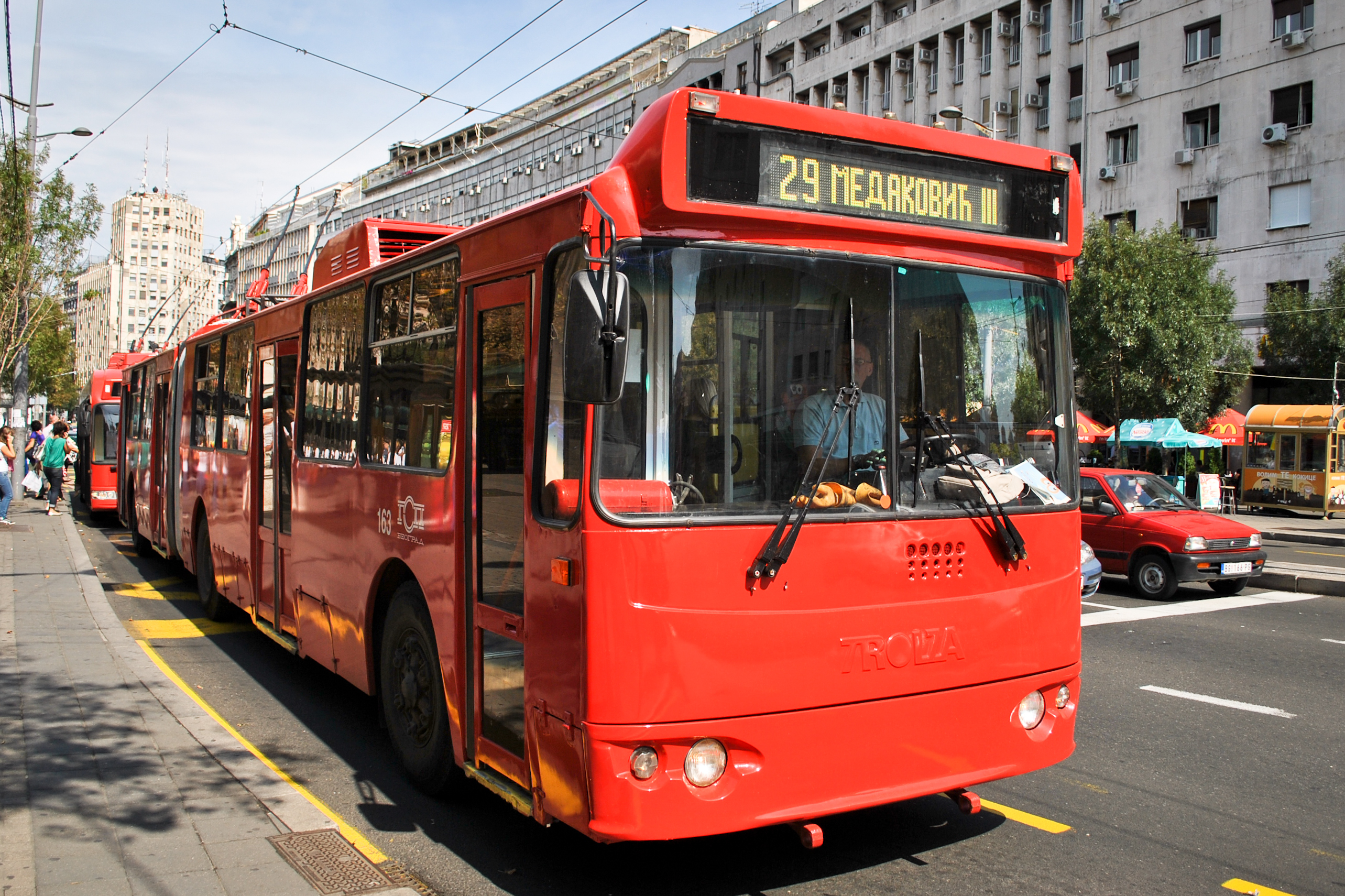
Trolza-62052.01 [62052Б] in Belgrade, Serbia

Trolza (Russian: ZАО "Троллейбусный завод", abbr. Тролза), formerly known as the Uritsky factory or simply Uritsky, was a trolleybus manufacturer in Russia, located in Engels, Saratov oblast.

In the Soviet era it was known as ZiU (Russian: Завод имени Урицкого, Zavod imeni Uritskogo, plant named after revolutionary Moisei Uritskiy) or Uritsky factory (plant).

ZiU/Trolza has built over 65,000 trolleybuses. Historically, the most numerous models of ZiU production were the MTB-82, the ZiU-5 and the ZiU-9 (also known as the ZiU-682). The ZiU-9 is the most widely produced trolleybus in history. The factory has exported its production to various countries, including Argentina, Bulgaria, Colombia, Greece, Mongolia, Hungary, Serbia etc.

== History ==
The enterprise was founded in Imperial Russia in 1868, but it began producing trolleybuses in 1951.

Trolleybus production by the Uritsky factory (ZiU) began in 1951, but the company's first model, the MTB-82d, was a refinement of a design first developed several years earlier, by the national government in Moscow in 1945–46, the MTB-82m (where MTB stood for Moscow Trolleybus). A prototype MTB-82m was built in February 1946 at a military factory. Following the construction of 77 additional MTB-82 trolleybuses in 1946–47, improvements in the design led to the introduction of the MTB-82d. Production of the improved model continued at military factories as well as at MTRZ, a small trolleybus repair plant in Moscow, until 1951, when the Uritsky factory was established in Engels to take over all trolleybus production from the various smaller facilities. ZiU's production of the MTB-82d lasted from 1951 to 1961, and a total of 3,746 were built (or more than 5,000 when counting the ones built elsewhere, before ZiU was established).

In the 1980s, ZiU was building more than 2,000 trolleybuses per year, mostly for domestic use (in the then Soviet Union) but up to 160 per year for export outside the USSR. For many years until at least the early 1990s, ZiU was the world's largest manufacturer of trolleybuses. Around 1996, it was renamed Trolza, short for AO Trolleybusnyi Zavod (Trolleybus Factory).

In 2016, Trolza announced that it would begin production of trolleybuses and electric buses in Juárez Celman, Córdoba Province, Argentina. The company intends to supply and modernise existing systems in Rosario, Córdoba and Mendoza while also supplying new potential networks.

On February 20, 2020, it was announced that the production of trolleybuses and electric buses at Trolza would be discontinued due to financial difficulties. The former facilities in Engels were rented out to PC Transport Systems.
