= Lysogorsky District =

Lysogorsky District Лысогорский район (Russian)
- District
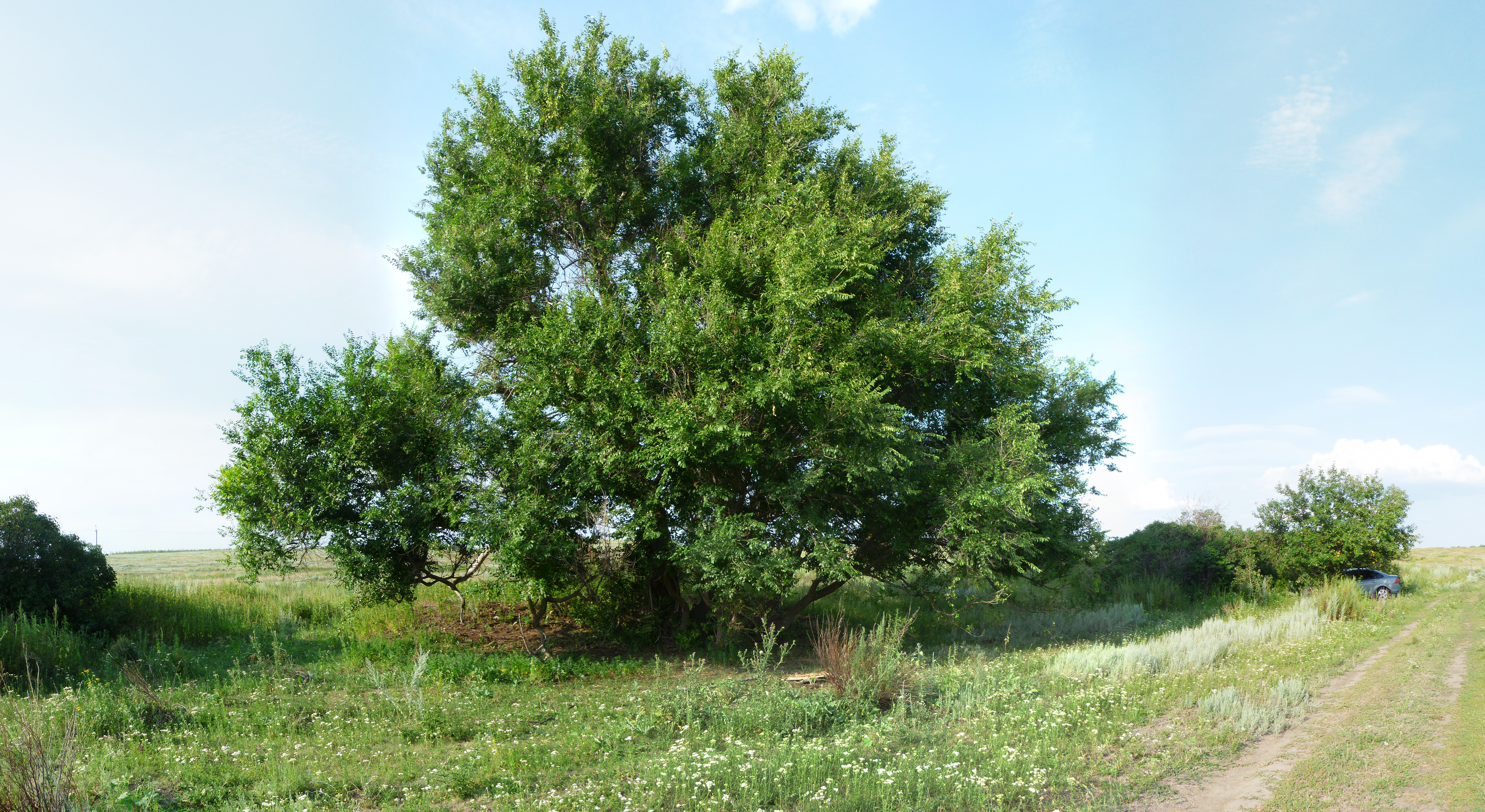
- Landscape in Lysogorsky District

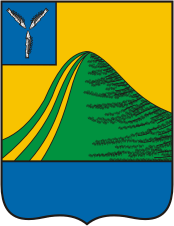
- Coat of arms
- Location of Lysogorsky District in Saratov Oblast
- Coordinates: 51°31′45″N 44°48′20″E
- Country: Russia
- Federal subject: Saratov Oblast
- Established: 23 July 1928
- Administrative center: Lysye Gory

Area
  - Total: 2,300 km^{2} (890 sq mi)

Population (2010 Census)
  - Total: 19,948
  - Density: 8.7/km^{2} (22/sq mi)
  - Urban: 36.0%
  - Rural: 64.0%

Administrative structure
  - Inhabited localities: 1 urban-type settlements, 43 rural localities

Municipal structure
  - Municipally incorporated as: Lysogorsky Municipal District
  - Municipal divisions: 1 urban settlements, 9 rural settlements
- Time zone: UTC+4 (MSK+1)
- OKTMO ID: 63625000
- Website: http://adm.lysyegory.ru/

Lysogorsky District (Russian: Лысогорский райо́н) is an administrative and municipal district (raion), one of the thirty-eight in Saratov Oblast, Russia. It is located in the southwest of the oblast. The area of the district is 2,300 square kilometers (890 sq mi). Its administrative center is the urban locality (a work settlement) of Lysye Gory. Population: 19,948 (2010 Census); 21,260 (2002 census); 20,797 (1989 Soviet census). The population of Lysye Gory accounts for 36.0% of the district's total population.
