= Multiple-unit train control =

Way of controlling trains

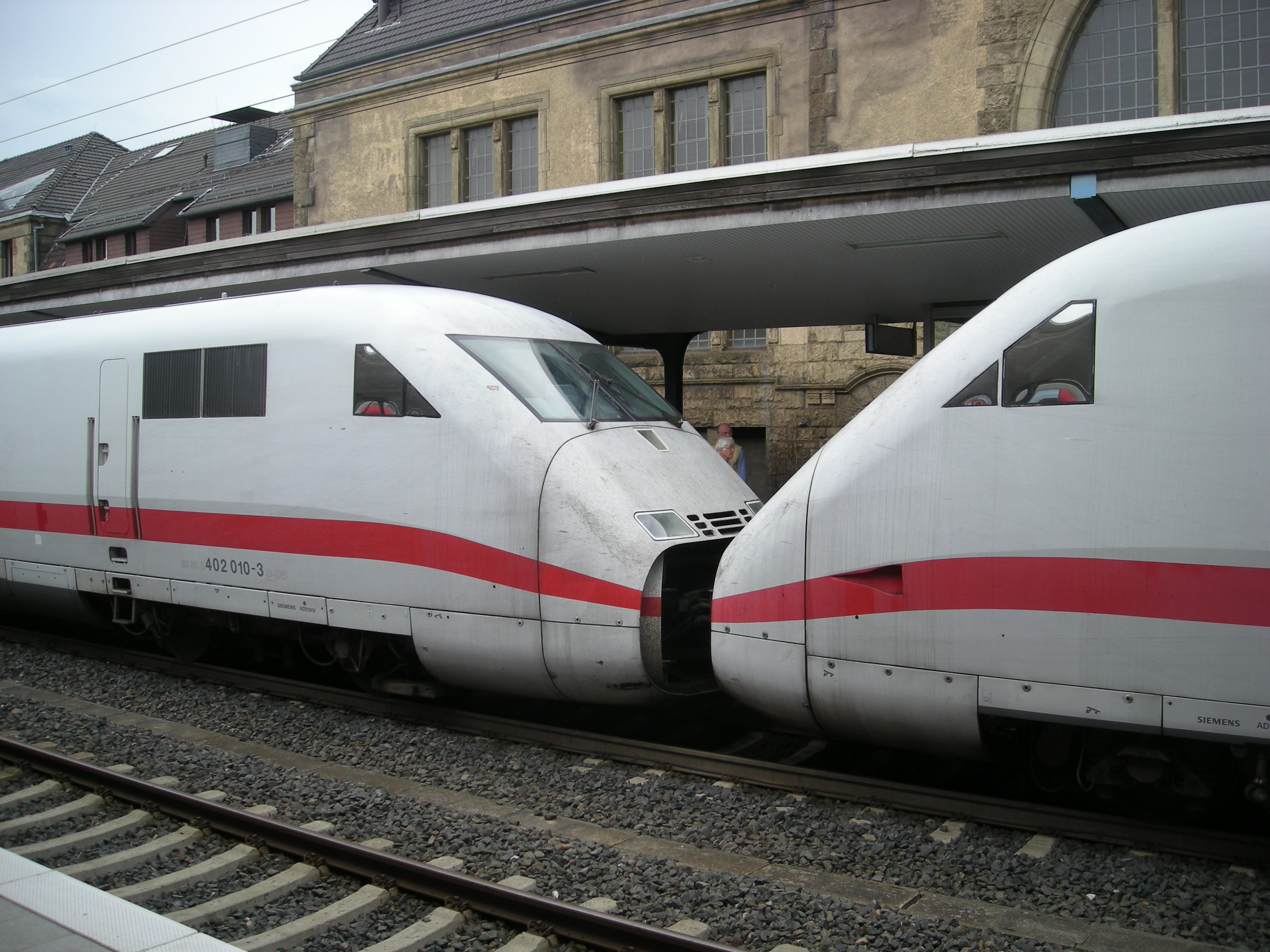
Two ICE 2 trains operating in multiple-unit train control in Bielefeld, Germany

Multiple-unit train control, sometimes abbreviated to multiple-unit or MU, is a method of simultaneously controlling all the traction equipment in a train from a single location—whether it is a multiple unit comprising a number of self-powered passenger cars or a set of locomotives—with only a control signal transmitted to each unit. This contrasts with arrangements where electric motors in different units are connected directly to the power supply switched by a single control mechanism, thus requiring the full traction power to be transmitted through the train.

A set of vehicles under multiple unit control is referred to as a consist in the United States.

== Origins ==
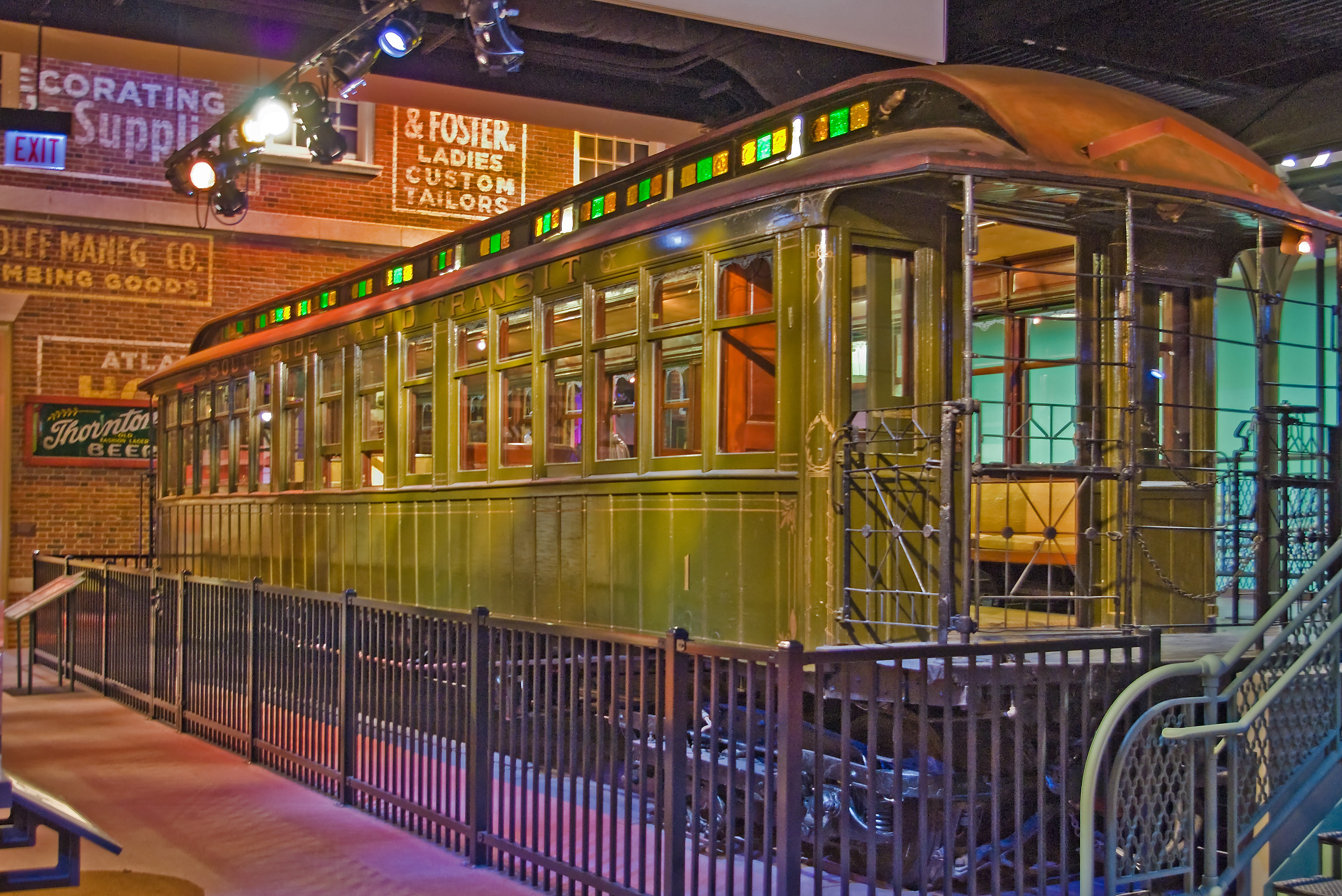
South Side Elevated Railroad car #1, one of the cars that Frank Sprague converted to MU operation in Chicago

Multiple unit train control was first used in electric multiple units in the 1890s.

=== The Liverpool Overhead Railway ===
The Liverpool Overhead Railway opened in 1893 with two-car electric multiple units, controllers in cabs at both ends directly controlling the traction current to motors on both cars.

=== Frank J. Sprague ===
The multiple unit traction control system was developed by Frank Sprague and first applied and tested on the South Side Elevated Railroad (now part of the Chicago 'L') in 1897. In 1895, derived from his company's invention and production of direct current elevator control systems, Frank Sprague invented a multiple unit controller for electric train operation. This accelerated the construction of electric traction railways and trolley systems worldwide. Each car of the train has its own traction motors: by means of motor control relays in each car energized by train-line wires from the front car all of the traction motors in the train are controlled in unison.

== Locomotive applications ==
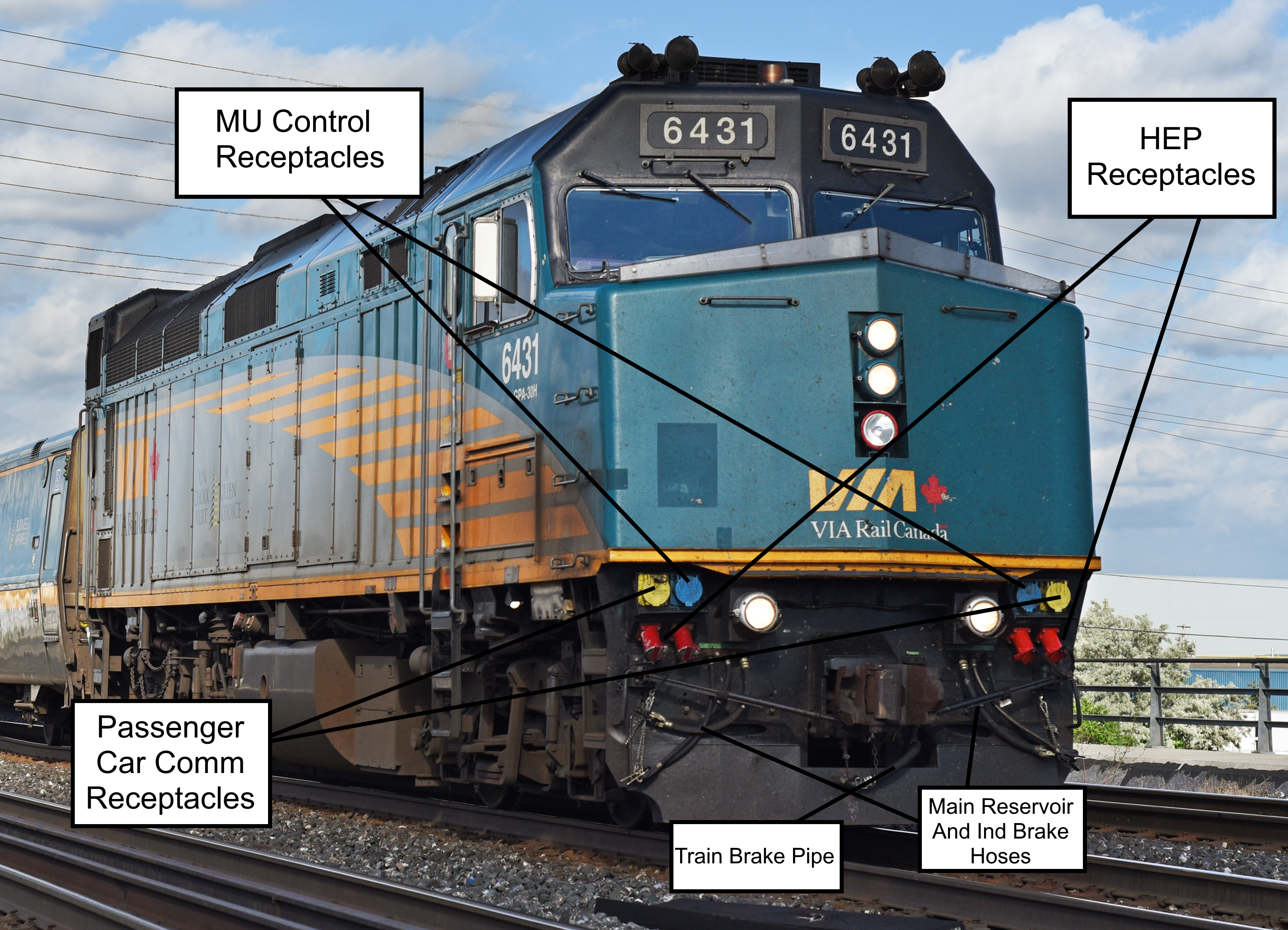
Via Rail EMD F40PH locomotive with image edited to illustrate the location and functions of the various receptacles and hoses featured on many AAR Standard North American locomotives. The communication jumpers (outermost yellow) are exclusive to passenger locomotives and are omitted from freight locomotives.

Sprague's MU system was adopted for use by diesel–electric locomotives and electric locomotives in the 1920s; however, these early control connections were entirely pneumatic. Today's modern MU control utilizes both pneumatic elements for brake control and electric elements for throttle setting, dynamic braking, and fault lights.

In the early days of diesel electric MUing there were numerous systems; some were compatible with one another, but others were not. For example, when first delivered, many F units lacked MU cables on their noses, allowing only for MUing through the rear of the locomotive. That meant that if a train needed four locomotives and there were four A units and no B units, a train would require two train crews as the four A units could not be multiple-unit-controlled, except as two groups of two.

Terms used in North America are A unit and B unit where the B or "booster" unit does not have a control cab; slug where the B unit has traction motors powered by the "mother" unit via extra connections; and cow–calf for switcher locomotive units. A control car remote control locomotive has remote control but not traction equipment.

Most modern diesel locomotives are now delivered equipped for MU operation, allowing a consist (set) of locomotives to be operated from one cab. Not all MU connections are standardized between manufacturers, thus limiting the types of locomotives that can be used together. However, in North America there is a high level of standardization between all railroads and manufacturers using the Association of American Railroads (AAR) system which allows any modern locomotive in North America to be connected to any other modern North American locomotive. In the United Kingdom several incompatible MU systems are in use (and some locomotive classes were never fitted for MU working), but more modern diesel locomotives used on British railways use the standard Association of American Railroads system.

Modern locomotive MU systems can be easily spotted due to the large MU cables to the right and left of the coupler. The connections typically consist of several air hoses for controlling the air brake system, and an electrical cable for the control of the traction equipment. The largest hose, located next to the coupler, is the main air brake line or "train line". Additional hoses link the air compressors on the locomotives and control the brakes on the locomotives independently of the rest of the train. There are sometimes additional hoses that control the application of sand to the rails.

With distributed power, long trains, e.g. ore trains on mining lines, may have locomotives at each end and at intermediate locations in the train to reduce the maximum drawbar load. The locomotives are often radio-controlled from the lead locomotive by the Locotrol system. Remote control locomotives, e.g. "switchers" in hump yards, may be controlled by a stationary operator. These types of remote control systems often use the AAR MU standard which allows any locomotive using the AAR MU standard to be easily "MU'ed" to a control receiver and thus capable of becoming remote-controlled.

== Passenger train applications ==
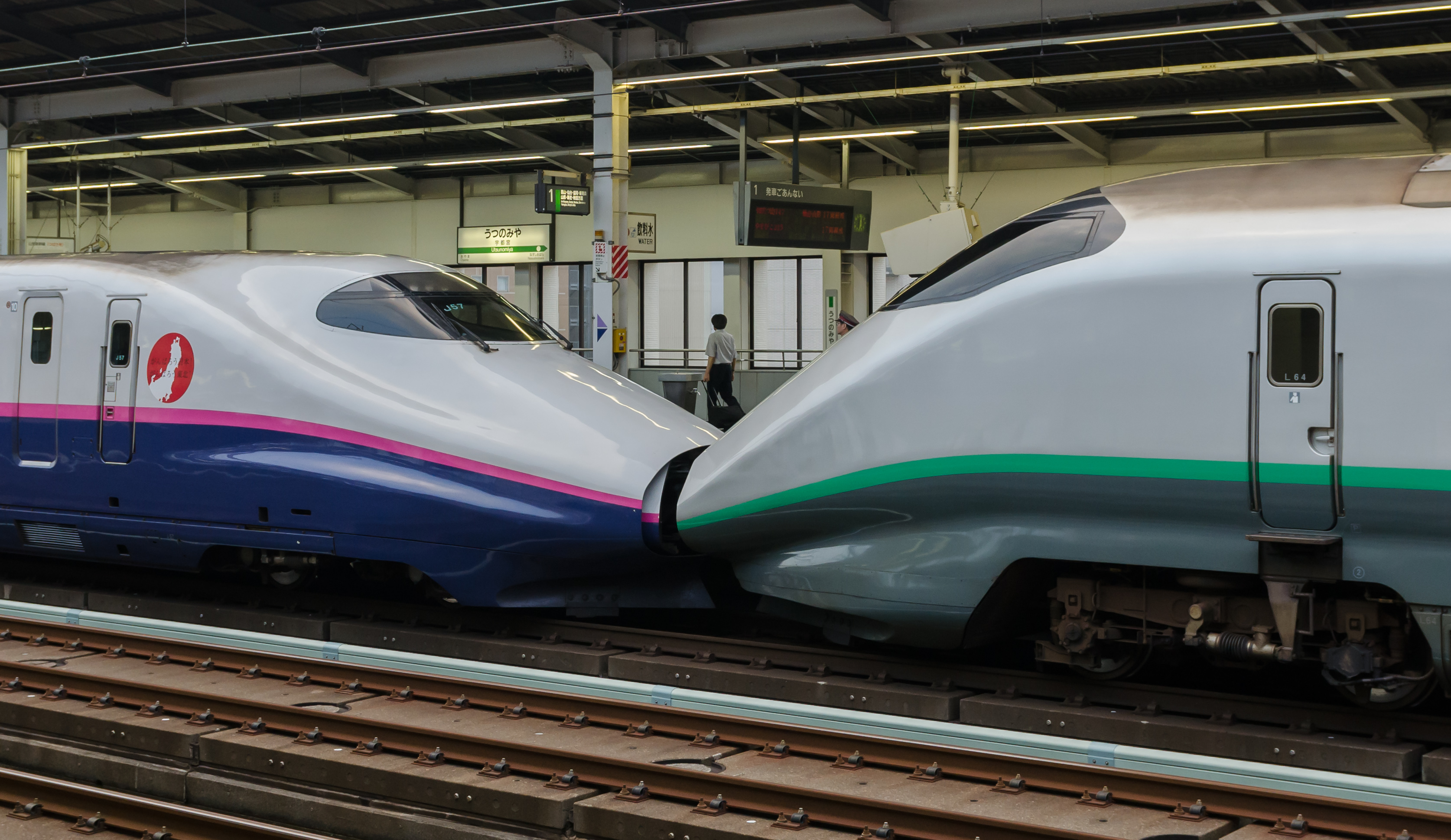
Two Japanese Shinkansen trains operating in multiple-unit train control

Modern electric multiple unit and diesel multiple unit vehicles often utilise a specialised coupler that provides mechanical, electrical and pneumatic connections between vehicles. These couplers permit trains to be connected and disconnected automatically without the need for human intervention on the ground.

There are a few designs of fully automatic couplers in use worldwide, including the Scharfenberg coupler, various knuckle hybrids (such as the Tightlock, used in the UK), the Wedglock coupling, Dellner couplings (similar to Scharfenberg couplers in appearance), and the BSI coupling.

Multiple control technology is also used in push-pull trains operating with a standard locomotive at one end only. Control signals are either received from the cab as normal, or from a cab car at the other end that is connected to the locomotive by cables through the intermediate cars.

In the United States, Amtrak often operates one to three diesel locomotives on routes outside the Northeast corridor with only one operator.

== In trolleybuses ==
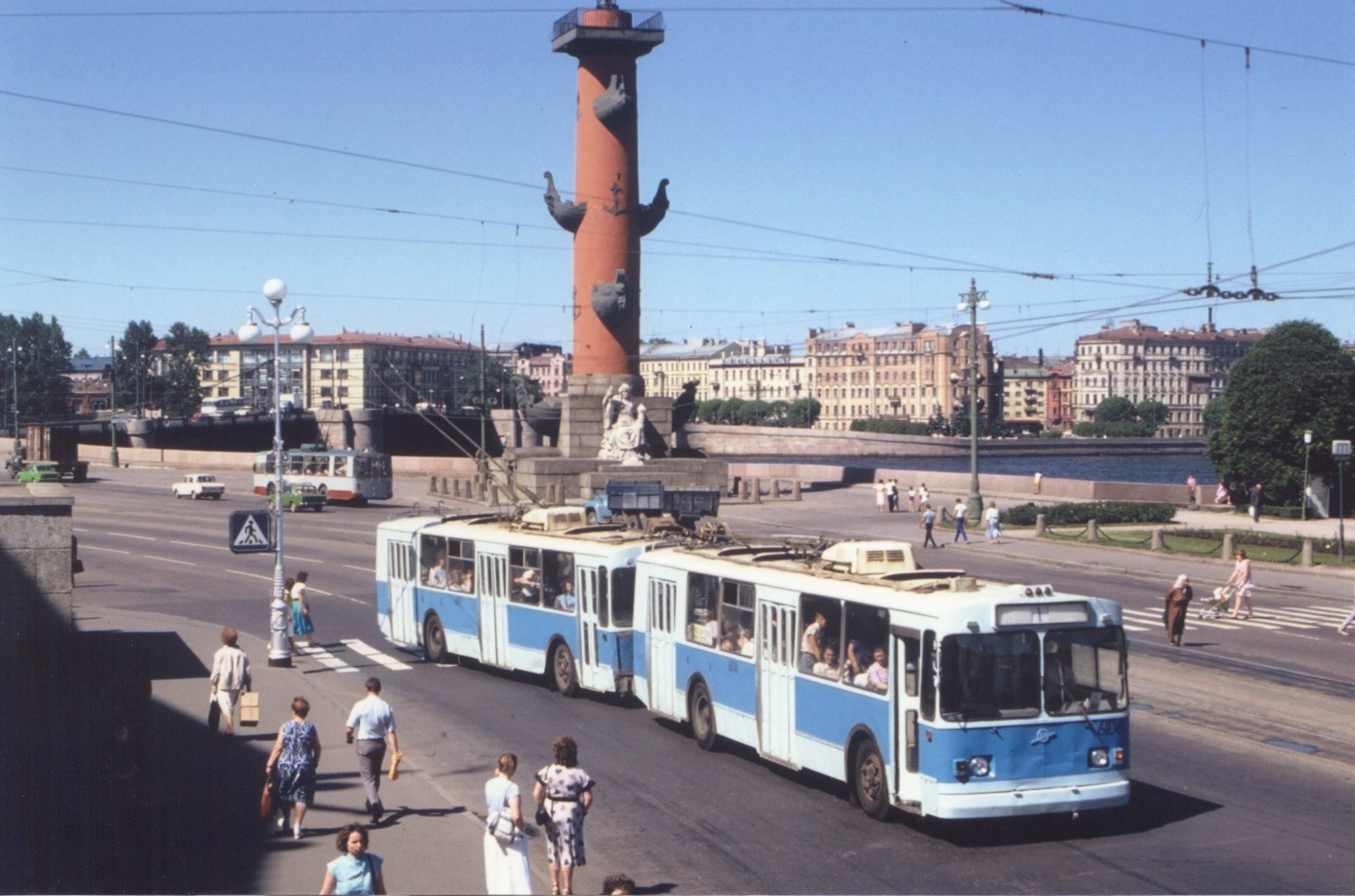
Two ZiU-9 trolleybuses operating in multiple-unit control in Saint Petersburg, USSR

In the USSR, increased capacity in public transport was necessary, but the local industry had not developed sufficiently to match world trends, such as by the production of articulated trolleybuses, the first of which was the SVARZ-TS, built in 1959 to 1967. It was not until 1963 that the next articulated trolleybus was produced, the ZiU-683. Hence, during this period, to satisfy passenger demand, research started to produce trolleybuses connected in multiple working, which had first successfully run in Kyiv on June 12, 1966. This system was designed by Ukrainian engineer Volodymyr Veklych, and connected two MTB-82D trolleybuses. Although other cities had tried to engineer similar systems, their solutions often resulted in rapid wear of traction motors, due to the vehicles never being intended for such use.

So the invention by Veklych was borrowed by many trolleybus companies, in particular, Donetsk, Kherson, Mykolaiv, Minsk, Tallinn, Riga, St. Petersburg, Novosibirsk and many other cities.

The design of the rotating joint was similar to that of a tram with rods and hinges; both trolleybuses would have their motors and brakes controlled by the driver in the front. They also allowed for coupling and decoupling in 3–5 minutes, which was intended such that at the end of peak hours, the trolleybuses could be split again into two. However, due to the abundance of trolleybuses and electricity, there was rarely a need to do so.

With the retirement of the MTB-82 trolleybuses, the system was also adapted to the Skoda 9Tr and the ZiU-5. Due to the lack of need for it, the rapid decoupling system was excluded. From 1973, trolleybuses in Riga also used the coupling of Skoda 9Tr trolleybuses. They would be the longest working coupled Skoda trolleybuses, used until 2001. In 1976, a three trolleybus coupling was tested in Kyiv, but due to sufficient transport, it did not receive further development. With the transition to the next generation of trolleybuses, the ZiU-682, these couplings were once again necessary for higher capacity transport, since the articulated version met constant delays. Although 810 trains were created in various Soviet republics, not a single one has survived in original state.

Throughout its use, the implementation of trolleybus trains have been used in Saint Petersburg, Odesa, Donetsk, Samara, Novosibirsk, Omsk, Dnipro, Kharkiv, Moscow, Kemerovo, Sumy, Chelyabinsk, Nikolaev and Krasnodar.

== See also ==
- Diesel locomotive
- Multiple working (UK) (the system as used in UK)
- Push–pull (mode of operation for locomotive-hauled trains)
- Railway air brake
- Railway brakes
