= MTB-82 =

Soviet trolleybus

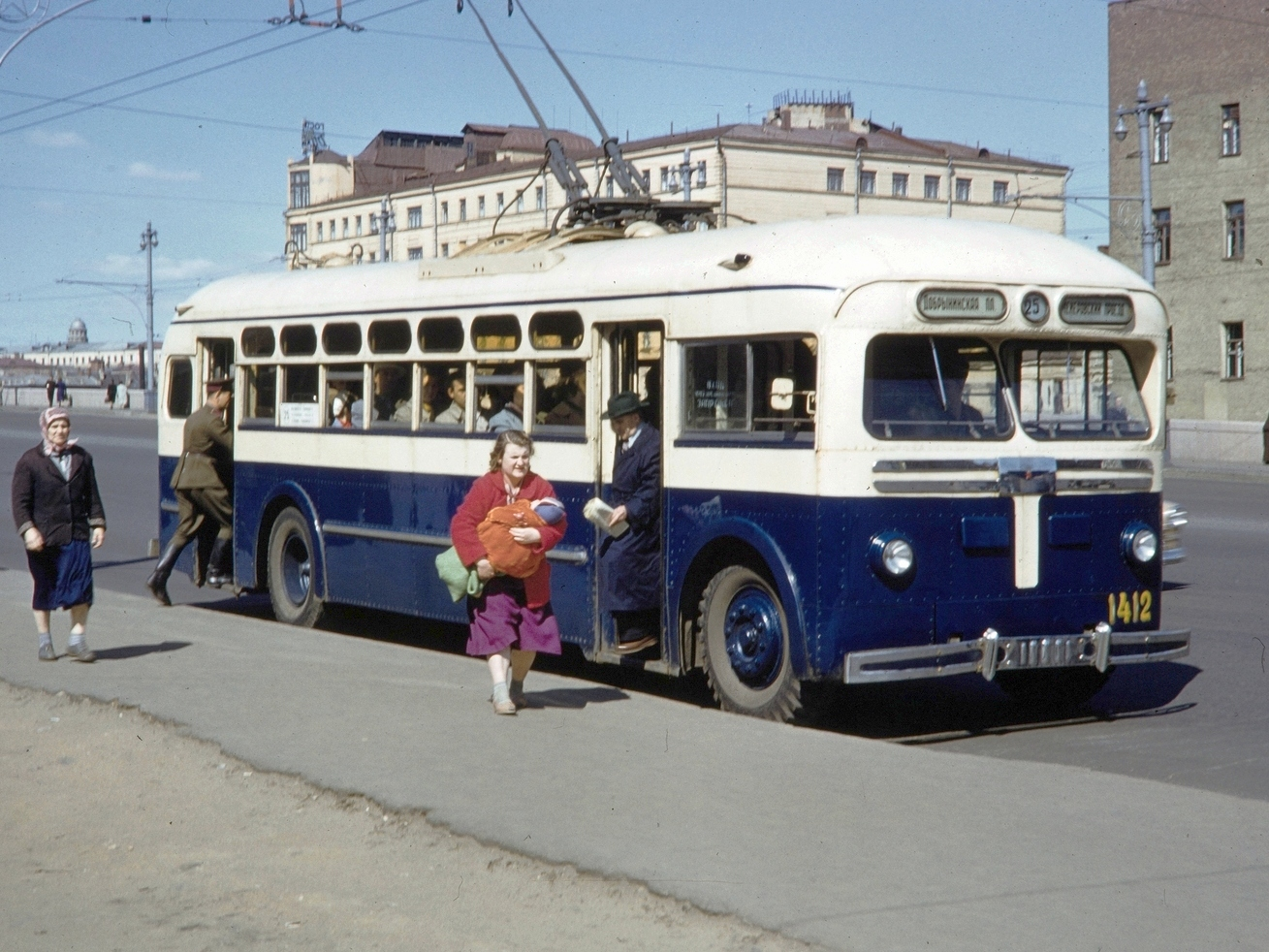
- MTB-82 in Moscow, 1959

Overview
- Type: Trolleybus
- Manufacturer: Plant No. 82 (1945–1951); Zavod imeni Uritskogo (1951–1961)
- Production: 1945–1960

Body and chassis
- Class: Trolleybus
- Body style: Single-decker
- Doors: 2
- Floor type: High-floor

Powertrain
- Electric motor: 600V DC, model DK-201 / DK-202B
- Power output: 74, 80, or 86 kW

Dimensions
- Wheelbase: 6,000 mm (236.2 in)
- Length: 10,365 mm (408.1 in)
- Width: 2,615 mm (103.0 in)
- Height: 3,670 mm (144.5 in)
- Kerb weight: 9.25 tonnes (9.10 long tons; 10.20 short tons)

Chronology
- Predecessor: YaTB-4
- Successor: ZiU-5

The MTB-82 (Russian: МТБ-82) is the designation of a type of Soviet trolleybus. The rigid buses were initially developed and manufactured by the Zavod No. 82 (Завод №82, Plant No. 82) armaments plant in the Moscow suburb of Tushino. In 1951, series production was transferred to the civilian company Zavod imeni Uritskogo (abbreviated to ZiU), which was located in the Saratov Oblast, RSFSR. This company currently operates under the name Trolza.

The series designation is composed of the abbreviation for Moscow Trolley Bus and the number of the developer company. The employees of the transport company have colloquially designated these trolleys "Emtebeshka," a diminutive of the abbreviation in Russian.

The Zavod No. 82 designed the model in 1945 to meet the needs of Soviet transport companies for trolleybuses. In terms of contemporary vehicle construction, the MTB-82 featured conservative or partially outdated technical solutions. These included the heavy load-bearing floor frame with removable body and the non-automatic contactor control. The series was considered uncomfortable for drivers and passengers. Conversely, the vehicles were constructed in a simple, robust, and durable manner and were reliable if the requisite maintenance was carried out correctly. These characteristics, in conjunction with the vehicle's widespread use and long service life, contributed to the design's economic success. Following the resumption of armaments production at Plant No. 82 in 1951, the ZiU continued to manufacture the MTB-82. In 1960, this manufacturer was able to complete work on the successor model, the ZiU-5. Subsequently, production of the MTB-82 was terminated in the same year.

In total, both manufacturers constructed approximately 5,000 MTB-82s, with 3,746 units designated as ZiUs. These vehicles were deployed in numerous Soviet cities and exported to select Central and Eastern European countries. Approximately ten years after the conclusion of series production of the MTB-82, the number of operational trolleybuses of this type began to decline rapidly. The delivery of numerous ZiU-5s, and later ZiU-9s and Škoda 9Trs, rendered the maintenance of the obsolete vehicles superfluous, resulting in the MTB-82s being phased out of service by 1975. A few examples were preserved as museum vehicles or technical monuments.

== History ==
=== Previous history ===
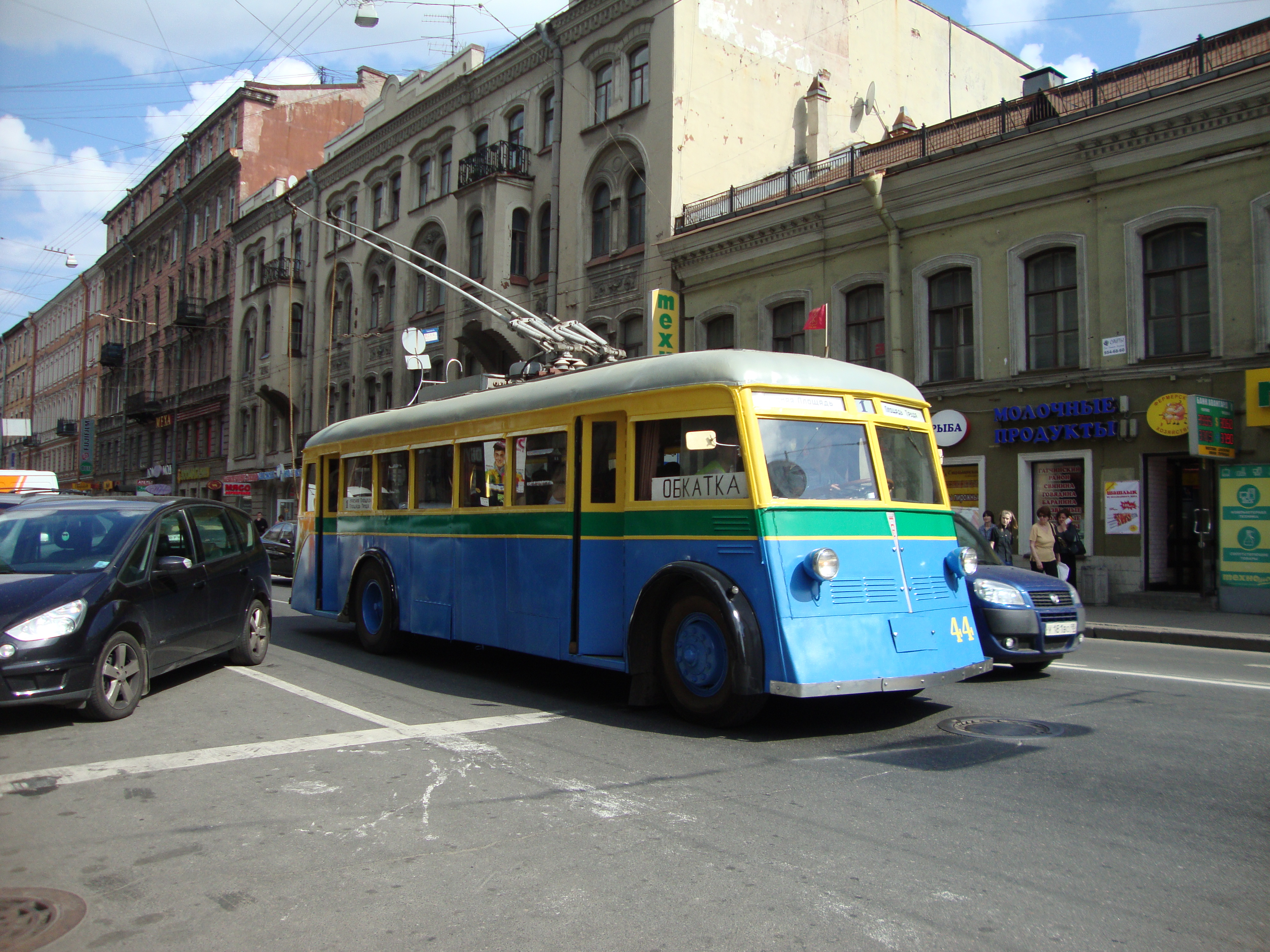
The YaTB-1 trolleybus

The Soviet Union's inaugural trolleybus network commenced operations in Moscow in 1933. This novel mode of public transportation rapidly garnered recognition from both the state leadership and passengers. Even before the outbreak of the Great Patriotic War in June 1941, trolleybuses were introduced in Leningrad, Rostov-on-Don, Kyiv, Tbilisi, Kharkiv, and Stalino. Even the onset of the war did not impede this development. During the war years, new trolleybus operations were established in the cities of Baku, Kuybyshev, Chelyabinsk, Sverdlovsk, Kirov, Alma-Ata, and Odesa. The vehicles of the YaTB series manufactured in Yaroslavl constituted the foundation of the Soviet trolleybus fleet. Their official designation was the abbreviation of Yaroslavl Trolleybus. Four models were produced in series: YaTB-1, YaTB-2, YaTB-3 and YaTB-4. The YaTB-1 and YaTB-2, as well as the most commonly produced YaTB-4, were conventional single-deck vehicles, whereas the YaTB-3, which was manufactured in limited quantities, was a double-decker. Additionally, the Moscow trolleybus company owned a few imported vehicles of British origin, as well as vehicles from the earlier LK series. The latter was the inaugural trolleybus design developed and manufactured in the USSR, and it was plagued by numerous technical deficiencies.

During the war years the entire trolleybus production was stopped and the new companies used vehicles withdrawn from Moscow. The former manufacturer of the YaTB series in Yaroslavl was converted to the production of engines and artillery tractors with the outbreak of the war. In 1943 an air raid almost completely destroyed the production. When the war ended, the rebuilt plant did not return to trolleybus production, but the transport companies that had opened in large cities had a great need for vehicles. As a solution to this problem, the state leadership issued an order to organize the production of trolleybus vehicles at Plant No. 82 in the Moscow suburb of Tushino. In peacetime, this factory was temporarily without orders - the Soviet Air Force had a sufficient number of piston-engine aircraft, but the necessary jet aircraft were still in the early stages of development and not ready for series production. This decision helped the industry in two ways: On the one hand, it made it possible to build new trolleybuses, while at the same time keeping the factory workers employed. (Note: After the war, the personnel of some military factories without orders were even released on paid leave, which was a great burden on the economy. – Свирин М. Н.: Танковая мощь СССР. Эксмо и др., Москва 2008, ISBN 978-5-699-31700-4 (Russian and in Cyrillic script; German approximately: Michail N. Swirin: Die Panzermacht der UdSSR. Eksmo et al., Moscow 2008), p. 572)

=== Development ===
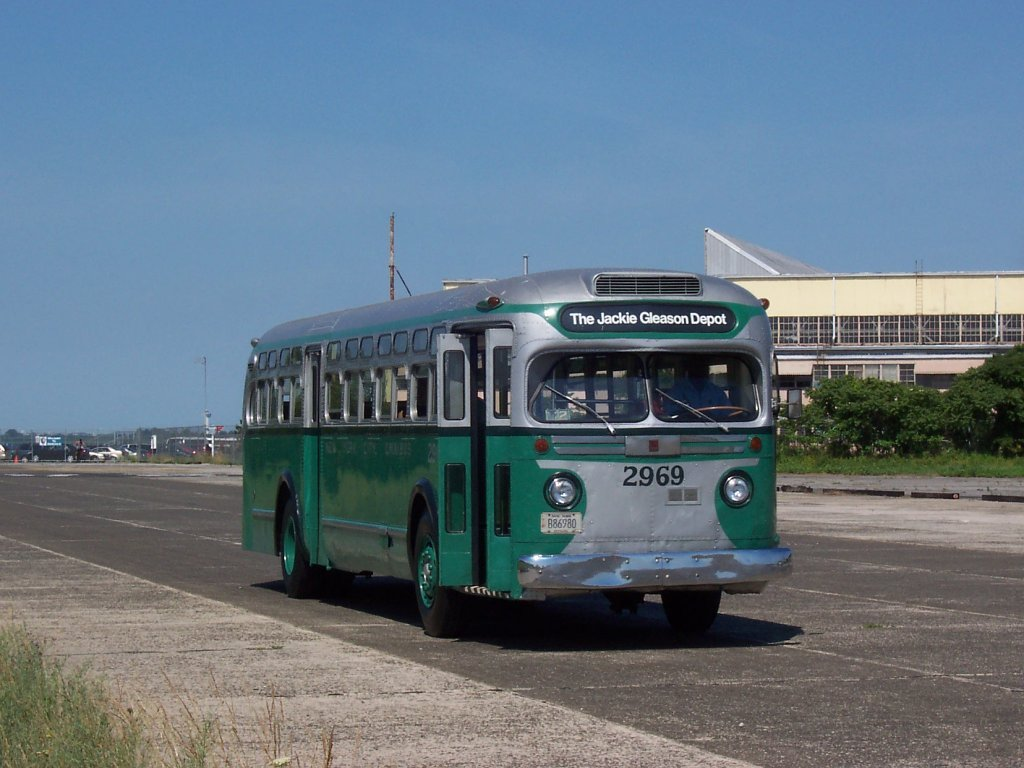
The American GMC TDH-5101 bus built in 1940 was a model for the design

The development of civilian vehicles resumed as early as 1944, with models from the United States exerting a strong influence on the thinking of Soviet designers. The large deliveries under the loan and lease laws during the war, the licenses acquired in the United States for engines and other equipment for their own automotive industry, as well as the many specialists working there, resulted in a very strong orientation to the American school of engineering. Many special features of the vehicles from the United States were adopted by the Soviet industry. US trolleybuses were also the subject of intensive research. In particular, the most advanced models had spacious, self-supporting all-metal bodies and electrical equipment with automatic contactor control. However, the Soviet Union wanted the simplest and cheapest solutions that could be put into production in a short time. As a result, the chassis of the slightly modified pre-war YaTB-5 prototype went into series production at Plant No. 82. The changes in the design of the floor frame, suspension, and power transmission compared to the original design were intended to accommodate a new body. The non-automatic contactor control remained unchanged in its operation, as it had already been implemented in the YaTB-4. Overall, the combination of these technical components can be regarded as a conservative or outdated design, but for the Soviet trolleybus construction it had an advanced component - the all-metal body. The pre-war models, such as the YaTB-4, were equipped with a wooden body, which wore out quickly. The exterior design was based on the YaTB-4 with its sloping double-edged front resembling an iron.

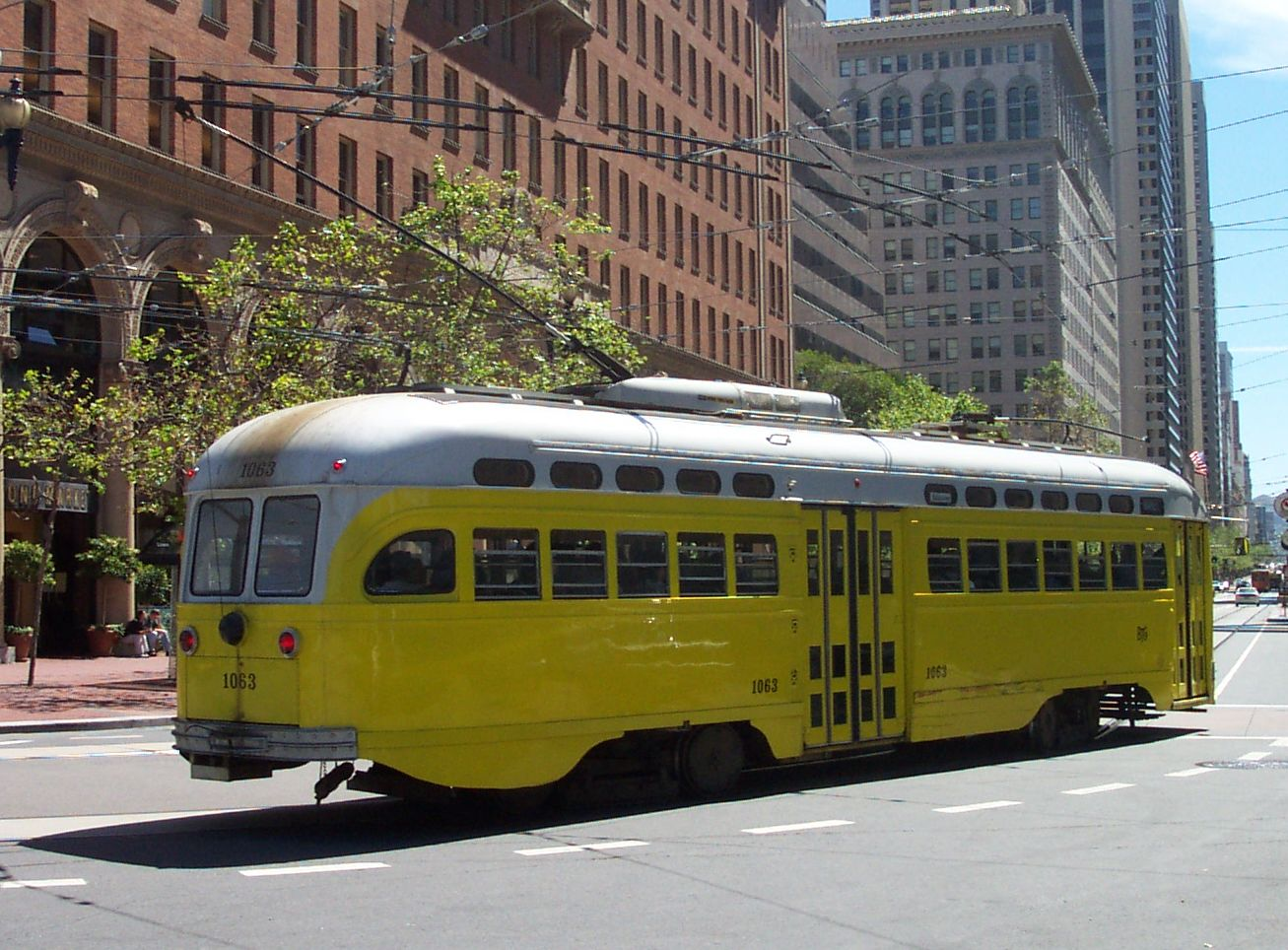
US PCC tram with double row of windows

The sides with two rows of windows (large rectangular ones for seated passengers, small oval ones for standing passengers) and the rear were similar to those of US buses or PCC trams of the time. However, the foreign influence on the exterior design remained limited. The body was made of a lightweight frame and riveted steel plates. The first series-produced MTB-82s left factory no.82 in 1945.

The following year, the manufacturer switched to the next and final version, the MTB-82D. The steel body of the original MTB-82 was considered too heavy by the engineers, so a new, lighter version was developed with an aluminum paneling. The iron-like front section was replaced by a vertical and flat front. The power of the main engine was also increased and the contactor control system was adjusted accordingly. There were no further design changes until the end of production in 1960 or 1961.

=== Series production ===
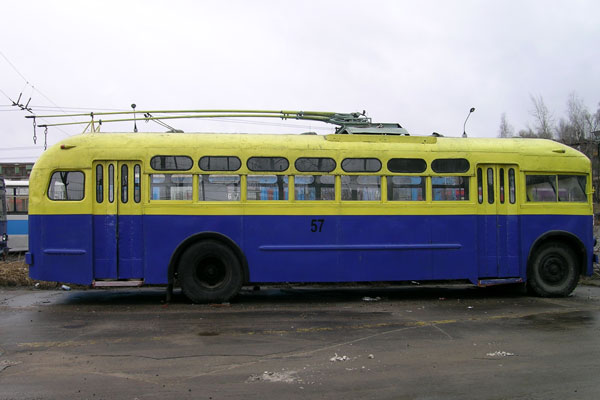
Side view

Plant No. 82 quickly organized the production of bodies for the MTB-82, and by 1945 their number had already exceeded the number of chassis available for assembly. Therefore, fully assembled bodies were used for the conversion of pre-war trolleybuses of type YaTB-1, YaTB-2 or YaTB-4. The wooden body was removed and all mechanical, pneumatic and electrical equipment of the chassis was extensively overhauled (but without replacing it with more modern models). After this work the new body was mounted on the renovated chassis. The trolleybuses modified in this way directly from factory no. 82 received the designation MTB-82M. Externally they did not differ from the "real" MTB-82. Some of these bodies were sold to other transport companies for similar modernization of the old fleet or were delivered with state support.

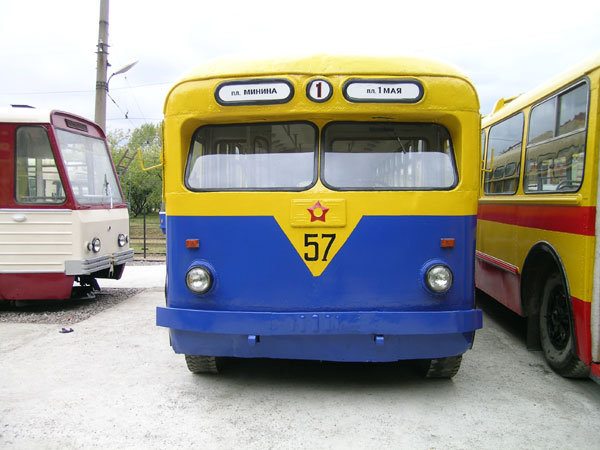
Front section

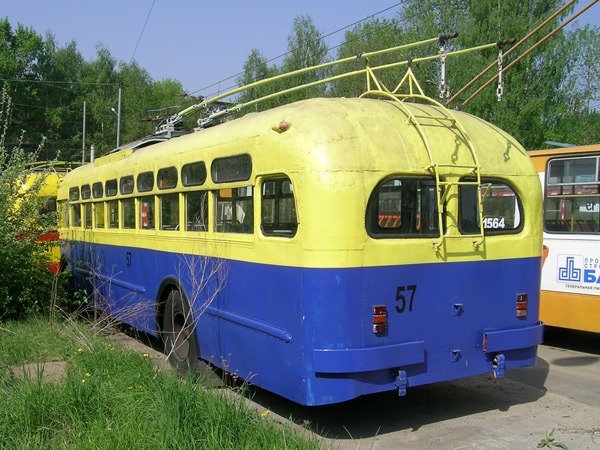
Rear section

Another use for the body parts was found with the tram type MTV-82. The interior of the tram was fundamentally different from that of the trolleybus, which it resembled on the outside, and especially the MTV-82 was not developed on the basis of the MTB-82. In 1945, the Moscow car repair plant SWARS designed the underframe, the bogies and the pneumatic and electric systems of the MTW-82 independently of Plant No. 82. It was only later that the engineers proposed an unusual solution for using the large quantities of available MTB-82 car body parts for the new tram. It also promised a saving in manufacturing costs for both cars. The first experiences with an extended trolleybus body on a tram chassis were not very successful - the flat and wide nose led to difficulties when two vehicles met in the numerous curves of the old narrow streets of Moscow. To solve this problem, the most commonly built variant of the MTV-82 was given a narrower front with sloping surfaces towards the sides of the body. This reduced the number of common body parts. Nevertheless, both vehicles were built in Plant No. 82 and shared many components of the other equipment, such as the passenger seats, the electric heating, light bulbs along with ceiling lights, the pneumatic drive for the windshield wiper, some valves, the measuring devices and so on. This was a favorable factor for the above-mentioned savings.

At the end of the 1940s, Plant No. 82 achieved a stable production of tram and trolleybus vehicles. In view of the further expansion of both types of public transport during the post-war reconstruction, the Soviet economy's demand for such vehicles remained steady and increased. However, tensions in international relations between the former Allies during the Second World War increased. The Soviet government decided to return Plant No. 82 to the production of military aircraft and rocket weapons. Civilian production was to be transferred to other companies. Rīgas Vagonbūves Rūpnīca (Riga Wagon Building Plant, Latvian: Rīgas Vagonbūves Rūpnīca Former Fenix AG) was awarded the contract to build the MTV-82. The resolution of the Council of Ministers of the USSR No. 1761 of February 28, 1950 obliged the Vagonostroitelny Zawod imeni Uritskogo (Moisei Uritsky Wagon Building Plant") in the city of Engels to organize the large-scale production of trolleybuses. In August 1951 the first MTB-82 built there were delivered to the customers. A total of 21 vehicles were produced that year. After the start of assembly line production, the plant, now renamed Zawod imeni Uritskogo (Uritski Plant, ZiU for short), was able to fulfill its plans to build the required number of trolleybuses for export and for its own needs.

The design of the MTB-82 built by ZiU remained unchanged, only the T-shaped emblem of factory no. 82 was replaced by a five-pointed star. There were no further improvements to the design of the vehicle, all efforts were concentrated on the project of a successor type to be worked out by the ZiU engineering collective. The main innovations of this new development were to be a spacious, self-supporting body and an indirect, fully automatic contactor control system. This process went through several intermediate stages and was completed in 1959 with the ZiU-5 trolleybus. It was accepted by the state commission for series production, although the design had some teething troubles. These were solved during production on the assembly line, but the MTB-82 continued to be built until the ZiU-5 reached an acceptable level in mass production. In 1960 the order was given to switch completely to the production of the ZiU-5, but the operational process was "sluggish" in terms of consumption of previously manufactured and stored spare parts. Completed MTB-82 were also stored for some time and delivered to trolleybus operators even after the end of series production. The last ones were delivered in 1961. ZiU built altogether 3746 vehicles of this type.

The total number of MTB-82 built is not exactly known. The documents of the armament factory no. 82 are probably still classified, for the same reason that the tram and trolleybus vehicles built there did not receive a type plate with a factory number. Based on the low capacities and the production time of the factory No. 82 in comparison to the SiU, the total production is estimated at 5000 vehicles.

=== Use ===
From 1945 up to and including 1955 the MTB-82 was delivered to all then existing Soviet trolleybus companies under the supervision of the central management. An alternative appeared only in the last five years of series production. In 1955 the local car repair plant SVARZ in Moscow started to build trolleybuses of the TBES type. From 1957 the Kyiv factory KZET was involved in the production of this model. The Soviet leadership had also decided to import Czechoslovak Škoda 8Tr vehicles for some trolleybus operations in the Baltic States, Western Ukraine and Crimea. Finally, in 1959, the ZiU-5, successor of the MTB-82 in mass production, was selected for the trolleybus fleet in Soviet cities. However, their number (as well as that of the TBES and Škoda 8Tr) was comparatively small until the end of production of the MTB-82. After the JaTB vehicles were phased out, the MTB-82 remained the only type in many cities for a decade or more.

The high production figures led to the dominance of the MTB-82 among the trolleybus models in the USSR. Even after the start of series production of the SiU-5, its share remained significant for quite a long time. MTB-82 were in service in the following cities of the USSR:

- Alma-Ata, today Almaty
- Bryansk
- Kharkiv
- Kherson
- Dnipropetrovsk, today Dnipro
- Frunze, today Bishkek
- Gorki, today Nizhny Novgorod
- Yaroslavl
- Kaliningrad
- Kaluga
- Kamensk-Uralsky
- Kazan
- Kyiv
- Kirov
- Chișinău
- Krasnodar
- Krasnoyarsk
- Kryvyi Rih
- Kutaisi
- Luhansk
- Lviv
- Kuybyshev, today Samara
- Leningrad, today Saint Petersburg
- Minsk
- Moscow
- Novosibirsk
- Odesa
- Omsk
- Penza
- Perm
- Riga
- Ryazan
- Rostov-on-Don
- Zaporizhzhia
- Saratov
- Sevastopol
- Stalingrad, today Volgograd
- Stalino, today Donetsk
- Sverdlovsk, today Yekaterinburg
- Tambov
- Tashkent
- Tbilisi
- Chelyabinsk
- Chernivtsi
- Chiatura (Note: No deliveries ex works, only used vehicles from Tbilisi)
- Chkalov, today Orenburg
- Vilnius
- Vladimir
- Voronezh
- Voroshylovsk, today Alchevsk

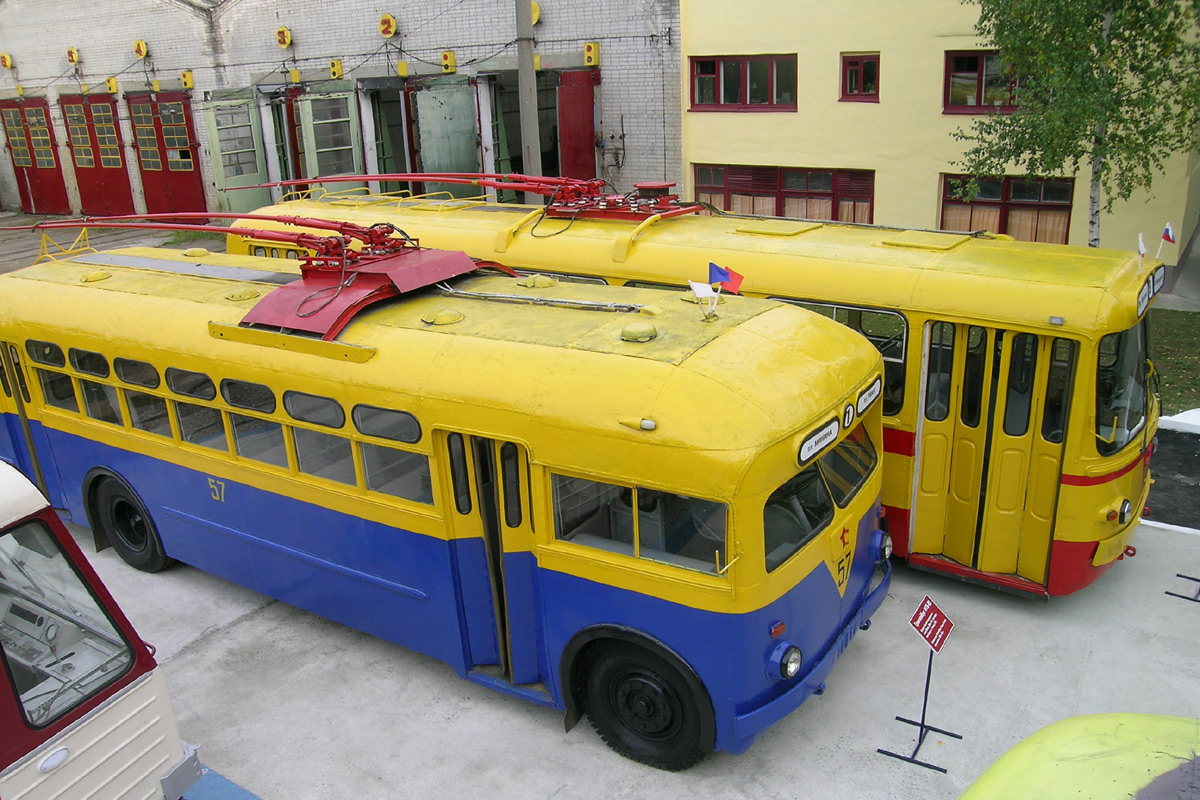
View of the MTB-82 and ZiU-5 trolleybuses from the side

In many Soviet cities trolleybus transport started with this type between 1947 and 1955. Even a few years later, after the introduction of the new types, the MTB-82 was still widely used. In many companies they were gradually replaced in the 1960s by the types ZiU-5, 8Tr or 9Tr. Their technical condition was still quite good, but they were taken out of service due to their technical backwardness. In comparison with their successors, they were inferior from the drivers' and passengers' point of view. Only the mechanics were dissatisfied, because the robust and simple construction of the MTB-82 required much less maintenance and repair work.

In some instances, the MTB-82s remained in service until the 1970s before being ultimately supplanted by the next generation of trolleybuses, the ZiU-9. In general, a depot or maintenance depot infrastructure unsuitable for other trolleybus types was the primary reason for the MTB-82s remaining in service for a longer period. In accordance with the Soviet classification system, the ZiU-5 and ZiU-9, as well as the imported Škoda vehicles, were designated as trolleybuses with a high passenger capacity and larger dimensions than the MTB-82, which was classified as a trolleybus with a medium passenger capacity. Consequently, exits, vehicle halls, lifting platforms, and workshop pits, which were constructed for the MTB-82 without being designed for future larger models, could not be utilized by other vehicles. The requisite conversion of the existing depots or the construction of new facilities necessitated financial resources and time. A similar situation occurred in Gorki, where the final series of ZiU-5D trolleybuses commenced operation alongside the initial ZiU-9s in the isolated network segment in the upper part of the city in 1972, following the construction of a new depot. Prior to this, only the MTB-82s had operated at the trolleybus depot, which first opened in 1947. Each expansion of this network segment was accompanied by the relocation of the older vehicles of this type from the trolleybus network in the Sormowo district. In Sormovo, they were replaced by ZiU-5s, as the depot there was able to accommodate the new fleet.

Additionally, there was no necessity for large-capacity vehicles in individual towns with relatively low passenger volumes.

=== Double traction and trailer operation ===
In general, the MTB-82 was utilized in a solo capacity, although on occasion it was employed in conjunction with trailers. The inaugural tests in this regard were conducted with decommissioned buses, which served as non-motorized sidecars. In the early 1960s, the ZiS-155 was employed for this purpose in Moscow and Tbilisi, while the ZiL-158 was utilized in Crimea. Additionally, MTB-82s lacking engines were utilized as trailers in Leningrad.

The experience gained facilitated the development of double trolleybus traction. In June 1966, an MTB-82 team was formed in Kyiv on a trial basis. Initially, the second vehicle was carried without traction, but this led to the motor of the leading vehicle being overloaded. As a result, a multiple control system was developed. This was made available in September 1966, enabling the use of the double traction system, the first of its kind in the world. The current was picked up by the leading vehicle, and the brakes also had to be synchronized. In contrast to later train formations with other types, the 21.73-meter-long MTB-82 double traction units could be separated at the terminals for off-peak operation. In 1967, another double traction unit was constructed in Kiev and subjected to rigorous testing.

The assembly of additional double-traction units was conducted at the Kyiv "Dzerzhinsky" Electric Transport Plant (abbreviated KZET Russian: Киевский завод электротранспорта им. Дзержинского), which also constructed its own trolleybuses. From November 1967 to the end of 1968, a further 47 trains were completed at the facility, bringing the total number of MTB-82 double units in Kiev to 49. The MTB-82 double traction units were subsequently replaced by Škoda-9Tr double traction units by 1973. No further MTB-82 double traction units were produced in series. In 1970, Moscow assembled a double traction unit for experimental purposes.

The advantage of double traction was the approximately one-third higher transport capacity compared to an articulated vehicle and the lower manpower requirement compared to two single vehicles. Compared to the combination of trolleybus and trailer, the trolleybus double traction units had the advantage of double motorization and the associated better driving dynamics.

=== Export ===
The MTB-82 was also exported to several Central and Eastern European countries, including Bulgaria, Hungary, and Romania. In 1947, the Bulgarian capital of Sofia received ten units, as did Plovdiv. Between 1949 and 1952, Budapest received a total of 53 units, bearing the operating numbers T100 to T152. Eight trolleybuses with the numbers 4001 to 4008 were delivered to the Bucharest trolleybus for the opening of operations in the fall of 1949. Five additional vehicles were transferred to the Timișoara trolleybus in 1953, but were taken out of service as early as 1964. According to other sources, they were also utilized in Yugoslavia.

== Technical description ==
=== Floor frame and body ===
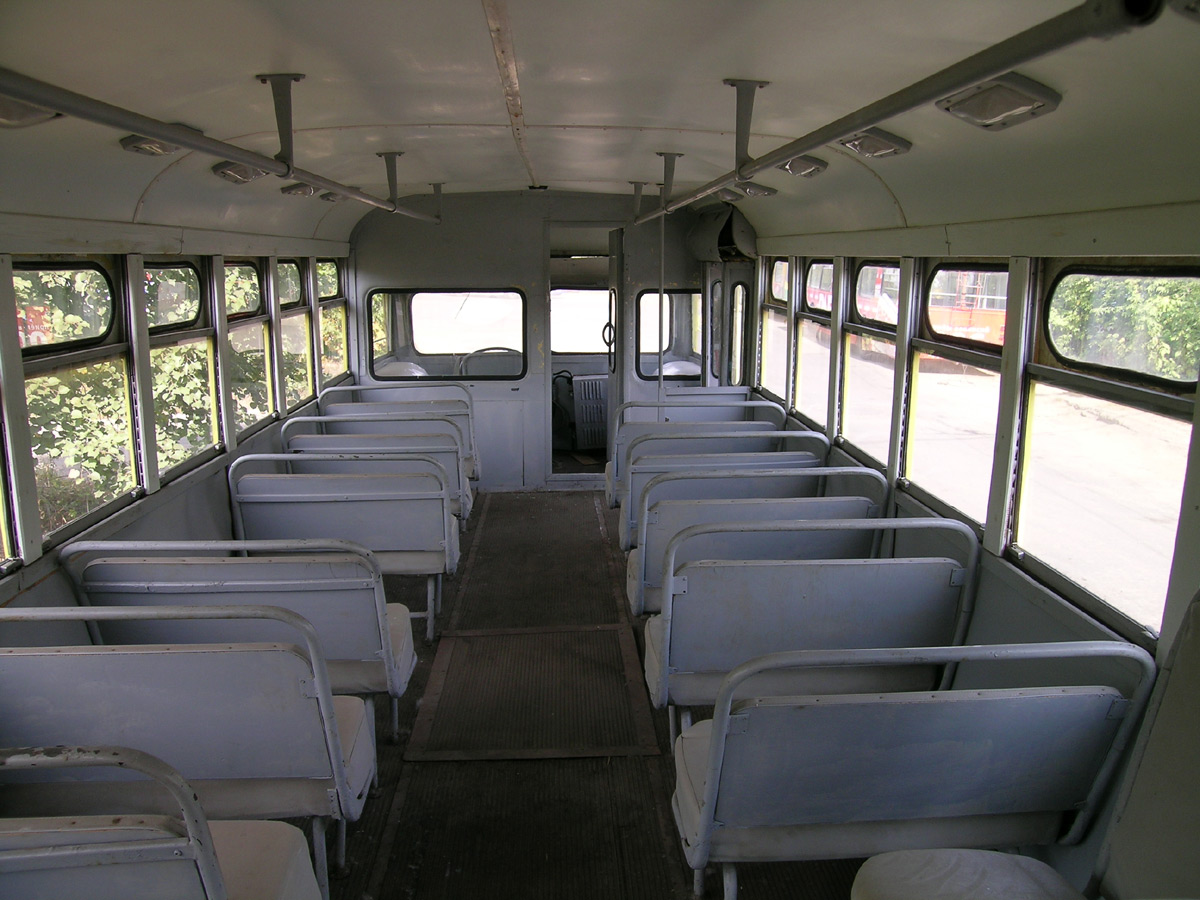
The passenger compartment, looking towards the driver's cab

The MTB-82D was a vehicle with a load-bearing floor frame. This was assembled using welded and riveted connections from two longitudinal beams and eight cross beams, in addition to supports for various devices. The longitudinal beams were formed from curved sectional steel, while the design of the cross beams depended on the respective function. The substantial beams, which guaranteed the robust construction of the frame, were composed of bent steel tubes, while the planking of the wagon body was supported by lightweight angle steels. The robust frame fulfilled two primary functions: firstly, it absorbed both static and dynamic mechanical loads and counteracted deformations. Secondly, the majority of other significant components and assemblies were attached to various points on the floor frame, including the car body, sprung wheel axles, main engine, starting and braking resistors, compressor with electric drive, air tanks and other pneumatic devices, as well as the accumulator housing.

Schematic representation of the interior: Yellow: Passenger compartment with seats Green: Driver's cab Red: Door areas Pink: Conductor's seat

The removable body of the MTB-82D was constructed using a completely welded frame made of bent light section steel of various thicknesses and cross-sections. This framework was clad with aluminum plates. Due to the dissimilar materials used in the construction of the car body, the framework and plates were riveted together. The connection of the different metals for the superstructure (aluminum as cladding and iron in the steel of the framework) should have caused galvanic corrosion of the metal with the higher standard potential, i.e. the aluminum. However, there were no complaints about this design solution, and the body was sufficiently durable overall. Additionally, a rubber runner was fitted to the roof covering to reduce the risk of slipping and electric shock for mechanics during maintenance work. The interior of the coach body was clad in varnished plywood. The plank floor was supported on the floor frame and had a non-slip rubber covering. In the event of accidental damage, the carriage body could be replaced with a new one.

The coach body is divided into three sections: the driver's cab, the passenger compartment, and the underfloor compartment. The floor frame, to which the equipment was attached, constituted the underfloor compartment. Several hatches and maintenance openings in the floor provided access to these parts and equipment, while a flap in the left-hand side skirt offered additional access. The electric motor was positioned between the axles and transmitted power to the rear axle via a cardan shaft. The vehicle was equipped with an entrance with a folding door situated behind each of the two axles. The door drives were mounted in housings located above the entrances. The driver's compartment was situated to the left of the center of the car body and was separated from the passenger compartment by a bulkhead with an entrance door. The contactors of the indirect control system of the main engine were installed in a housing on the left side of the driver's cab. The passenger compartment consisted of the small front door area adjacent to the driver's cab, the approximately larger catchment area at the rear door, the running boards, the slightly raised conductor's seat, and the two-seater upholstered benches with 2+2 seating and a central aisle. The MTB-82 was thus designed for passenger flow, with boarding at the rear. Some interior metal components, such as grab rails and handles, were coated with chrome for aesthetic purposes and to protect against corrosion.

From the outside, the body of the MTB-82D was painted ex works in a single scheme: yellow roof, upper section with "decorative peak" at the front, blue middle section and aprons; the MTB-82D in the Nizhny Novgorod Museum has such a scheme. All other variants were repainted in the course of a modernization in the different trolleybus companies. The "blue trolleybus", in most cases a MTB-82, was typical for Soviet cities in the 1950s. It became a symbol of the era and found its way into the cultural sector. For example, in documentary and art photography, in feature films and in the work of the poet and singer Bulat Okudzhava.

=== Mechanical equipment ===
The mechanical parts of the MTB-82 were typical of the trolleybuses manufactured in the 1940s and 1950s. The equipment included

- The front axle with worm gear steering;
- the rear drive axle with the differential gear of the worm gear differential, which is rare in vehicle construction;
- Power transmission from the main engine rotor to the differential consisting of a reduction gear and a cardan shaft;
- Suspension of the axles to the body - four semi-elliptical leaf springs, two per wheel axle;
- drum brakes on all wheels

When braking, the pressure of the shoes on the drum was regulated by the pneumatic drive and brake return springs. There was also a hand parking brake with rods and levers for holding the vehicle on downhill gradients. Use of the hand brake while driving was permitted only in the event of technical failure of the air brake system.

=== Electrical equipment ===
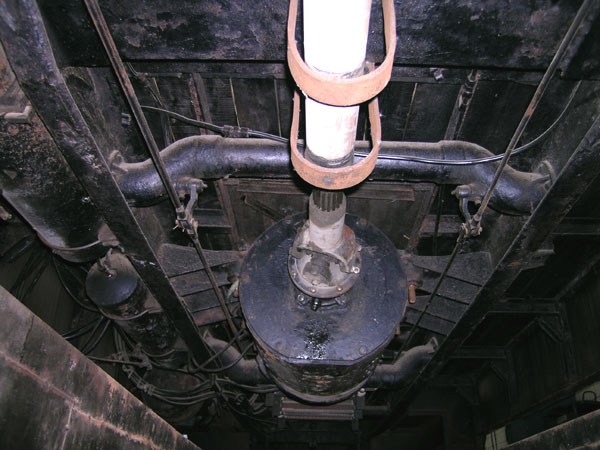
The DK-202B main motor of an MTB-82

The electrical equipment of the MTB-82 can be divided into two main circuits and one auxiliary circuit. The vehicle received its electrical power from a two-pole overhead contact line via two conventional rotating pantographs without a retriever. It was designed for a mains voltage of 600 volts direct current.

The contact line served as a direct power source for both circuits. The DK-201 traction double-circuit motor (DK-202B in the MTB-82D version), the starting and braking resistors, the reversing switch, the circuit breaker, and the contactors of the control systems constituted the main circuit responsible for driving. Another important component was a so-called "radio reactor." This choke was connected in series to suppress radio interference, thereby preventing the emission of unwanted high-frequency signals.

In addition to the aforementioned equipment, a number of other consumers and devices constituted the auxiliary circuit:

- The interior lighting of the passenger compartment, the exterior lighting, and the lighting of the driver's cab are of particular interest in this context.
- The direction indicators, brake lights, and horn.
- The compressor drive.
- The control system for the contactors of the main engine circuit.
- The heating of the passenger compartment.
- The test apparatus included a voltmeter and ammeter.
- The cessation of movement initiated by the passenger or conductor to the driver.
- A set of fuses is provided for the protection of devices in the auxiliary circuit from overcurrent.

The equipment was also operated via the 600-volt power source. Some of the components operated at relatively low voltages, such as the incandescent lamps of the interior lighting of the passenger compartment and the control circuits of the contactors, which were designed for a working voltage of 100-120 volts. Nevertheless, the MTB-82 lacked a subsystem that was electrically isolated from the overhead line, which would have enabled the appropriate voltage to be supplied to these consumers. Instead, they were connected in series or through series resistors, which resulted in a sufficiently reduced voltage. In the event of a power failure in the overhead contact line, the pantographs were designed to either jump off the wires or stop with the pantographs lowered. In such an instance, the functionality of the aforementioned devices was supported by accumulator batteries. It was not possible to operate the system in an emergency mode using the battery, even for distances of a few metres.

The auxiliary circuit design exhibited two significant shortcomings. Primarily, it lacked complete safety in the event of a severe overvoltage in the vehicle's electrical system. Potential causes of such incidents included lightning strikes or high-voltage remote lines falling on trolleybus power lines. The electromagnetic circuit breaker exhibited a certain reaction time and was unable to immediately disconnect the internal circuits of the trolleybus from the dangerous voltage. Prior to disconnection without galvanic isolation from the overhead line, the strong current could potentially damage or even destroy the low-voltage equipment. Secondly, the installed series resistors only converted power into heat, which reduced the overall efficiency of the consumers.

The main component of the MTB-82's electrical equipment was the DK-201 traction motor with a rated output of 74 kilowatts, or the 80 or 86 kilowatt (Note: Different sources indicate different nominal outputs for the DK-202B version.) DK-202B in the MTB-82D sub-series. Both variants were DC machines and double-circuit motors with a commutator. The driver controlled the current in the rotor and field windings of the motor step by step by means of the pedal control switch, thus controlling the acceleration when starting the trolleybus and its driving speed. This device was the core of the MTB-82's indirect contactor control. The position of the brake and accelerator pedals determined the switching on and off of the contactors, i.e. the current in the various circuits of the main motor and thus its operating mode. However, the driver had to take care of the correct sequence of the control variables when accelerating, driving at a constant speed, or braking. Although the drive switch had some safeguards against misoperation, e.g. simultaneous use of the brake and accelerator pedals, it did not operate automatically, so that the regulation of the speed and torque of the drive motor for its safe operation remained the responsibility of the driver. There were 11 acceleration stages and three braking stages in the device; only the 8th and 11th acceleration stages were suitable for unlimited use at constant (medium and high) speed. The electrical circuit of the 11th acceleration stage was specially designed to prevent the speed of the armature of the traction motor from increasing when the speed exceeded 55 km/h. The armature was connected to the rear axle by a reduction gear and a cardan shaft. The armature was connected to the rear axle by a reduction gear and a cardan shaft. The armature was connected to the rear axle by a primary reduction gear and cardan shaft, effectively creating a kind of recuperative brake in which the excess kinetic energy of the vehicle was converted into electrical current and fed back into the overhead line. The maximum speed of the MTB-82 was therefore limited to 55 km/h. During actual braking, the motor and resistors acted as an electrodynamic brake through a special circuit. This allowed the vehicle to be slowed down to a speed of five to ten kilometers per hour in an emergency, even when there was no voltage in the power grid; a complete stop was achieved using the hand or air brake. However, unlike trams, the resistance brake was only an aid because of its limited effect on the rear axle. The main braking mechanism of the MTB-82 was pneumatic.

=== Pneumatic equipment ===
The MTB-82 trolleybuses were equipped with pneumatic systems for operating the braking system, door drives and windshield wipers. This equipment included a compressor (driven by an electric motor), an air filter, a pressure gauge, three air reservoirs, a main air line with an electro-pneumatic pressure regulator, and mechanical safety and check valves. The normal operating pressure was in the range of 4 to 6 atmospheres. The safety valve was designed to provide emergency relief in the event of a dangerous increase in air pressure above 8 atmospheres due to failure of the pressure regulator. The check valves in the pneumatic system were used to maintain air pressure in the event of a pressure loss due to the leaky discharge valve of the shutdown compressor. Other valves, fixed steel piping, flexible rubber connecting hoses, and the above-mentioned compressed air consumers were also used.

== Substructure types ==
The MTB-82 was produced in three variants:

- The basic model MTB-82, also called MTB-82A in some sources. This variant can be recognized by its sloping double-edged front section. The main features were the steel body and the DK-201 engine with 74 kilowatts of power.
- The most frequently built subtype was the MTB-82D. This variant had a body with aluminum cladding and a vertical and flat front. The engine was replaced by the more powerful DK-202B version with 80 or 86 kilowatts of power and corresponding adaptation of the control circuits.
- Modernization of old YaTB-1, -2 or -4 vehicles, designated MTB-82M. In this variant, MTB-82 or MTB-82D bodies were mounted on a refurbished YaTB chassis. Externally, these conversions did not differ from the production cars.

The special model MTB-82VSKhV existed only in very small numbers for the former trolleybus line on the area of the Exhibition of Achievements of National Economy, today's All-Russian Exhibition Center. (Note: The name МТБ-82ВСХВ is derived from the abbreviation ВСХВ Russian Всесоюзная сельскохозяйственная выставка for the All-Union Agricultural Exhibition) This variant was somewhat more comfortable than the standard version. For example, the combination of a rectangular pane at the bottom and an oval pane at the top of the window strip was replaced by a single large pane for better visibility. The upper edge of the window row was decorated with light bulbs.

Various machine factories, trolleybus companies and maintenance workshops also produced trolleybuses similar to the MTB-82. Sometimes they used spare parts from real MTB-82s in their designs. For example, the Gorki factory No. 21, a manufacturer of fighter planes, built in 1947 a trolleybus as a gift for the inhabitants of the city. This vehicle, very similar to the MTB-82, was used to launch trolleybus services in the city, but it was unreliable in operation and at one million rubles (Note: For comparison, the cost price of the T-34 medium tank, which was manufactured in 1942 in Gorky by the neighboring plant No. 112 "Krasnoye Sormovo", was 209,700 rubles – Свирин М. Н.: Танковая мощь СССР. Эксмо и др., Москва 2008, ISBN 978-5-699-31700-4. (Russian and in Cyrillic script; German approximately: Mikhail N. Svirin: The Armored Power of the USSR. Eksmo et al., Moscow 2008), page 614) was four times more expensive than the standard Tushino trolleybuses. However, these self-built or rebuilt vehicles are not considered to be MTB-82 variants. In addition, the Moscow repair plant SVARZ also upgraded used YaTB trolleybuses using MTB-82 spare parts; these vehicles were designated MTB-10.

== Design analysis ==
The evaluation of the design differs from different points of view. As mentioned above, the MTB-82 was technically outdated soon after its introduction. The combination of a solid floor frame with a removable lightweight body and non-automatic contactor control, typical for trolleybuses of the 1930s, became obsolete in the next decade. New design solutions began to emerge that had already been widely used in the electrically powered vehicles of the 1950s. In addition to the disadvantages caused by the basic design, the MTB-82 had a number of other negative features. These had their origin in the development phase. The most serious technical shortcomings were:

Characteristic values	MTB-82D	LOWA W 601
Year(s) of construction	1946–1960	1951
Length in meters	10,4	10,4
Seats	38	29
Standing room for 8 passengers/m²	48	45
Mass including payload, tons	15,6	16,0
Power, kW	80	120
Power/mass with passengers, kW/t	5,1	7,5

- The large empty mass combined with the insufficient power of the main engine. The more spacious ZiU-5 with a length of 11.8 meters had an empty mass of about 9.8 tons compared to 9.2 tons and 10.4 meters for the MTB-82. The contemporary GDR trolleybuses of the LOWA series W 601/W 602, which were similar in weight and passenger capacity to the MTB-82, had a more powerful main engine (see table).
- The lack of power steering. Together with the previous deficiency, this made the driver's work very tiring.
- Lack of low voltage circuits. The contactors were switched on and off by an auxiliary circuit with a voltage of 100 volts, but this subsystem was not electrically isolated from the high-voltage circuit with 600 volts. As a result, the driver operated a drive switch that operated at a dangerous voltage. In the event of a failure, there was a risk of electric shock or fire.
- The contactor control of the main engine did not work automatically, and only two speed levels were suitable for unlimited use at constant speed. Shifting gears incorrectly during acceleration, and especially running for long periods in inappropriate gears, could result in overheating and damage to the starting resistors. In the worst case, this could result in a fire. Therefore, the driver should have some experience in order to drive the MTB-82 safely; the vehicle was not easy and safe to drive for beginners.
- The disproportionately large cab was difficult to heat in winter. Former employees of the Nizhny Novgorod Trolleybus Company recalled that in frosty weather the driver had to wear a large fur coat and watch the traffic through a slit in the icy windshield next to the weak heater. They compared the experience to driving a tank. Working in such harsh conditions was particularly difficult for the company's many female drivers.

From the passenger's point of view, the MTB-82 was not comfortable either:

- The narrow doors and very small front door area prevented passengers, especially those with bulky luggage or baby carriages, from changing quickly. The narrow aisle between the seats made it difficult for passengers to move around and for the conductor to work.
- The small windows, low ceiling and narrow seats made tall people uncomfortable. In addition, the lack of a public address system made it difficult to know where to get off when there was a large crowd.

Regardless, the MTB-82 was a significant success from a transportation point of view in the late 1940s. In terms of capacity, it surpassed almost all other Soviet trolleybuses, buses and tramcars, with the exception of the four-axle LM-33 and MTV-82 large-capacity tramcars. However, production of the LM-33 ended in 1941, and this model was used only in Leningrad. Its successor, the LM-49, appeared in 1949 and was available to other cities from the mid-1950s. The MTW-82 was not yet widely used in this period and required much more money, raw materials and effort in production compared to the MTB-82.

Technical data of individual Soviet vehicles of the 1930s for public urban transport
Characteristics	MTB-82D	YaTB-4A	Kh/M	KM/KP	LM/LP-33	GAZ-03-30
Transportation	Trolleybus	Trolleybus	Tram	Tram	Tram	Bus
Years of construction	1946–1960	1938–1941	1928–1941	1929–1935, 1945/1946	1933–1941	1933–1941, 1945–1950
Type	Solo bus	Solo bus	Train consisting of Tv and Bv	Train consisting of Tv and Bv	Train consisting of Tv and Bv	Solo bus
Axle or wheel formula	4 × 2	4 × 2	Bo+2	Bo'Bo'+2'2'	Bo'Bo'+2'2'	4 × 2
Length in meters	10,4	9,3	9,8 + 9,8	12,6 + 12,6	15,0 + 15,0	5,3
Seats	38	35	24 + 24	38 + 38	49 + 52	16
Standing room for eight passengers per square meter	48	13	76 + 90	48 + 62	129 + 150	not provided
Empty weight, tons	9,25	7,64	?	?	22,2 + 16,2	2,3
Power, kW	1×80	1×74	2×50	4×40	4×40	1×37
Power/weight without passengers, kW/t	8,6	9,7	?	?	4,2	16,1

Technical data of individual Soviet urban transportation vehicles of the 1940s
Characteristics	MTB-82D	KTM/KTP-1	MTV-82	ZiS-154
Transportation	Trolleybus	Tram	Tram	Bus
Years of construction	1946–1960	1947–1961	1947–1961	1946–1950
Type	Solo bus	Train consisting of Tv and Bv	Solo railcar	Solo bus
Axle or wheel formula	4 × 2	Bo+2	Bo'Bo'	4 × 2
Length in meters	10,4	10 + 10	13,6	9,5
Seats	38	16 + 15	40	34
Standing room for eight passengers per square meter	48	100 + 108	140	26
Empty weight, tons	9,25	12,5 + 8	17,5	8,1
Power, kW	1×80	2×50	4×55	1×83
Power/weight without passengers, kW/t	8,6	4,9	12,6	10,2

In the context of the post-war period, the deficiency of trained specialist personnel constituted a significant challenge for the country's economy as a whole. The MTB-82's straightforward, robust, and durable design proved its value in this regard. If the requisite maintenance was carried out correctly, the technology was also reliable. This characteristic allowed for operation even in the absence of highly qualified mechanics. Concurrently, this was appreciated by numerous maintenance personnel and a few drivers who conducted the maintenance themselves, which led them to overlook the indisputable deficiencies of the MTB-82.

In conclusion, these factors, in conjunction with the extensive utilization of the MTB-82 and its prolonged operational lifespan, substantiate the financial viability of the design.

== Vehicles received ==
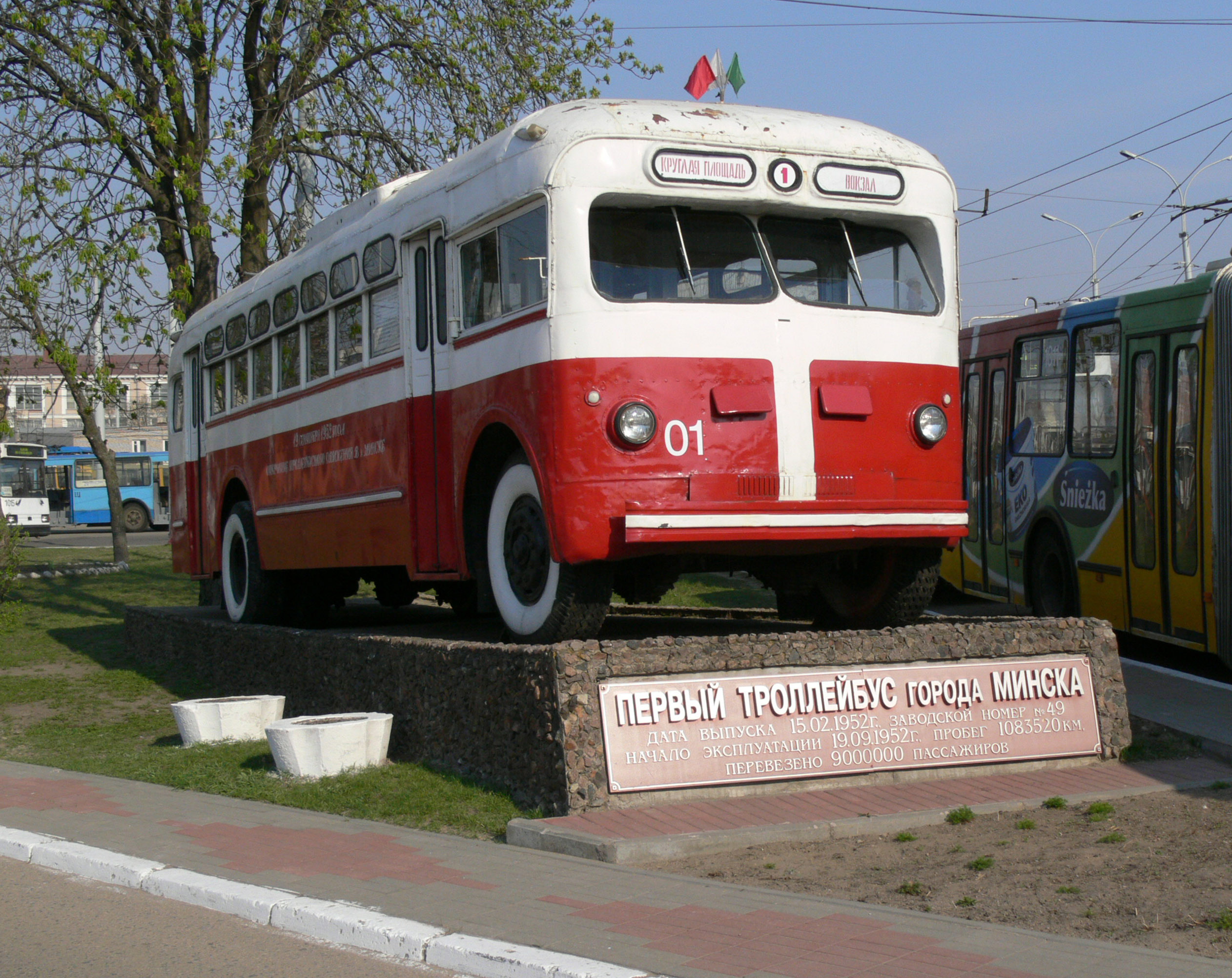
The city of Minsk's first trolleybus, an MTB-82D, as a technical monument in trolleybus depot no. 1

Some of the decommissioned MTB-82s were not scrapped immediately, but were reused as sheds, garden sheds or construction trailers, as in the example of an example in the Chernobyl exclusion zone. Some transport companies also converted individual vehicles in good condition into work vehicles for service purposes. This resulted in training vehicles, mobile repair workshops or staff canteens.

Due to their significance in the history of Soviet transport, a number of organizations and transport enthusiasts have also begun to restore vehicles of this once most numerous Soviet trolleybus type. The Museum of Public Transport in Moscow and the Museum of Electric City Transport in St. Petersburg each have a roadworthy and a non-roadworthy MTB-82. The two roadworthy trolleybuses frequently take part in vehicle exhibitions. In Nizhny Novgorod and Chișinău, one MTB-82 each, although roadworthy, is displayed outdoors as a technical monument. The Minsk trolleybus depot no. 1 also has an MTB-82 designated as a monument, meaning that a total of seven MTB-82s have been preserved. Also, in Chernivtsi, Ukraine, one MTB-82 has been observed operating on city streets as recently as December 2004, and thus it appears that such a bus has indeed been preserved in the Chernivtsi transit system and is seen on the roads there carrying passengers. A photograph of such a Chernivtsi bus, of unknown date, exists bearing fleet number 8.

== Bibliography ==
- A. Sorokin, M. Russell: MTB-82 – the trolleybus „for all times“. In: Trolleybus Magazine, Volume 44, Issue Number 280, National Trolleybus Association, ISSN 0266-7452, pages 74–77
- А. Шанин: МТВ–82: шаг вперед, два шага назад. – Альманах «Железнодорожное дело», 2000, №4. (Russian and in Cyrillic script; German approximately: A. Schanin: Der MTW-82: ein Schritt vorwärts, zwei Schritte rückwärts. In: Almanach Schelesnodoroschnoje delo (eng. „Railroads“), 2000, No. 4)
- И. С. Ефремов, В. М. Кобозев: Механическое оборудование троллейбусов. Москва, Транспорт, 1978. (Russian and in Cyrillic script; German approximately: I. S. Jefremow, W. M. Kobosew.: Die mechanische Ausrüstung der Oberleitungsbusse. Transport, Moscow 1978)
- Д. И. Перкис: Учебное пособие для слесарей по ремонту троллейбусов. Москва, Стройиздат, 1966. (Russian and in Cyrillic script; German approximately: D. I. Perkis. Das Mechanikerlehrbuch für die Instandsetzung von Oberleitungsbussen. Strojisdat, Moscow 1966)
- Ю. М. Коссой: 50 лет нижегородскому троллейбусу. Нижний Новгород, Литера, 1997, ISBN 978-5-900915-13-5 (Russian and in Cyrillic script; German approximately: Ju. M. Kossoj. 50 Jahre Nischni Nowgoroder Trolleybus, Litera, Nischni Nowgorod 1997)
- Л. М. Шугуров: Автомобили России и СССР. Часть II. Москва, ИЛБИ, 2000, ISBN 978-5-87483-006-9 (Russian and in Cyrillic script; German approximately: L. M. Shugurov. Die Automobile Russlands und der UdSSR. Teil II. ILBI, Moscow 2000)
- Веклич В.П. Поїзд із тролейбусів МТБ-82 з керуванням за системою "багатьох одиниць" // Міське господарство України. — 1967. — No. 2. — С. 37-38. — ISSN 0130-1284
