= ZiU-5 =

Soviet trolleybus model

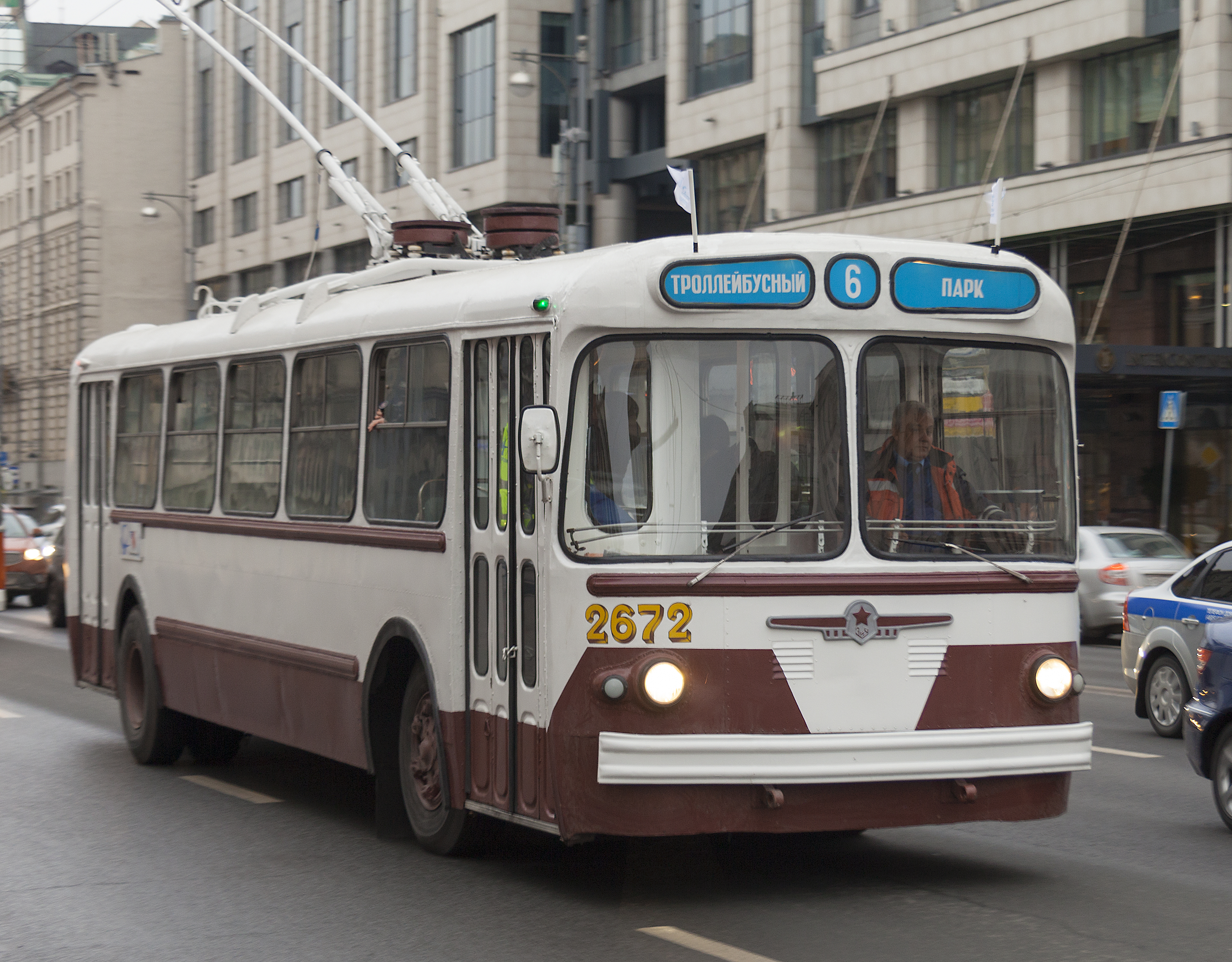
1966 ZiU-5

The ZiU-5 (Russian: ЗиУ-5) is a Soviet trolleybus model that was built by the Uritsky factory. The ZiU acronym stands for Zavod imeni Uritskogo (Russian: Завод имени Урицкого, ЗиУ), which translates as Plant named after Uritskiy (Moisei Uritsky, a Russian revolutionary). This model of city trolleybus was in mass production from 1959 to 1972. The total number of ZiU-5s produced exceeded 14,500 vehicles. This allowed the ZiU-5 to become dominant model of trolleybus in Soviet towns and cities of that time. The last vehicles were withdrawn from active service in the mid-1980s (the exact date varies from city to city). The small number of surviving vehicles are kept now for museum purposes.

== History of development ==
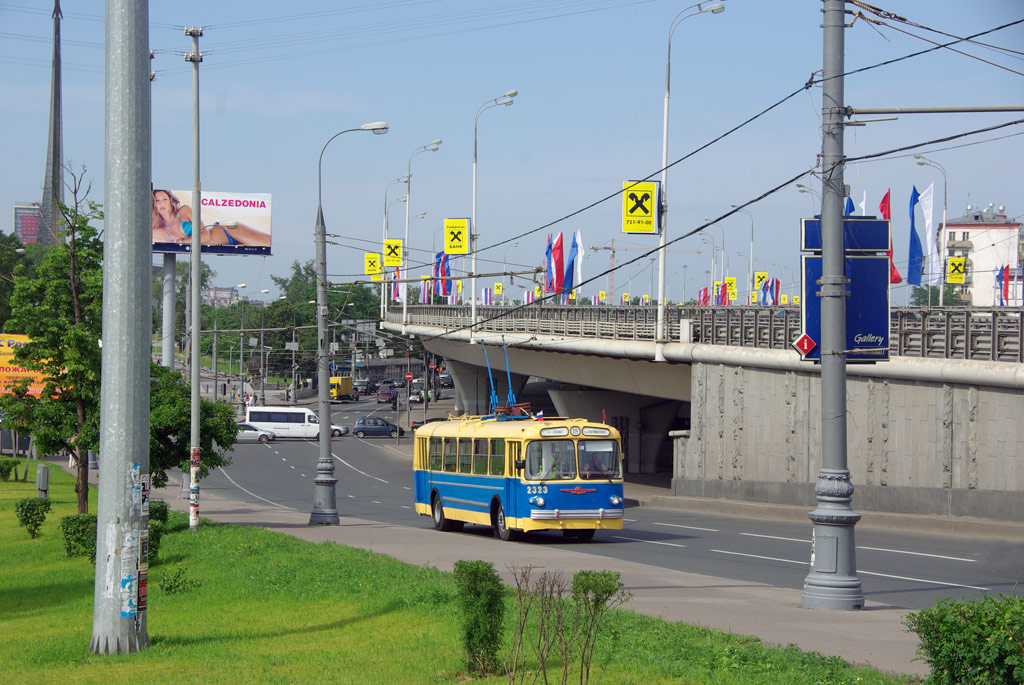
Preserved ZiU-5 from 1959

The first decade after the Second World War was a period of huge expansion of trolleybus systems in the Soviet Union. They were considered as an innovative decision in comparison with "semi-obsolete" and expensive trams. The mainstay for trolley fleet for that time was extremely simple, reliable and durable MTB-82 vehicle. But it was medium-sized and uncomfortable for both driver and passengers. After small series and experimental TBU-1 vehicles ZiU developed completely new model for mass production with all disadvantages of MTB-82 eliminated. This was first variant of ZiU-5. More than 200 vehicles were produced for wide testing on Moscow streets in 1959. This huge testing work discovered the weaknesses of new design. Trolley depots in collaboration with ZiU and "Dynamo" electric motors factory fixed the problems in their repair facilities. Using this experience ZiU engineers corrected the ZiU-5 design, in 1960 new updated mass production series was launched. During mass production some technological adjustments were made, see Variants section. In 1971 ZiU introduced completely new trolleybus design, the ZiU-9. It was more cheap due to technology improvements and refusal from aluminium hull and was able to carry more passengers than ZiU-5. So mass production of ZiU-5 ceased in 1972.

== Variants ==
- ZiU-5 model 1959 with pneumatic door gear, combined front glasses and three rear windows
- ZiU-5 model 1960 with electric door gear, strengthened hull, single front glasses and one rear window
- ZiU-5G with minor technological improvements, recognizable by small rear route pointer window
- ZiU-5D, small rear route window removed, new Hungarian backbridge unit installed instead Soviet-made one.

== Operators ==
=== ZiU-5s in Budapest ===
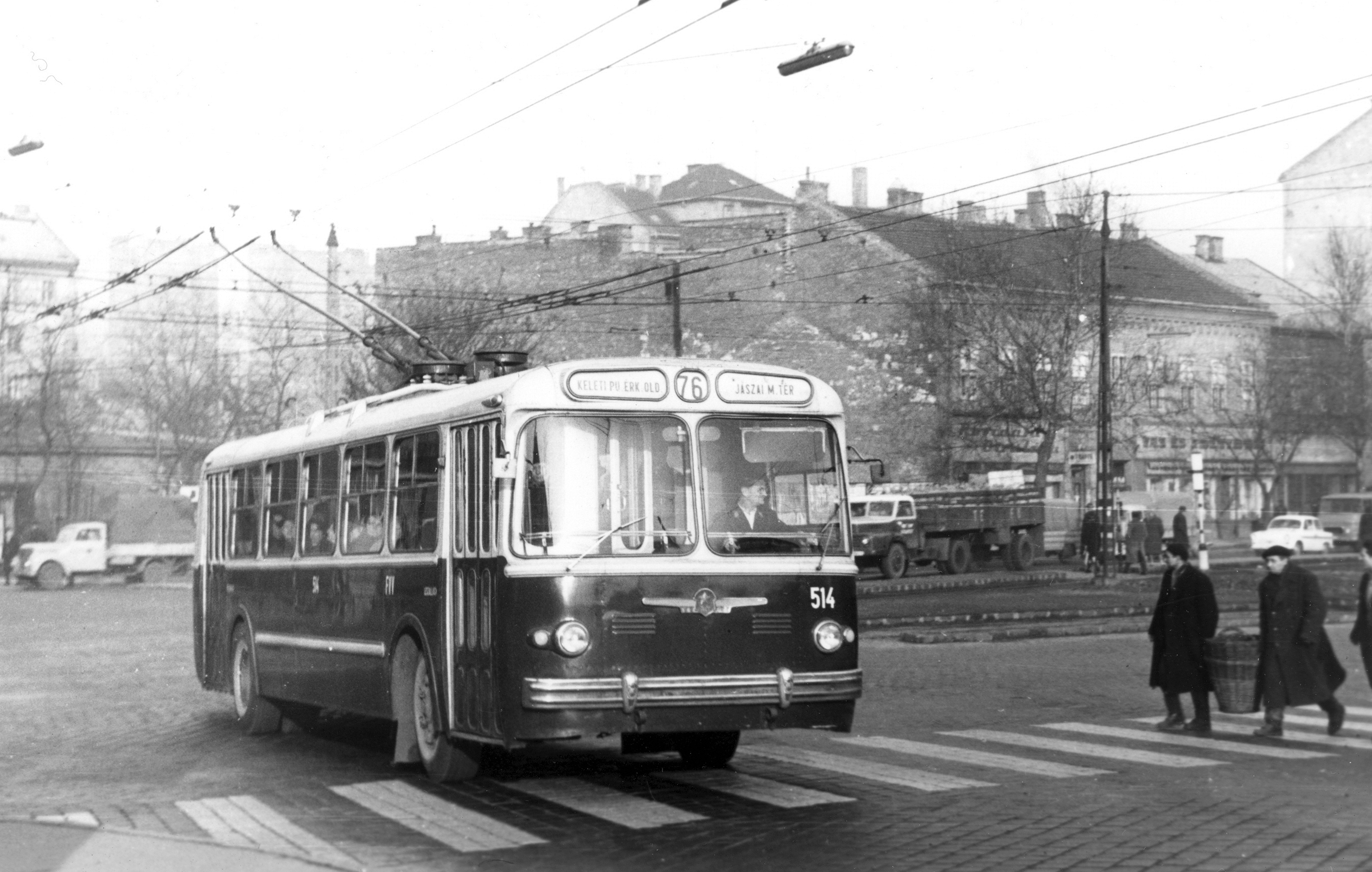
Budapest ZiU-5 (1966)

Budapest transport operator FVV (roughly: Electric Tramways Company of the Capital), later BKV (Budapest Transport Company) ordered altogether 100 ZiU-5 vehicles between 1966 and 1969. These cars, equipped with power steering and automatic controllers, were relatively modern compared to the trolleybuses running on the streets of Budapest that time. On the other hand, in some ways they proved seriously impractical. The cars were rather long but had only two passenger doors. Moreover, having no cab window on the right side impaired the driver's vision to the right, which was worked around by further narrowing the front door. These problems ended the career of the Budapest ZiU-5 fleet very soon, and all (except for one preserved car) got scrapped by 1982. However, this is not the end of the ZiU5- story. Between 1975 and 1978, BKV obtained 79 articulated Ikarus 280 bus bodies together with an Ikarus 260 solo bus body, and installed the electric system of the ZiU-5s in parallel with the scrapping. (The solo program was discontinued due to the cheaper obtainment of ZiU-9 solo trolleybuses. The only Ikarus 260 trolleybus was scrapped in the late '90s, but a pastiche of it is preserved as a heritage car and is restored in its original livery.) These articulated Ikarus-ZiU trolleys were in service by the 1990s, when they got replaced by more modern, although similar looking, Ikarus trolleys equipped with Ganz chopper-based electronics.

== Technical details ==
Scheme of ZiU-5 interior

ZiU-5 is a high-floor big class trolleybus for city mass transit. It's duraluminium hull mounted on the steel frame and carcass constructions. The hull has two doors in its front and rear ends. The doors open and close automatically by electric gear under driver's control. The vehicle is powered by DK-207A 95-kilowatt electric motor. The current regulation system (controller unit) is an automatic indirect one. All commutation of power-circuit resistors is performed by a low-voltage electric servomotor. These resistors limit the electric current through the main motor and, therefore, regulate its speed and torque. ZiU-5 is equipped with motor-generator for transformation of the input DC high voltage (550V) to low service DC voltage of 24V. This transformation is quite simple - 550V electric motor has coaxial connection with 24V electric generator. However, the drawback of this simplicity is a constant noise of this device. However good oilment and centring procedures can reduce this noise to tolerant level. The low voltage subsystem includes mentioned above controller unit, internal and external lights, door gear and two accumulator batteries. Due to differentiating voltage levels the hazard of electric shock to driver and passengers was reduced greatly. All electric devices inside passengers' saloon and driver cabin are supplied only with safe 24V voltage. Power 550V circuits are placed under the floor. The brake system includes electrodynamic, mechanical and pneumatic brakes. The pneumatic brake has the electric compressor unit to maintain the pressure in air reservoirs.

ZiU-5 has 38 passengers seats and is able to transport 122 persons with full load. The maximal speed is limited by 68 km/h, but some drivers were able to accelerate the vehicle up to 100 km/h without passengers.

== Technical data ==
- Length, mm : 11870
- Width, mm : 2680
- Height, mm : 3530
- Clearance, mm : 200
- Mass without load, t : 9.8
- Mass with moderate load, t : 14.6
- Maximal speed, km/h : 68
- Input voltage, V : 550

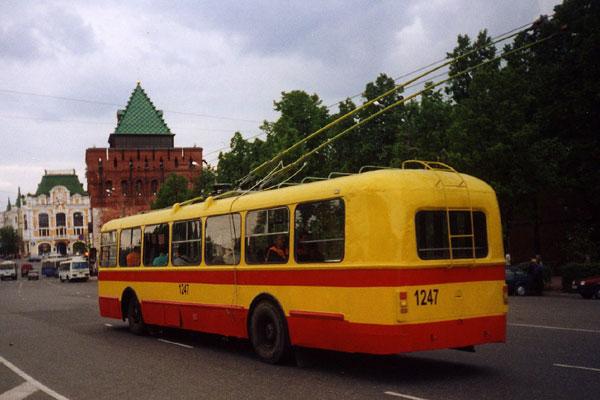
Museum ZiU-5 trolleybus in Nizhny Novgorod, Russia.

== Survivors ==
There are a few number of operable ZiU-5s today. None of them work on the city lines and became museum vehicles. Many of them were reconstructed from empty abandoned hulls. They are available for observation (and sometimes for hire for city excursions) in Saint Petersburg, Moscow, Minsk and Nizhny Novgorod. The group of city electric transport enthusiasts from many cities in Russia, with guests from Estonia and United States, hired the Nizhny Novgorod Museum ZiU-5 for their meeting in 2004 (see photo above).

In Budapest there is a completely restored and operational heritage Ziu5, number 573, and also an Ikarus 260 trolley with Ziu5 electronics, number 600.
