= Trolleybuses in Brest, Belarus =

Belarusian public transit system

Coordinates: 52°08′N 23°40′E

Brest trolleybus system
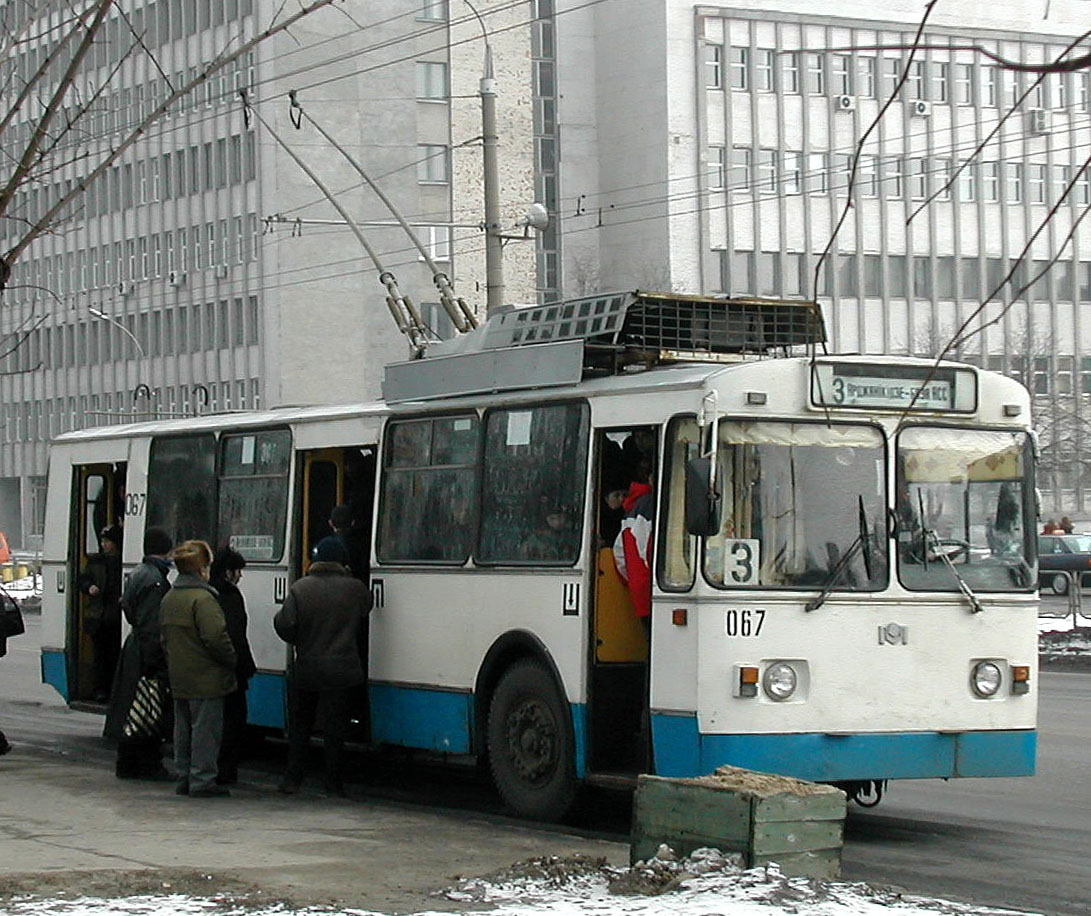
- A Belkommunmash AKSM-101 in Brest, 2003.

Operation
- Locale: Brest, Belarus
- Open: 1981
- Status: Open
- Routes: 8
- Operators: КУТП "Троллейбусный парк" (KUTP "Trolleybus Park")

Infrastructure
- Stock: 80

The Brest trolleybus system serves the city of Brest, on the western border of Belarus.

== History ==
Opened on 18 April 1981, the system had eight lines as at 2011.

== Lines ==
As at 2011, the system was made up of the following lines:

- 1 Ordzhonikidze (railway station) – Regional Hospital;
- 2 Sverdlov – SC "Victoria";
- 2a Ordzhonikidze – SC "Victoria";
- 3 Ordzhonikidze – SC "Victoria";
- 4 Ordzhonikidze – CSM;
- 5 "Tsvetotron" factory – Regional Hospital (via Yanka Kupala Street);
- 6 "Tsvetotron" factory – Regional Hospital (via Republic Avenue);
- 7 "Tsvetotron" factory – SK "Victoria";
- 8 Ordzhonikidze – "Tsvetotron" factory.

== Fleet ==
As at 2011, the Brest trolleybus fleet comprised 80 vehicles, most of them supplied by Belkommunmash, a Belarus-based tram and trolleybus manufacturer.

== Depot ==
The system has one depot.

== See also ==
- List of trolleybus systems
- Trolleybuses in Belarus
- Trolleybuses in former Soviet Union countries
