= Brusnika (company) =

Russian real estate developer

- Type: Private
- Industry: Construction
- Founded: 2004
- Headquarters: Russia, Yekaterinburg, Malysheva street, 51, office 37/05
- Key people: Alexander Stepanovich Shchigol (General Director); Alexey Nikolaevich Krukovsky (Chairman of the Board of Directors)
- Revenue: 115.5 bn rub (2025)
- Net income: 7.6 bn rub (МСФО 2025)
- Total assets: 175,600,000,000 Russian ruble (2023)
- Website: moskva.brusnika.ru

Brusnika (Russian: Брусника) is a Russian property development company. Established in 2004, it specialises in highrise housing. Headquartered in Yekaterinburg, its projects are located in Tyumen, Novosibirsk, Yekaterinburg, Chelyabinsk, Surgut, Vidny, Kurgan, Krasnoobsk, Omsk, Moscow, Saint Petersburg and Leningrad Oblast.

Since commencing operations, the company has completed and commissioned 3.5 million square metres of real estate. In 2025, the company's sales exceeded RUB 100 billion.

== History ==
The company began operations in 2004 in Tyumen under the name «Partner-Invest». It was part of the «Partner» holding company, which brought together businesses operating in construction, manufacturing and trade. In 2005, Partner-Invest began its property development activities. In 2006, the company launched the Third Zarechny Microdistrict project, a large-scale urban development project in Tyumen.

In 2009, Partner-Invest left the Partner holding company. In 2011, Brusnika acquired «Sibakademstroy», a company based in Novosibirsk.

In October 2015, the company underwent a rebranding, bringing together its divisions operating in five cities under the Brusnika name.

In June 2018 in collaboration with Sberbank, the company pioneered project financing with escrow accounts. The same year its national credit quality was evaluated as BBB+ (stable development forecast) according to Expert RA.

In 2019 Brusnika was reorganised as a corporate company with subsidiaries in Yekaterinburg, Novosibirsk, Tyumen, Surgut and Moscow. It was granted the national credit rating at BBB+(RU) (stable development forecast) by ACRA and was rated among the top five developers in Russia according to Forbes.

In 2020 the company issued its debut bonds on the Moscow Exchange, and was granted the status of a strategic developer in Russia and successfully retained its credit quality at BBB+. The same year, jointly with DOM.RF, the developer embarked on the first leased housing project in Yekaterinburg.

In 2021 ACRA promoted Brusnika's rating to A− (RU) with stable development forecast and rated its bonds at A− (RU). The company has launched mobile manufacturing to develop residential area "Pshenitsa" (Eng. Wheat), a new residential area in Novosibirsk and branched out into in-house production of aluminium-wooden windows in Yekaterinburg This year the urban villa in the European Quarter of Tyumen was awarded an International BREEAM Awards 2021 prize in the category of Accommodation – Buildings at the Stage of Design.

In this way in 2021 Brusnika issued two bonds on the Moscow Exchange for a total of 10 billion rubles. ACRA also rated all issues of the Brusnika's bonds at A− (RU).

In March 2022 ACRA confirmed the company's status and its bonds at А-(RU) with stable development forecast too.

In March 2023, Brusnika received an A− credit rating from ACRA and NKR. The rating forecast is stable.

In February 2024 NCR and ACRA confirmed Brusnika's credit rating as A-, with good viability prospects.

In the summer of 2024 Brusnika opened sales and started constructing Dom A, the first project in the centre of Moscow located in the Danilovsky district (Southern Administrative Okrug), near the Paveletskaya metro station. In August, the company presented the Puppet Theatre project in the centre of Surgut. Additionally, it unveiled the plan to construct a new school complete with a kindergarten in MONS, the quarter it is building in the Butyrsky district of Moscow.

In June 2024 Brusnika signed three strategic agreements. The first to form a joint venture with Gazprombank-Invest, enabling the company to accomplish projects in the new area of St Petersburg and Leningrad region, including integrated territorial development. The second agreement is with VTB to finance construction exceeding one million square metres in aggregate area for sale. The third agreement with Sberbank is to foster long-term cooperation on new ways of financing modern social and educational structures.

By the end of 2024 the company will have completed a public stadium and the largest district school in the framework of the First Quarter Estate project, Moscow region.

Scala, the European Riverbank parking complex, earned the gold medal of the 2023 Russian Academy of Architecture and Construction Sciences.

In May 2024 Scala received an honourable mention in the Architizer A+ Awards, an international architecture awards program. The River Port masterplan entered the shortlist for a reputable 2024 Italian Plan Award. Brusnika's HQ in Yekaterinburg took first place in the Comfort and Ergonomics category of the 2024 Best Office Awards.
