= Trolleybuses in Yerevan =

Public transport system in Yerevan, Armenia

Yerevan trolleybus system

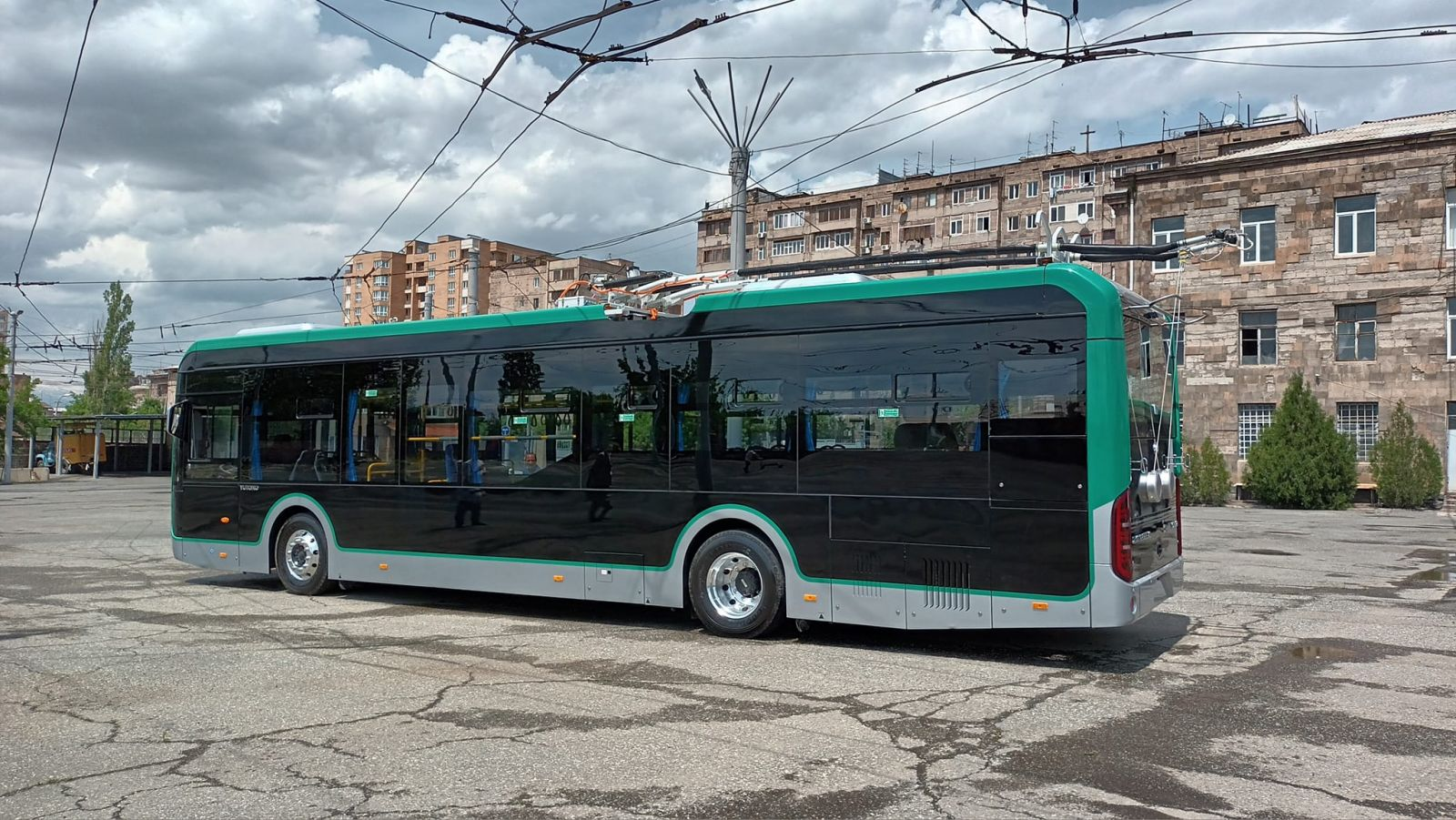
- A new trolleybus in Yerevan, 2023.

Operation
- Locale: Yerevan, Armenia
- Open: 1949
- Status: Open
- Routes: 5
- Owner: Yerevan Municipality
- Operator: Yerevan electrotransport

Infrastructure
- Depot: 2

Statistics
- 2019: 174,000 annual passengers

The Yerevan trolleybus system (Armenian: Երևանի տրոլեյբուսային համակարգեր) forms part of the public transport network in Yerevan, the capital city of Armenia. Since the closure of the Gyumri trolleybus system in 2005, it has been Armenia’s only trolleybus system.

== History ==
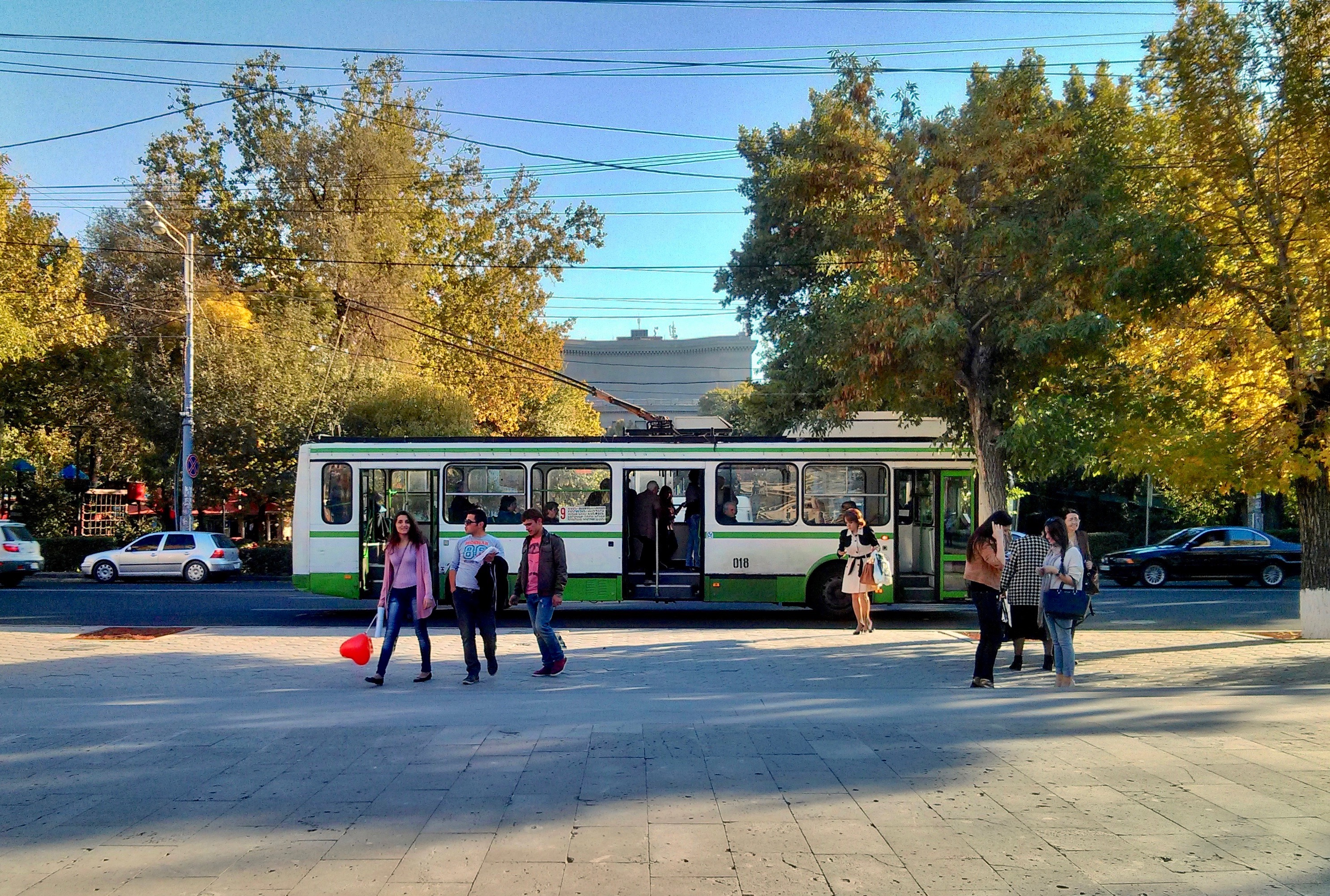
An old trolleybus in downtown Yerevan, 2013

Opened on 16 August 1949, the system was once much more extensive than it is today. At its greatest extent, the system had 20 lines, operated by a total of 300 trolleybuses, the vast majority of which were either Czech made Škoda 9Tr or 14Tr units, or Soviet made ZiU-682 models.

In recent years, the system has shrunk, and most of the Soviet era trolleybuses have been replaced by newer vehicles.

== Lines and routes ==
As of December 2024, the Yerevan trolleybus network consists of 5 routes:

Nr 1 Garegin Nzhdeh Square - Dzhrvezh;
Nr 2 City station of aeration - Nubarashen road;
Nr 9 Circus - Avan;
Nr 10 Nor Nork (Mikoyan street, 15) - Davtashen (4th block);
Nr 15 Erebuni airport - Block 15.

In July 2023, two new lines were introduced as new trolleybuses arrived to the fleet. Lines 2A and 10A were extended versions of lines 2 and 10, the lines continue without wires which was made possible with the new buses. In December 2024, routes 2A and 10A were closed, and routes 2 and 10 were extended.

== Fleet ==
The Yerevan trolleybus fleet mostly consists of new Chinese trolleybuses Yutong ZK6128BEVG (15 vehicles) and Zhongtong LCK6126E (15 vehicles). There are also more than 30 Russian-made trolleybuses LiAZ-5280 in the fleet. A significant number of Škoda 14Tr vehicles were replaced by 30 new Chinese trolleybuses in December 2024.

The second hand Berliet ER100 trolleybuses originally used on the Lyon trolleybus system ended in 2023.

Older trolleybus models such as the Škoda 9Tr and ZiU-682 have all been withdrawn from operation and decommissioned.

In 2019, it was announced that daily ridership of the system was 14,500. Former deputy Mayor of Yerevan, Hrachya Sargsyan, stated that 101 new trolleybuses for new routes is planned. In 2023, 15 new Yutong trolleybuses joined the system and there are plans to buy an additional 15 new units.

== Accident ==
On 16 September 1976, a trolleybus operating alongside Yerevan Lake went out of control and fell from the dam wall into the lake. The sound of this accident was heard by Shavarsh Karapetyan, a multi-champion finswimmer, who was training with his brother Kamo, also a finswimmer, by running alongside the lake. The trolleybus lay at the bottom of the reservoir some 25 meters (80 ft) off the shore at a depth of 10 meters (33 ft). Karapetyan swam to it and, under conditions of almost zero visibility due to the silt rising from the bottom, broke the back window with his legs. The trolleybus was crowded, it carried 92 passengers and Karapetyan knew he had little time, spending some 30 to 35 seconds for each person he saved. Karapetyan managed to rescue 20 people, but the combined effect of cold water and the multiple wounds he received left him lying unconscious for 45 days, with subsequent sepsis (due to the presence of raw sewage in the lake water) and lung complications.

== See also ==
- List of trolleybus systems
- Transport in Armenia
- Trolleybuses in former Soviet Union countries
- Trolleybus usage by country
- Yerevan Metro
