= Medal "For the Salvation of the Drowning" =

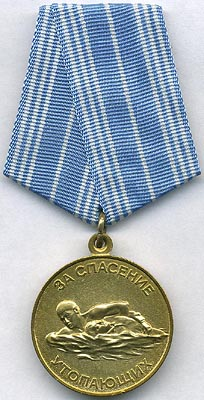
- Medal "For the Salvation of the Drowning" (obverse)
- Type: Bravery award
- Awarded for: Courage and resourcefulness in water rescue
- Presented by: USSR
- Eligibility: Citizens of any nationality
- Status: No longer awarded
- Established: February 16, 1957
- Final award: May 20, 1991

Highlights
- Total: ~24,000
- Ribbon of the Medal "For the Salvation of the Drowning"

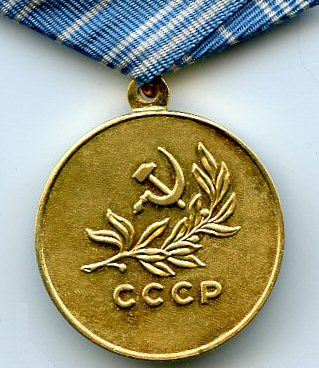
Reverse of the Medal "For the Salvation of the Drowning"

The Medal "For the Salvation of the Drowning" (Russian: Медаль «За спасение утопающих») was a state decoration of the Soviet Union awarded to citizens of any nationality for courage and resourcefulness in rescuing people from drowning. It was established on February 16, 1957, by decree of the Presidium of the Supreme Soviet of the USSR. Its statute was twice amended by further decrees of the Presidium of the Supreme Soviet of the USSR, first on August 1, 1967 and lastly on July 18, 1980. The medal ceased to be awarded following the December 1991 dissolution of the Soviet Union; an interim design with "Russia" replacing the "USSR" on the reverse was awarded a few times until it was replaced in 1994 by the Russian Federation's Medal "For Life Saving".

== Medal statute ==
The Medal "For the Salvation of the Drowning" was awarded to rescue personnel and other citizens of the USSR, as well as to persons who were not citizens of the USSR, for courage, bravery and selflessness displayed during the rescue of people in the water, for a high degree of vigilance and resourcefulness resulting in the prompt alert and direction of rescue services to the scenes of accidents and emergencies in the water, as well as for the exemplary organization of rescue services in the water.

The Medal "For the Salvation of the Drowning" was awarded on behalf of the Presidium of the Supreme Soviet of the USSR or Presidium of the Supreme Soviet of the Union or of autonomous republics by chairmen, deputy chairmen or members of the Presidium of the Supreme Soviets of union or autonomous republics, the chairmen, deputy chairmen and members of the executive committees of regional, provincial, district and city councils of deputies in the community of the recipient.

Each medal came with an attestation of award, this attestation came in the form of a small 8 cm by 11 cm cardboard booklet bearing the award's name, the recipient's particulars and an official stamp and signature on the inside.

The Medal "For the Salvation of the Drowning" was worn on the left side of the chest and when in the presence of other medals of the USSR, it was located immediately after the Medal "For Courage in a Fire". If worn in the presence or awards of the Russian Federation, the latter have precedence.

Posthumous awards of the Medal "For the Salvation of the Drowning", or medals awarded to recipients since dead, were to be retained, along with the attestation of award booklet, by the family as a souvenir.

== Medal description ==
The Medal "For the Salvation of the Drowning" was a 32 mm in diameter circular oxydised brass medal with raised rims on both sides. On the obverse at center, the relief image breaking the surface of the water of a rescue swimmer pulling a drowning victim to safety, along the upper circumference, the relief inscription "For the Salvation" (Russian: «За спасение»), along the lower circumference, the relief inscription "of the Drowning" (Russian: «утопающих»). On the reverse at center, the relief image of a laurel branch from bottom left to upper right, above it, the relief image of the hammer and sickle, below the branch, the inscription "USSR" (Russian: «СССР»).

The medal was secured to a standard Soviet pentagonal mount by a ring through the medal suspension loop. The mount was covered by a 24 mm wide blue silk moiré ribbon with a 1 mm wide central white stripe and three 1 mm wide white stripes separated by 1 mm starting 1,5 mm from both edges.

== Recipients (partial list) ==
The individuals listed below were recipients of the Medal "For the Salvation of the Drowning".

- Agniya Lvovna Barto, Poet and author of children's books
- Shavarsh Karapetyan
- Andrei Anatol'evich Kozitsyn
- Gennady Arkhipovich Aïdaev
- Major General Aleksander Anatol'evich Dorofeev
- Aleksander Sergeevich Zapesotsky
- Captain 1st grade Georgy Matveevich Agafonov
- Major General Viktor Viktorovich Saf'yanov

== See also ==
- Awards and decorations of the Soviet Union
- Awards and decorations of the Russian Federation
