= Trolleybuses in Urgench =

Transit system in Uzbekistan

Coordinates: 41°33′N 60°38′E

Urgench trolleybus system
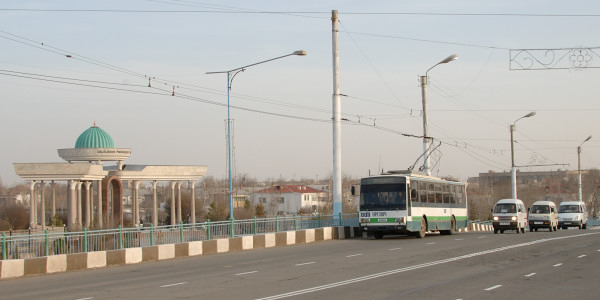
- A Škoda 14TrM 008 in Urgench, 2010.

Operation
- Locale: Urgench, Uzbekistan
- Open: 1997
- Status: Open
- Routes: 1

Infrastructure
- Depot: 1 (Urganch)
- Stock: 9x Škoda 24Tr Irisbus nos 010 to 018 (8x on duty daily, 1x on service/reserve)

Statistics
- Route length: 31.3 km
Overview
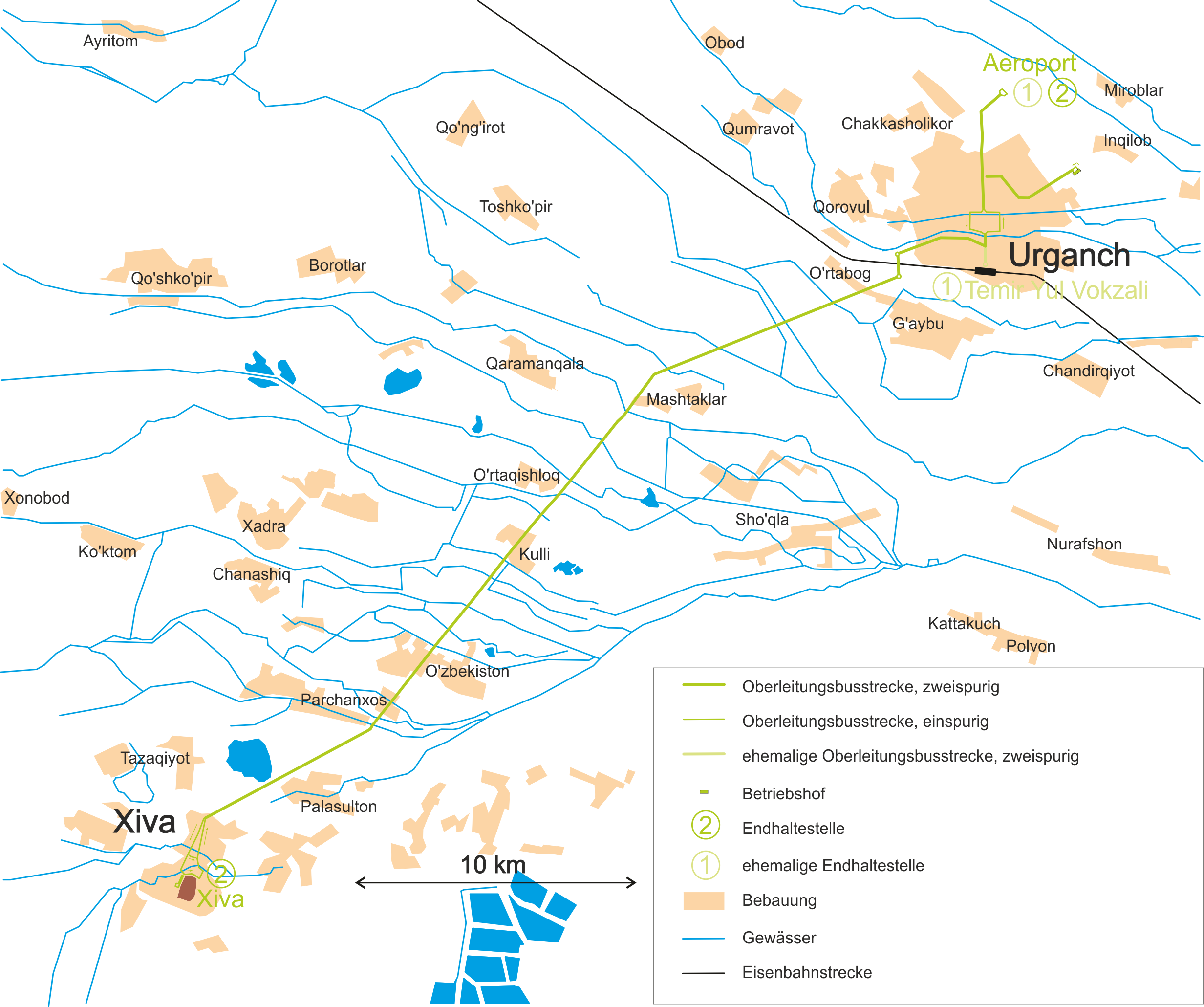

The Urgench trolleybus system links Urgench, the capital city of Xorazm Region in western Uzbekistan, with the neighbouring city of Khiva. Since the closure of the Tashkent trolleybus system in 2010, it has been Uzbekistan's only trolleybus system.

The cross country line is 31.3 km (19.4 mi) long; a further urban line in Urgench has been abandoned.

== History ==
On 20 October 1997, urban trolleybuses came to Urgench, with the inauguration of line 1 between Aeroport (Urgench Airport) and Temir Yul Vokzali (railway station). Urgench thereby became the last city in Uzbekistan in which a trolleybus system was opened. In 1998 came the overland line 2 to Khiva, near the border with Turkmenistan, to complete the expansion of the trolleybus system.

As early as 2002, the urban line 1 was closed. Since then, only the overland line 2 has remained.

On 26 October 2009, the Government of Uzbekistan decided to close the remaining trolleybus systems in Jizzakh and Namangan at the end of 2009, and in the capital Tashkent during 2010. The Urgench system was the only one not slated for closure; instead of that, nine new trolleybuses were to be procured.

Since then, a short extension section in Khiva, including a link to a depot, has been under construction, with commissioning scheduled for summer 2010.

== Lines ==
The short section of the overhead wire from the city center to the railway station (Temir Yul Vokzali), previously served only by line 1 and section to the Urgench International Airport, have been dismantled.

Former Line 2 essentially follows the course of the Urgench–Khiva road, it is the only line nowadays. In the city centers of Urgench and Khiva, the route followed by this line is determined by one-way streets.

The Khiva terminus is on the northern edge of the Itchan Kala fortress (now a World Heritage Site), east of its north gate. West of the fortress is another, unused, short section of overhead wire, with a loop at the west gate. This section is not connected by switches with the regularly used section, but can be used to short cut the regular round trip.

Another, not yet operational section (not shown on the map), branches off immediately after the Khiva terminus, but is not yet connected with the rest of the system.

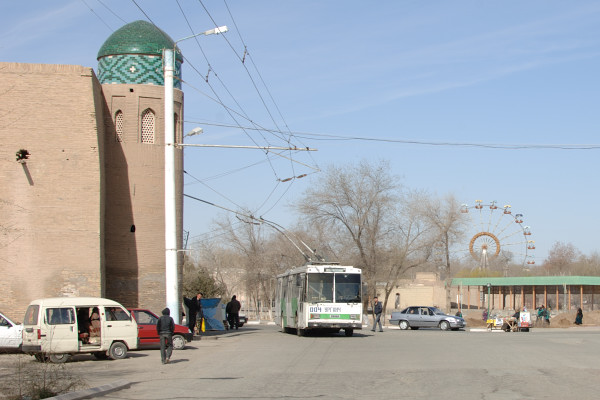
Škoda 14Tr 004 in Khiva (2010).

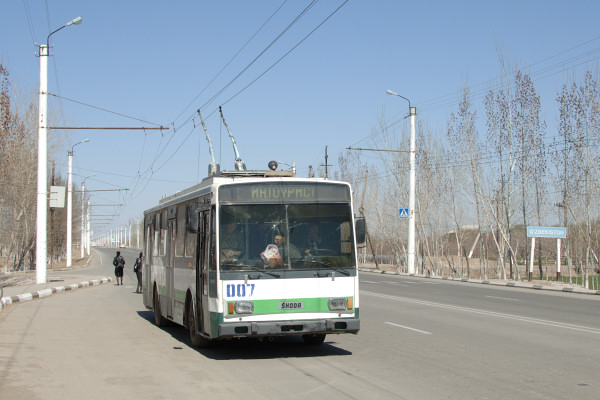
Škoda 14TrM 007 in Oʻzbekiston (2010).

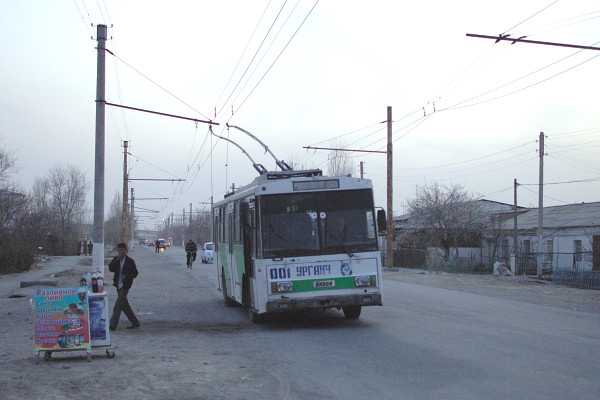
Škoda 14Tr 001 in Urgench on the line to the depot (2010).

== Fleet ==
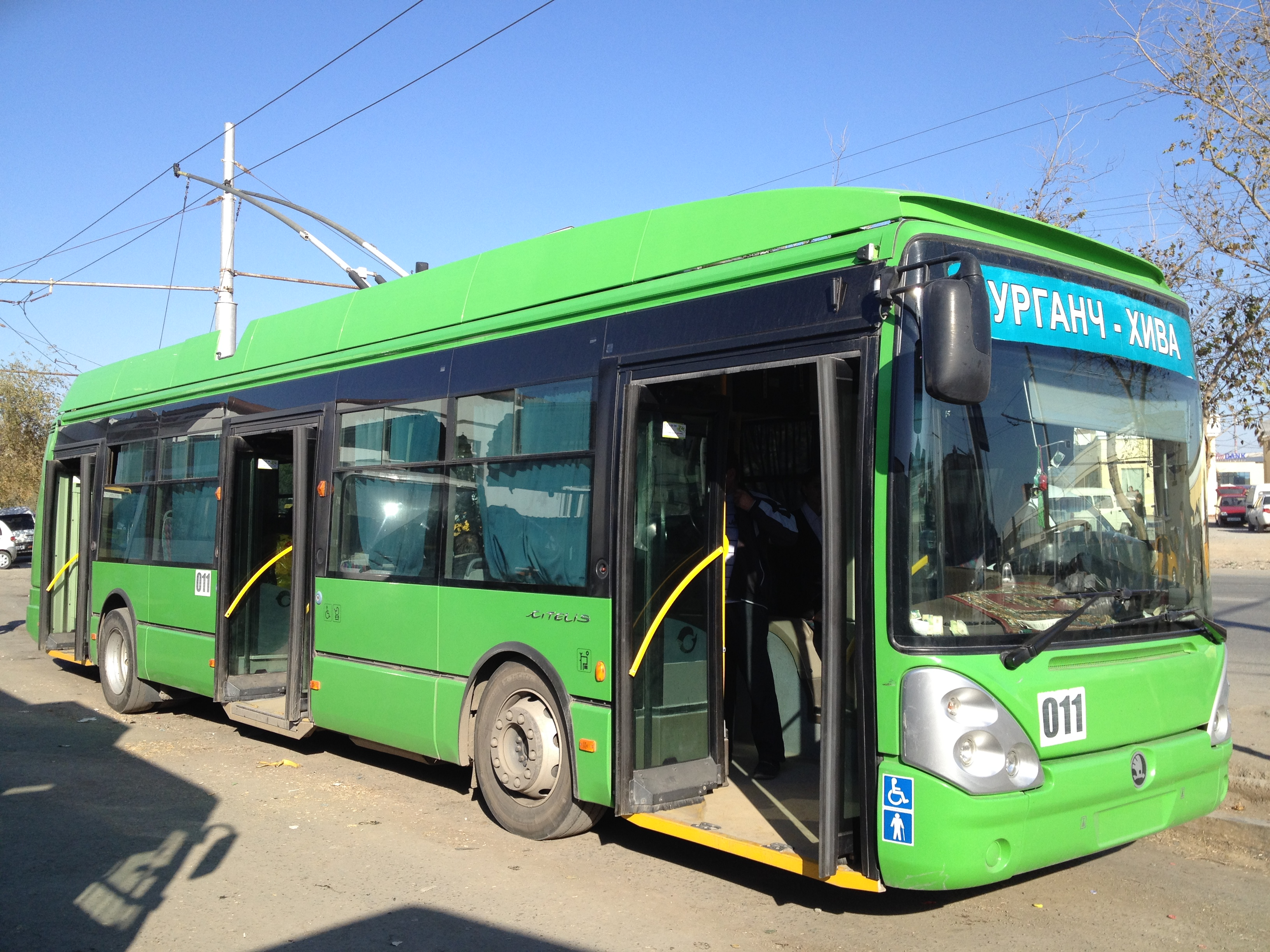
Škoda 24Tr Irisbus trolleybus in Urgench, 2015

For the opening of the system in 1997, Škoda delivered six 14Tr trolleybuses with the numbers 001 to 006, and three more modern 14TrM trolleybuses numbered 007 to 009. They had been manufactured in the Škoda factory in Ostrov nad Ohri in the Czech Republic.

The primary external difference between the 14Trs and the 14TrMs is the matrix display on the latter model's front. In Urgench, this display is not used to show destinations.

As of 2010, all nine vehicles were still in service. but as of 2023 all of them withdrawn and 5 chassis' remains are stored at the depot.

In 2013, 9 new Škoda 24Tr Irisbus trolleybuses entered service.

== Depot ==
The system's depot is in Urgench. It is connected with the operating lines by a service line approximately 3 km (1.9 mi) long. However, there are no switches between the service line and the operating lines.

== Ride cost (as of December 2023) ==
- 2000 Som within a city boundaries
- 3000 Som to a suburban area
- 4000 Som between the cities

== Operating hours ==
6.45 - 18.45 Daily

== See also ==
- List of trolleybus systems
- Trolleybuses in former Soviet Union countries
