= Trolleybuses in Belarus =

Trolleybuses in Belarus form an important component of the urban public transport systems in that country.

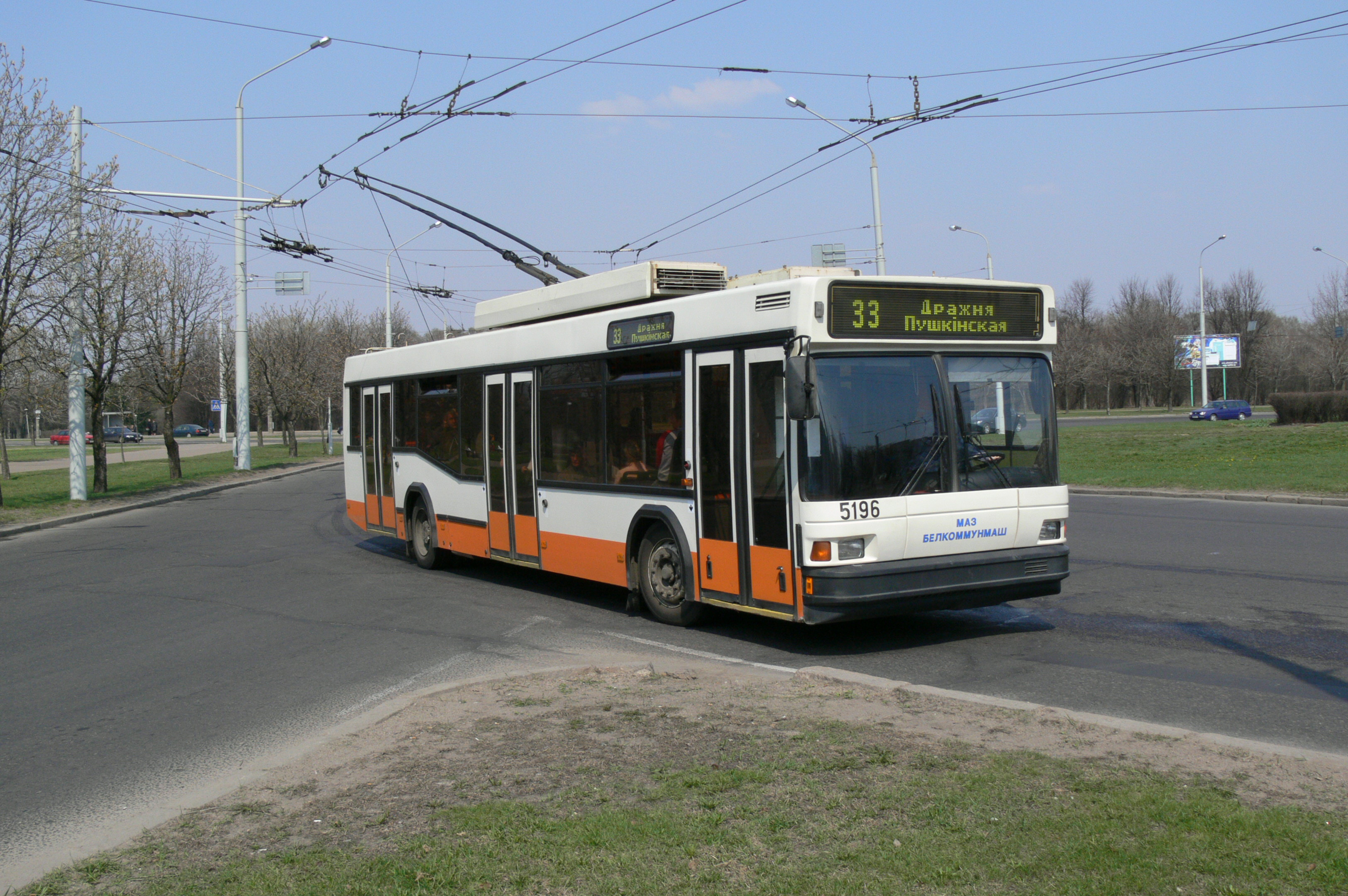
MAZ-103t trolleybus in Minsk

Trolleybus systems currently exist in seven cities in Belarus. The system in Minsk, in operation since 1952, was the largest trolleybus system in the world as of 2000. As of about 2005, the Minsk system had a fleet of slightly more than 1,000 trolleybuses, serving 68 routes. As of 2026, the fleet comprised slightly more than 750 trolleybuses, serving more than 60 routes. About one half of Minsk trolleybuses are based on IMC technology.

Trolleybuses also serve Brest, Vitebsk, Gomel, Grodno, Mogilev and Babruysk (since 1978).

For a complete list of all trolleybus systems to have existed in Belarus, with dates of opening (and city name transliterations), see List of trolleybus systems, under Belarus. As of March 2026, all seven trolleybus systems opened in Belarus remain in operation.

Belarus also has some manufacturers of trolleybuses, including Belkommunmash (BKM Holding) and MAZ.

== See also ==
- Trolleybuses in former Soviet Union countries
- List of trolleybus systems in Russia
- List of trolleybus systems in Ukraine
