= Agniya Barto =

Soviet poet and writer

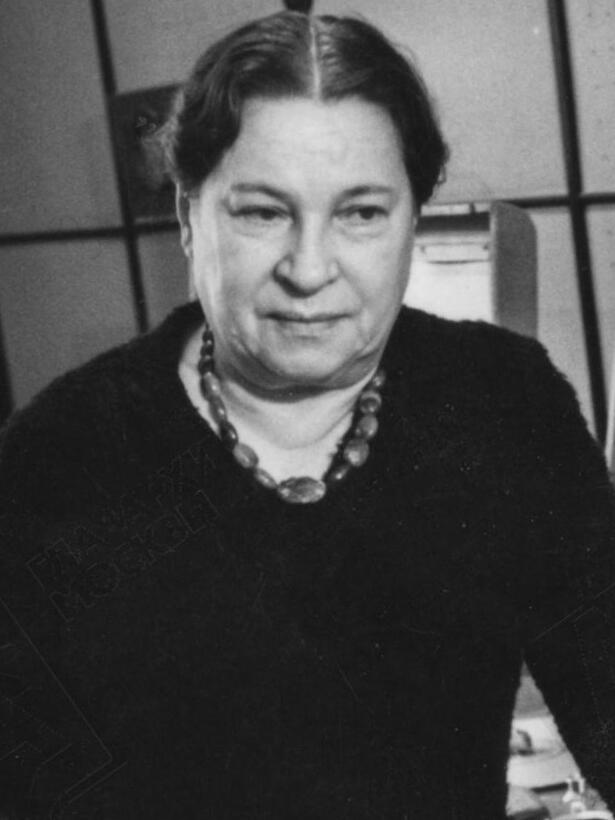
- Barto in 1969
- Born: Gitel Leybovna Volova; 17 February [O.S. 4 February] 1901; Moscow, Russian Empire
- Died: 1 April 1981 (aged 80); Moscow, Soviet Union
- Resting place: Novodevichy Cemetery
- Occupations: Writer, screenwriter, radio narrator
- Writing career
- Genres: Poetry, Screenplay

Agniya Lvovna Barto (Russian: А́гния Льво́вна Барто́, IPA: [ˈaɡnʲɪjə ˈlʲvovnə bɐrˈto]; 17 February [O.S. 4 February] 1901 – 1 April 1981) was a Russian Soviet poet and children's writer of Belarusian Jewish origin.

== Early life and education ==
Agniya was born Gitel Leybovna Volova in Moscow to a Belarusian Jewish family. Her father, Lev Nikolayevich Volov, was a veterinarian from Šiauliai, and her mother, Maria (née Blokh), was from Kaunas, Lithuania. Her mother's brother was Grigory Blokh, a famous otolaryngologist and phthisiologist. Agniya studied at a ballet school. She liked poetry and soon started to write her own, trying to imitate Anna Akhmatova and Vladimir Mayakovsky. She read her poetry at the graduation ceremony from the ballet school. Among the guests was the Minister of Education Anatoly Lunacharsky who remarked that instead of becoming a ballerina she should be a professional poet. According to legend, despite the fact that all of Barto's poetry at that time was about love and revolution, Lunacharsky predicted that she would become a famous children's poet.

== Career ==
Agniya married ornithologist and poet Pavel Barto, grandson of an English-born merchant Richard Barto. Some of her children's poems were published under two names: Agniya Barto and Pavel Barto. In 1925 she published her first books: Chinese boy Wang-Li (Китайчонок Ван-Ли) and Mishka the Petty Thief (Мишка-Воришка). Subsequently, she published The First of May (Первое мая), 1926 and Brothers (Братишки), 1928 which received a positive review from Korney Chukovsky. After publishing a book of poetic miniatures for toddlers entitled Toys (Игрушки) in 1936, she suddenly became one of the most popular children's authors, with millions of published copies.

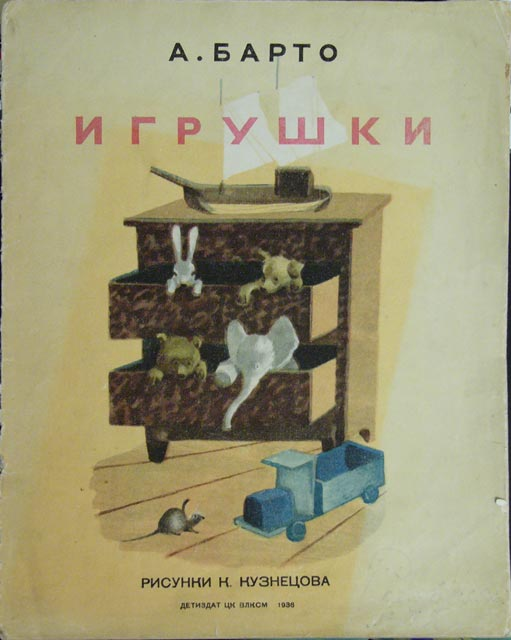
Book cover of Toys, 1936.

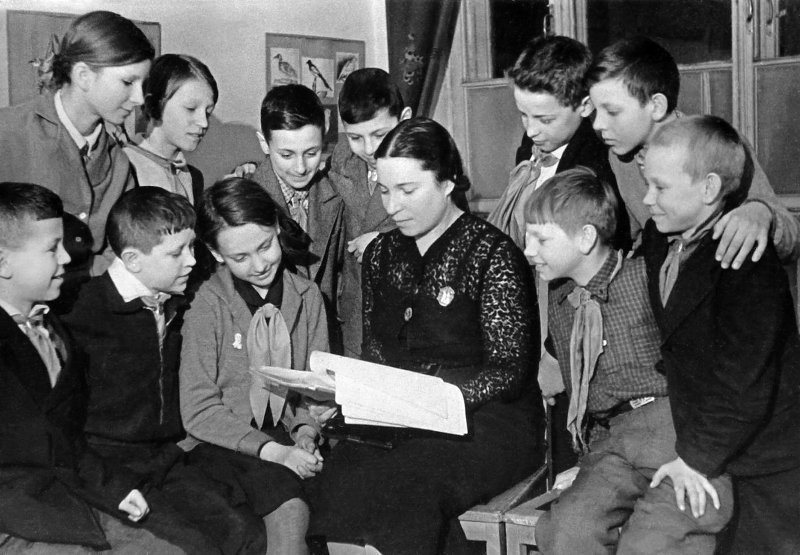
Barto with children, 1940

During World War II, she wrote patriotic anti-Nazi poetry, often directly addressed to the leader of the Soviet Union, Joseph Stalin. She also worked as a Western Front correspondent for the newspaper Komsomolskaya Pravda. In 1949, she was awarded the Stalin Prize for her book Poetry for Children.

During the 1960s, Barto worked in an orphanage that inspired her to write the poem Zvenigorod (Звенигород, written in 1947, first published in 1966). For nine years, Barto was the anchor of the radio program Find a Person (Найти человека), which helped people find family members lost during World War II. During that time she helped to reunite no fewer than a thousand families. She wrote a book about it in 1966. In 1977, she published Translations from the Children's Language (Переводы с детского) composed of her translations of poetry written by children of different countries.

She was the author of the script for the children's films Foundling (Подкидыш, 1940), An Elephant and a Rope (Слон и верёвочка) 1945, Alyosha Ptitsyn builds his character (Алёша Птицын вырабатывает характер), 1953, 10,000 Boys (10 000 мальчиков), 1962, Find a Person (Найти человека), 1973.

== Personal life ==
She lived at the House of Writers in Moscow. She died in Moscow in 1981 and buried at the Novodevichy Cemetery.

== Awards and honours ==
- Order of Lenin
- Order of the October Revolution
- Two Orders of the Red Banner of Labour
- Order of the Badge of Honour
- Medal "For the Salvation of the Drowning"
- Order of the Smile (Poland)
- 1950: Stalin Prize of second degree
- 1972: Lenin Prize
- Medal "For Valiant Labour in the Great Patriotic War 1941–1945"
- Medal "In Commemoration of the 800th Anniversary of Moscow"
- Miner's Glory Medal
- 1976: Hans Christian Andersen Award.
- Barto crater on Venus was named after her in 1985.
- A minor planet 2279 Barto discovered in 1968 by Soviet astronomer Lyudmila Chernykh was also named in her honor.
