= Trolleybuses in former Soviet Union countries =

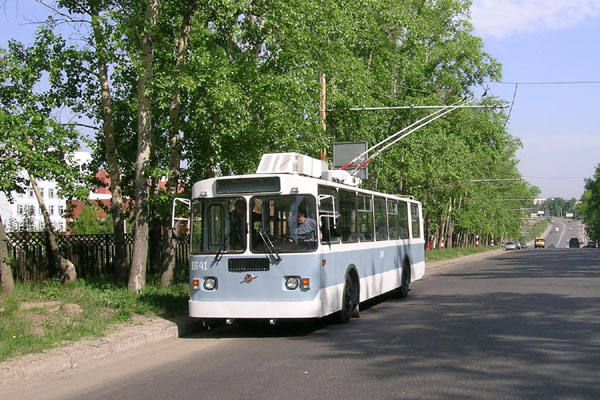
ZiU-9G trolleybus in Nizhny Novgorod, Russia

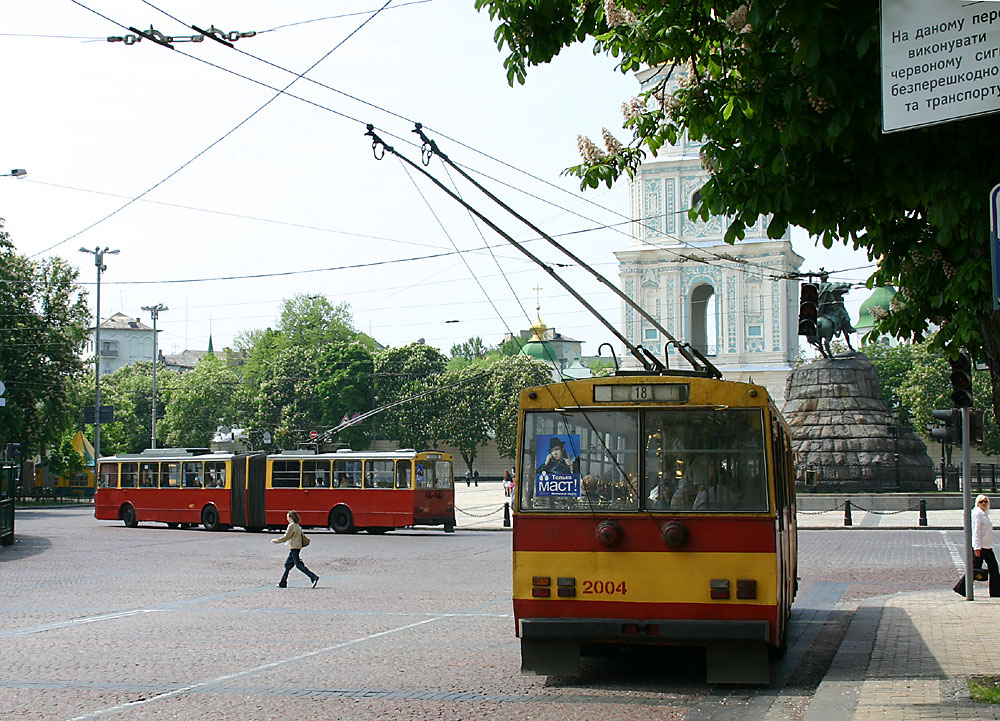
Two Škoda trolleybuses in Kyiv, Ukraine, with the St. Sophia complex in the background.

The first trolleybus vehicle in Russia was built in Saint Petersburg in 1902 at Frese machine-building factory. It utilised a carriage-type current collector like the early von Siemens prototypes. There was no attempt to organize passenger or cargo services at this time.

The first operational trolleybus service was introduced in 1933 in Moscow. In Soviet cities with underground metropolitan railways, trolleybus systems were intended to replace tramcars. In reality such plans were partially performed in the 1950s rather than in the 1930s. The first Soviet-made passenger trolleybus LK-1 was named after Politburo member Lazar Kaganovich. It was a dangerous and unreliable vehicle, quickly replaced by more advanced YaTB vehicles. These cars, both passenger and cargo, were the mainstay of the Soviet trolley fleet before the World War II. At this time new trolleybus systems were opened in Leningrad, Kyiv, and a few other major Soviet cities.

During World War II, new trolleybus systems were opened in the Soviet Union. The need for mass transit in cities away from the front was urgent, but construction of tram lines was too expensive and time-consuming. Buses were largely mobilised to the Red Army as staff and medical vehicles. The remains of the bus fleet quickly stalled due to fuel shortages. The trolleybuses proved a good solution. Some vehicles, wires and other equipment were evacuated from Moscow in 1941; these materials were used for erecting new lines and systems in other cities. In the front-line city of Leningrad, trolleybus service ceased operations in November 1941 and was not restored until the end of the war. City trams were relaunched in April 1942 and performed without interruption under siege conditions. This restored Soviet plans of mass transit development in the form of co-existence of subways, trams, and trolleys.

The postwar period saw an explosion of development and expansion of trolleybus systems in the Soviet Union. Many cities and towns introduced passenger and cargo trolleybus services, sometimes interfering with tram operations. One of the most notable of these new trolleybus systems was the Crimean Trolleybus, currently the world's longest trolleybus line. Production at the time was limited to the monopoly Zavod imeni Uritskogo (ZiU, named after Moisei Uritsky). It produced thousands of MTB-82, ZiU-5, and ZiU-9 passenger trolleybuses for domestic purposes and for export. ZiU-5s and ZiU-9s were sold to Greece, Colombia, Argentina and Eastern Bloc countries. Three ZiU-9 cars were on loan in 1973 for testing purposes in Helsinki, Finland.

The collapse of the Soviet Union led to insufficient funding for many municipal trolleybus systems, but they proved more resilient than municipal tram or bus operations. Within the area of modern Russia, there are two closed trolleybus systems, in Shakhty (whose operations ceased in October 2007) and Moscow on 26 August 2020. The suspended trolleybus operations from October 2006 in Arkhangelsk were reactivated in December 2007. The trolleybus system in Grozny was completely destroyed in the First Chechen War; reconstruction is in planning. There is also one system with uncertain futures, in Voronezh. In other cities the development of trolleybus passenger services continues. Two new systems were introduced in Moscow suburbs Khimki and Vidnoe in the second half of the 1990s. ZiU, now named Trolza, has lost its monopoly in producing trolley vehicles. Today a number of domestic factories offer trolleybuses for the Russian market.

== See also ==
- List of trolleybus systems
- List of trolleybus systems in Russia
- List of trolleybus systems in Ukraine
- Trolleybuses in Belarus
- Trolleybuses in Yerevan (Armenia)
- Trolleybuses in Urgench (Uzbekistan)
- Trolleybus usage by country

== Books ==
- Murray, Alan (2000). World Trolleybus Encyclopaedia. Reading, Berkshire, UK: Trolleybooks. ISBN 0-904235-18-1.
- Straßenbahnatlas ehem. Sowjetunion / Tramway Atlas of the former USSR (1996). Berlin: Arbeitsgemeinschaft Blickpunkt Straßenbahn, in conjunction with Light Rail Transit Association, London. ISBN 3-926524-15-4.
- Tarkhov, Sergei (2000). Empire of the Trolleybus: Vol 1 - Russia. London: Rapid Transit Publications. ISBN 0-948619-02-3.
