= Shavarsh Karapetyan =

Armenian finswimmer (born 1953)

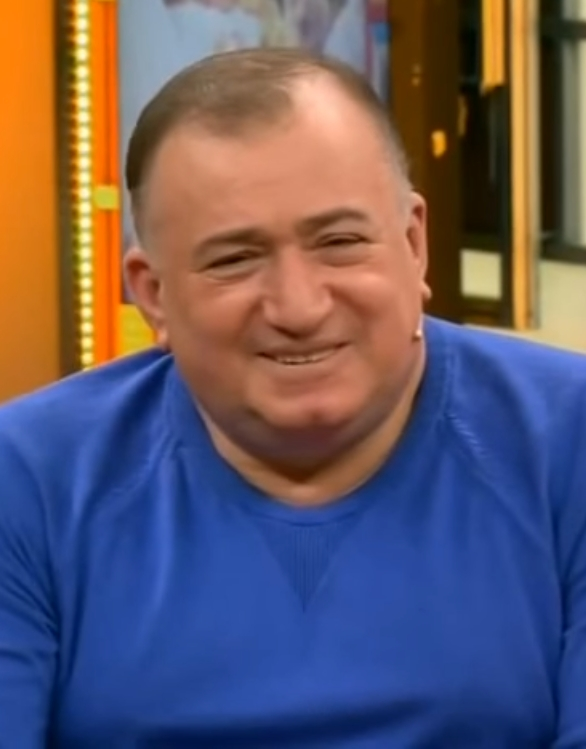
- Karapetyan in 2014

Personal information
- Nationality: Armenian
- Born: 19 May 1953 (age 72) Kirovakan, Armenian SSR, Soviet Union

Sport
- Country: Soviet Union
- Sport: Finswimming

Shavarsh Vladimiri (Vladimirovich) Karapetyan (Armenian: Շավարշ Կարապետյան; born 19 May 1953) is a Soviet-Armenian former finswimmer. He was best known for saving the lives of 20 people in a 1976 incident in Yerevan.

== Biography ==
Karapetyan was born on 19 May 1953, in Soviet Armenia's third largest city, Kirovakan, (now called Vanadzor again). His family moved to Yerevan in 1964, where Shavarsh finished eight years of school and then attended a technical school for auto-mechanics. On the advice of family friends, he started to learn swimming at a young age. He later switched to finswimming. In 1975–1976, Karapetyan served in a Soviet Air Defence Forces base in the Baku military district.

== 1974 bus incident ==
In 1974 Shavarsh was riding a bus when the driver pulled over to check on a mechanical problem. The engine was left running and the bus suddenly started rolling down towards a mountain gorge. Karapetyan broke down the partition separating the passengers from the driver's compartment, then took control of the steering wheel and turned the bus away from the cliff.

== 1976 trolleybus incident ==
On 16 September 1976, Karapetyan was jogging alongside Yerevan Lake with his brother Kamo. Karapetyan had just completed his usual finswimming distance of 20 km (12 mi) when he heard the sound of a crash and saw a sinking trolleybus.

The trolleybus had lost control and fallen from a dam wall, lying at the bottom of the reservoir some 25 meters (80 ft) offshore at a depth of 10 meters (33 ft). Despite the challenging conditions of sewage-infested waters and poor visibility due to silt, Karapetyan dove in and used his legs to kick open the back window of the trolleybus. He managed to rescue 46 out of the 92 passengers onboard, saving the lives of 20 individuals. In total he dove 20 times, each dive lasting about 25 seconds, and pulled out a total of 37 people. 9 others escaped on their own through the window he broke. Only 20 of the 46 survived, despite medical attention at the scene.

The combined effect of multiple lacerations from glass shards led to Karapetyan's hospitalization for 45 days, as he developed pneumonia and sepsis. Subsequent lung complications prevented Karapetyan from continuing his sports career. He did, however, insist on one last meet despite his damaged lungs, and managed to set a new world record despite the pain.

Karapetyan's achievement was not immediately recognized, since Soviet censorship usually suppressed any news about disasters in the USSR. All related photos were kept at the district attorney's office and were only published two years later. He was awarded the Medal "For the Salvation of the Drowning" and the Order of the Badge of Honor. He became a household name in the USSR when Komsomolskaya Pravda published the article on his feat, entitled "The Underwater Battle of the Champion", on 12 October 1982. This publication revealed that he was the rescuer; and many demanded that Hero of the Soviet Union award should be given to him. However, this did not happen.

== Swimming career ==
During his career, Karapetyan became a Merited Master of Sports of the USSR and an eleven-time world record-breaker in finswimming. He acquired 7 Soviet championships, 13 European championships, and 17 world championships for a total of 37 gold medals by the time he retired at the age of 24.

In 1982, Karapetyan was awarded a UNESCO "Fair Play" letter of congratulations.

He has also coached his son Tigran and headed the Shavarsh Karapetyan Foundation to support young swimmers.

== 1985 burning building incident ==
On 15 February 1985, Karapetyan was near the Karen Demirchyan Complex when a fire broke out, trapping people inside. He came to the aid of firefighters and participated in the rescue of multiple people. Once again, he was badly hurt with severe burns and spent a long time in the hospital.

== Later life ==
The main belt asteroid 3027 Shavarsh, discovered by Nikolai Chernykh in 1978 at the Crimean Astrophysical Observatory, was named after him (and approved by the MPC in September 1986).

Karapetyan moved to Moscow where he founded a shoe company called "Second Breath". He regularly visits Armenia and the Nagorno-Karabakh.

Karapetyan took part in the 2014 Winter Olympics torch relay for the second stage of the run. He was passed the torch in Moscow and carried it towards Krasnogorsk. The next day, Karapetyan carried the torch for a second time. He stated in an interview, "I was carrying the torch for Russia and for Armenia."

== See also ==
- Trolleybuses in Yerevan § Accident
