= Yerevan Lake =

Artificial reservoir in Yerevan, Armenia

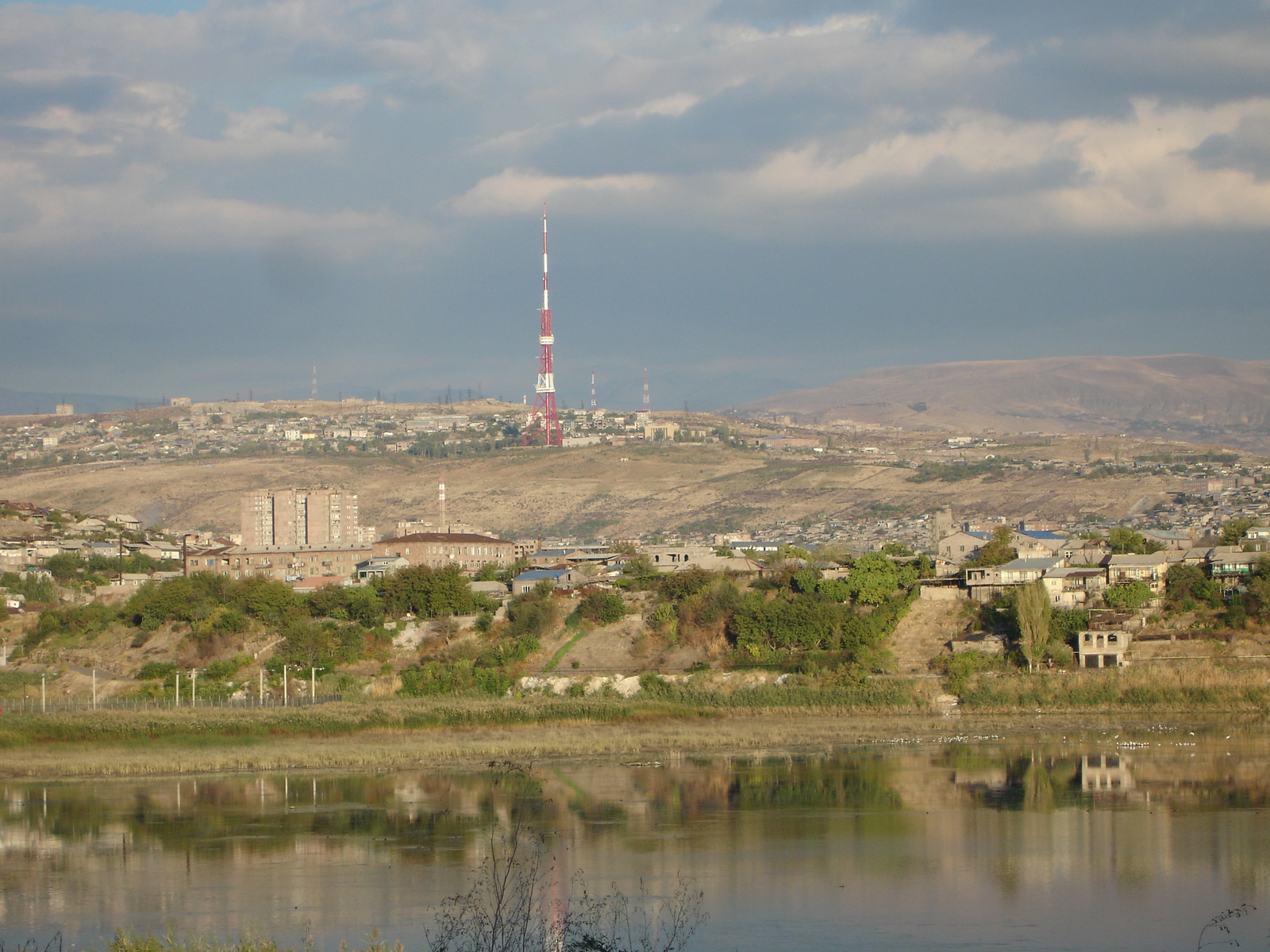
- Yerevan Lake

- Location within Armenia Location within Caucasus Mountains
- Interactive map of Yerevan Lake
- Location: Yerevan
- Coordinates: 40°9′35.04″N 44°28′36.54″E
- Basin countries: Armenia
- Max. width: 5 km (3.1 mi)
- Surface area: 0.65 km^{2} (0.25 sq mi)
- Max. depth: 18 m (59 ft)
- Surface elevation: 908 m (2,979 ft)
- Settlements: Yerevan

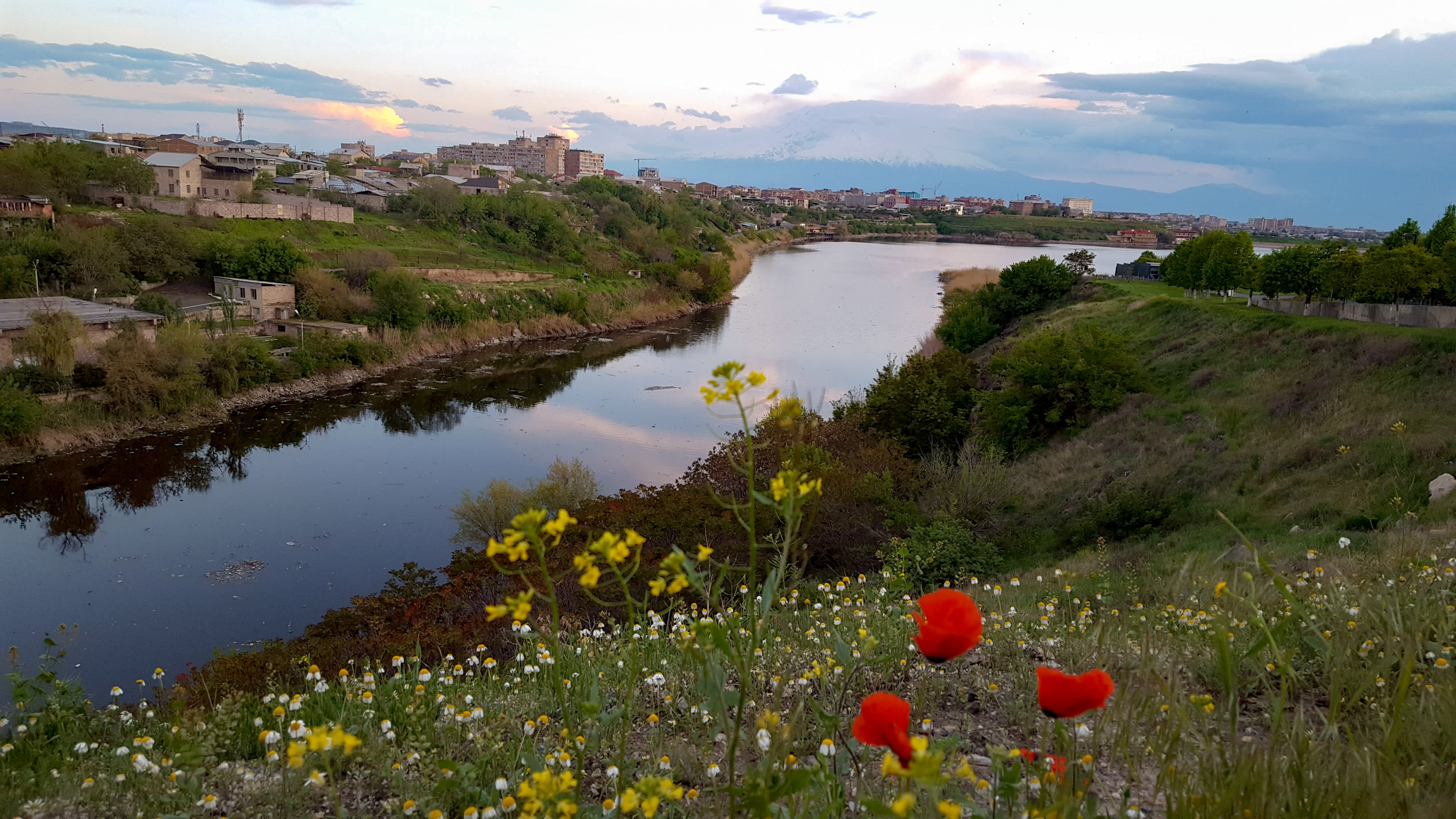
The Hrazdan river flowing into the Yerevan Lake

Yerevan Lake (Armenian: Երևանյան լիճ (Yerevanyan lich)) is an artificial reservoir located in the capital of Armenia in Yerevan, between Malatia-Sebastia and Shengavit districs of the city, southwest of the Hrazdan Gorge.

== History and background ==
The Lake was formed between 1963 and 1966, after the construction of the barrier on Tamantsineri Street, to be opened in 1967 - 1970. It aims to regulate the flow of the Hrazdan (Zangu) River and use its waters.

The Lake is located at an altitude of 908 m. The area is 0.65 km2, the average depth is 8 meters with maximum depth of 18 meters. The water volume is 4.8 million m3, the useful volume is 0.7 million m3. The total volume of water released from the Yerevan Reservoir can reach 286 cubic meters per second. The reservoir has five locks.

The dam is earthen, lined with reinforced concrete slabs, its length is 480 m, and its maximum height is 29 m.

The free flow of the upper reaches of the Hrazdan River has been regulated, the Echmiadzin and Parakar canals begin from the Lake.

Irrigation water is released through a bottom spillway built on the right bank. A ditch intake was built along the length of the right bank of the lake (364 m) to remove floating bodies.

The banks of the lake are partially concreted. Artificial beaches have been created. A lifeguard station and a rowing school operate next to the Lake.

The Lake has a three-jet fountain.

The Yerevan-Echmiadzin highway runs near the lake. The Lake acts as a bridge between the right-bank and left-bank regions of Yerevan. North of the lake, on the course of the Hrazdan River, is the Yerevan Red Bridge, which used to be the main access to the city from the southwest until 1945, when the Victory Bridge was built further upstream.

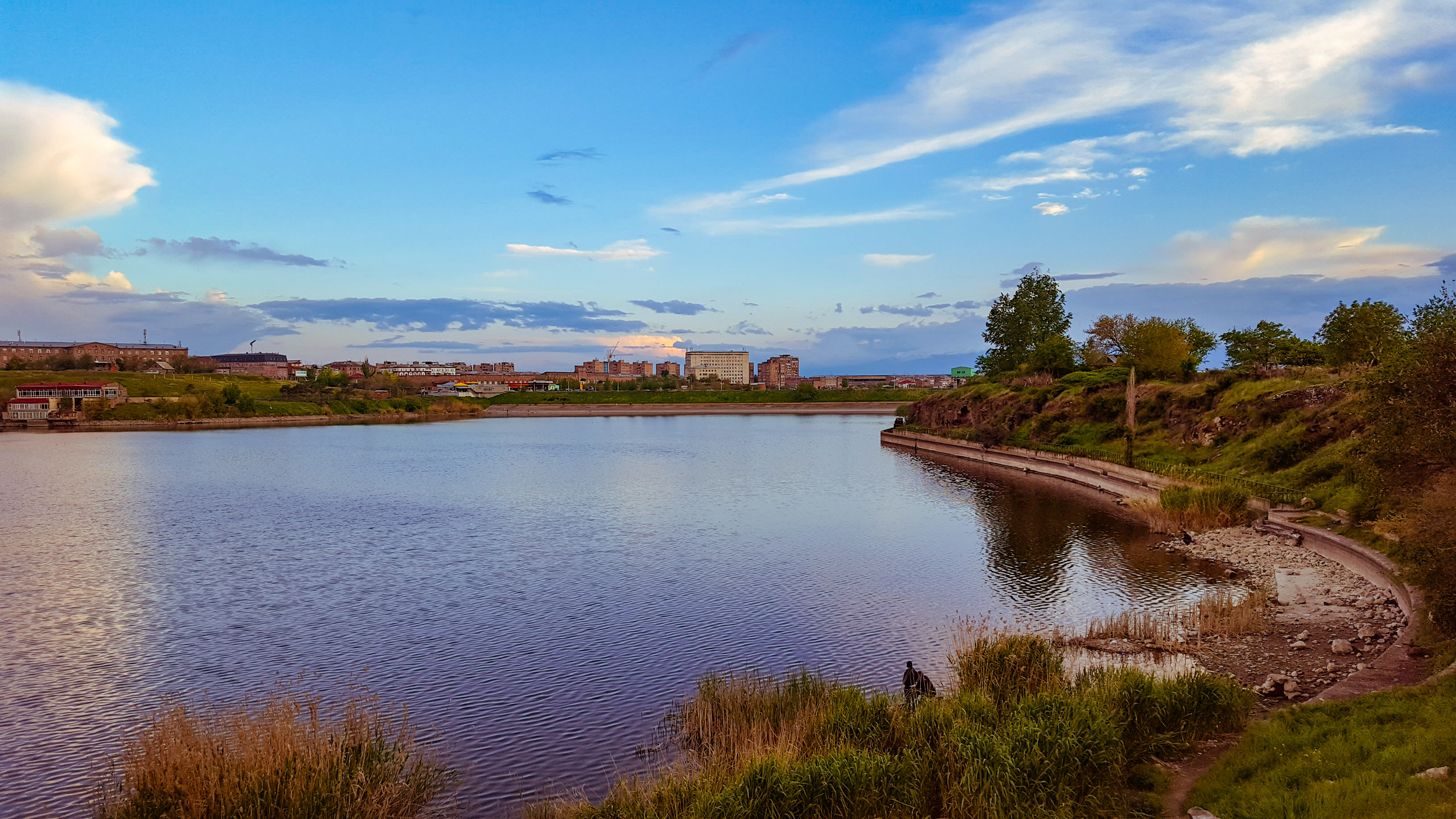
View of the Yerevan Lake

The United States Embassy in Yerevan, which is currently the second largest U.S. Embassy in terms of its territory, stands on the northern shore of the lake, along the M5 highway that connects the capital to its airport.

The Cathedral of the Exaltation of the Holy and Life-Giving Cross of the Lord Russian Orthodox Church is located not far from the Lake. The Monument of Gratitude (Monument dedicated to the Armenian-Arab friendship), the Yerevan Alashkert Stadium (formerly Nairi Stadium), the Chess Academy of Armenia, the Yerevan Figure Skating and Hockey Sports School, and the High school of water sports are located around the lake, and across it are the Dalma Gardens.

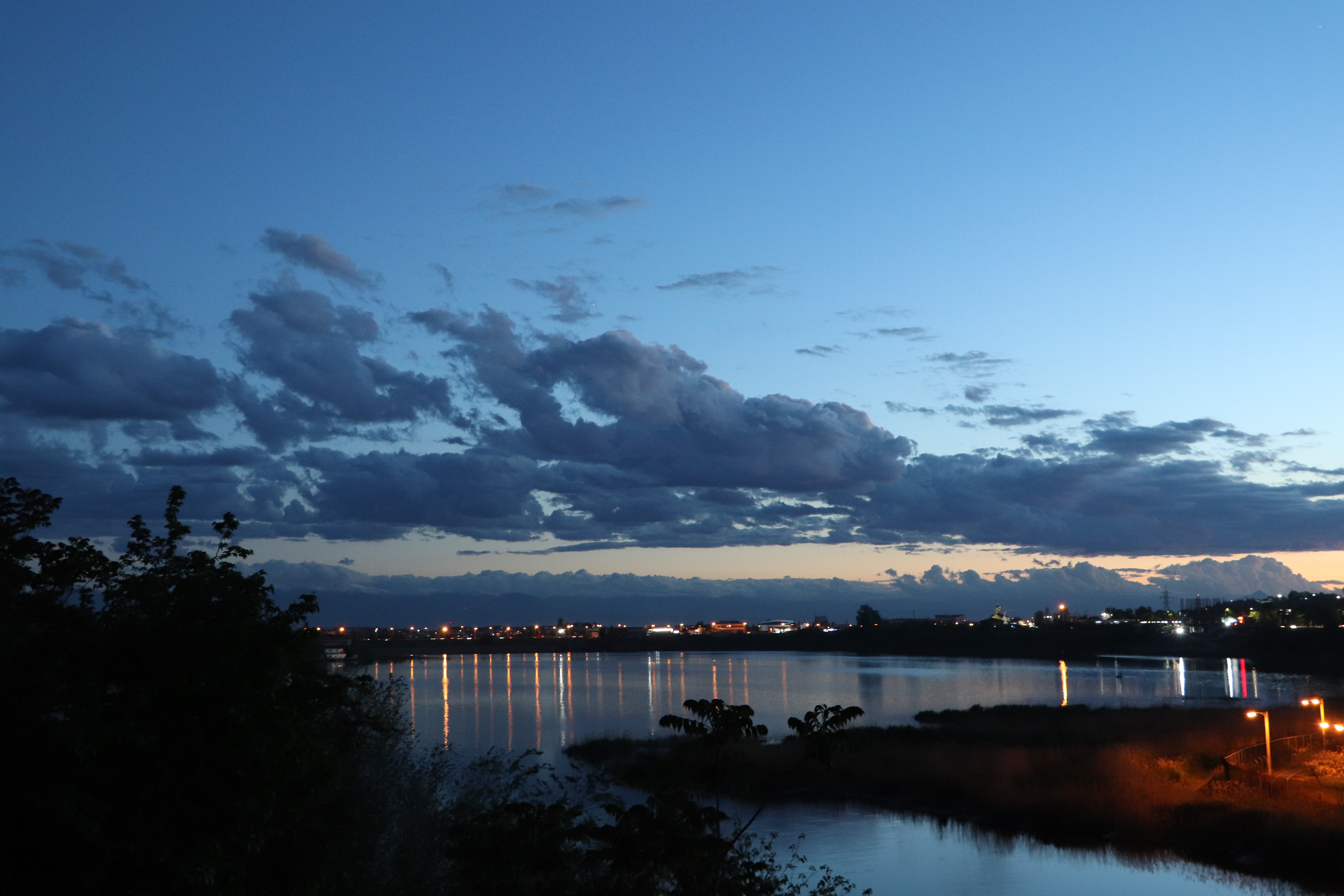
Yerevan Lake sunset

The reservoir and adjacent areas have been renovated in 2022, a modern park was built, and the level of pollution in the lake has been minimized.

The lake rarely freezes in winter.

The Lake Yerevan is of great importance for the formation of the surrounding microclimate and the urban recreation area. In addition to providing irrigation water reserves, the lake mitigates the city's microclimate in the summer.

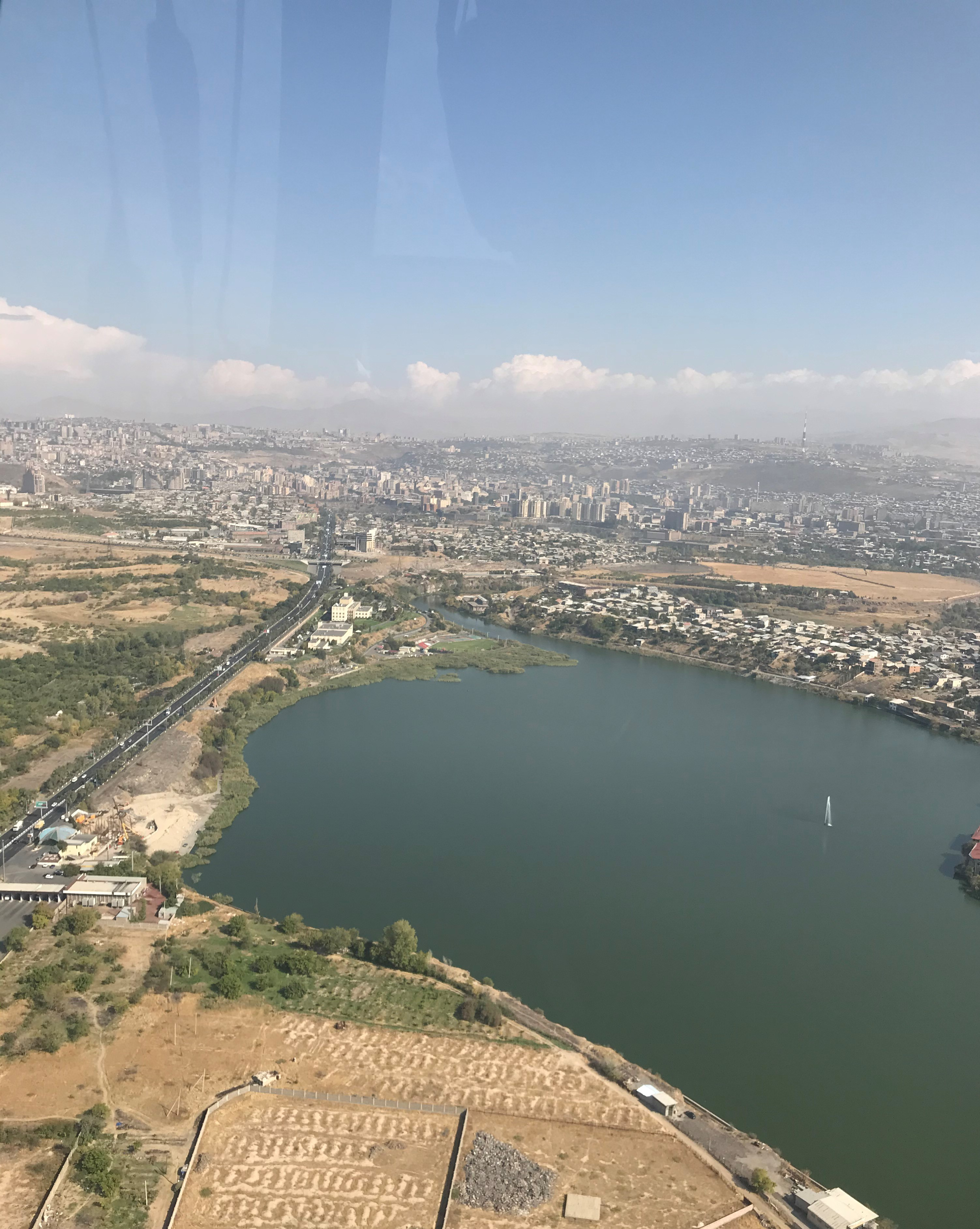
Yerevan Lake, view from above

There are fish (varicorhinus, bream, carp) and crustaceans in the lake. Birds like the European herring gull, white stork, black tern, great grebe live in the lake.

The Yerevan Lake is located on the territory of the former village of Nor Koghb, the population of which was resettled to another district in Yerevan. If the water level is lowered the remains of the old bridge of Nor Koghb connecting the two banks of the Hrazdan river that can still be seen in the bottom of the reservoir. Traces of the ancient Umeshin Canal, the famous Urartian canal built in the 7th century BC by the Urartian king Rusa II (685-645 BC) that irrigated the gardens of Echmiadzin and Zvartnots, also remain under the lake.

The Lake is next to the Ancient Settlement Shengavit, in Hradzan canyon, which itself has been inhabited since time immemorial. In 1966-1975 archaeological excavations led by Harutyun Martirosyan revealed obsidian tools from the Paleolithic era, dating back 100,000 - 400,000 years, found in a cave on the right bank of the lake, which at that time belonged to the hunter-gatherers who lived there. In the Paleolithic era an entire economy was run in this area and human and animal bones were also excavated. Some of these discoveries are kept now in the Yerevan History Museum. However, only one-third of the caves have been explored. Due to the rising water level, further exploration was impossible, leaving the cave's secrets largely unexplored. Since they are now under the lake or are located on the neighbouring grounds of the US Embassy in Yerevan (the site of the Embassy occupies an area of 90,469 square meters (22 acres)), they are not available for further exploration by Armenian archaeologists and speleologists.

In 2018, the reservoir was examined for the presence of cyanobacteria and cyanotoxins. The main species identified in the reservoir were cyanobacteria of the genus Microcystis, Dolichospermum and Planktothrix.

== 1976 bus accident ==
There was a tragic accident in the evening of 16 September 1976. A trolleybus with 91 passengers on board jumped off the sidewalk and plunged into the water from the road section of the Yerevan Reservoir Dam. The lack of protective barriers on the dam was also a contributing factor to the accident.

On that day Shavarsh Karapetyan - an eleven-time world record-breaker in finswimming, 17-time world champion, 13-time European champion - was training with his brother Kamo Karapetyan, also a finswimmer, their team members and coach on the Lake shore: Karapetyan had just completed his usual distance of 20 km (12 mi) when he heard the sound of a crash and saw a sinking trolleybus which had gone out of control and fallen from the dam wall. The trolleybus lay at the bottom of the reservoir some 25 meters (80 ft) off the shore at a depth of 10 meters (33 ft). Karapetyan, then 23 years old, swam to it and, under conditions of almost zero visibility due to the silt rising from the bottom, broke the back window with his legs. The trolleybus was crowded, it carried 92 passengers and Karapetyan knew he had little time, spending some 30 to 35 seconds for each person he saved. Shavarsh Karapetyan would go down to the bottom of the lake, pull people out of the water, and hand the injured person over to his brother Kamo Karapetyan. Kamo Karapetyan would then transfer the injured to boats, and the boats would take them to shore, from where they would be transported to the nearest hospital. Shavarsh Karapetyan pulled out a total of 37 people, and saved 20 lives. Others managed to reach the shore on their own through the window Shavarsh Karapetyan broke, or were pulled out with the help of rescuers. However, a total of 46 did not survive, including the driver. The trolleybus was pulled out of the water in just 45 minutes. Rescue workers, kayakers and canoeists training at the lake, and emergency doctors participated in the rescue operations. Shavarsh Karapetyan developed pneumonia and sepsis, and subsequent lung complications prevented Karapetyan from continuing his sports career.
