= Vidny, Voronezh Oblast =

Vidny Видный
- Settlement
- Location within Voronezh Oblast Location within Russia
- Coordinates: 51°10′N 41°00′E
- Country: Russia
- Region: Voronezh Oblast
- District: Talovsky District
- Time zone: UTC+3:00

Vidny (Russian: Видный) is a rural locality (a settlement) in Dobrinskoye Rural Settlement, Talovsky District, Voronezh Oblast, Russia. The population was 201 as of 2010.

== Geography ==
Vidny is located 24 km northeast of Talovaya (the district's administrative centre) by road. Abramovka is the nearest rural locality.
