= List of trolleybus systems in Ukraine =

Ukraine has numerous trolleybus systems throughout the country, both past and present.

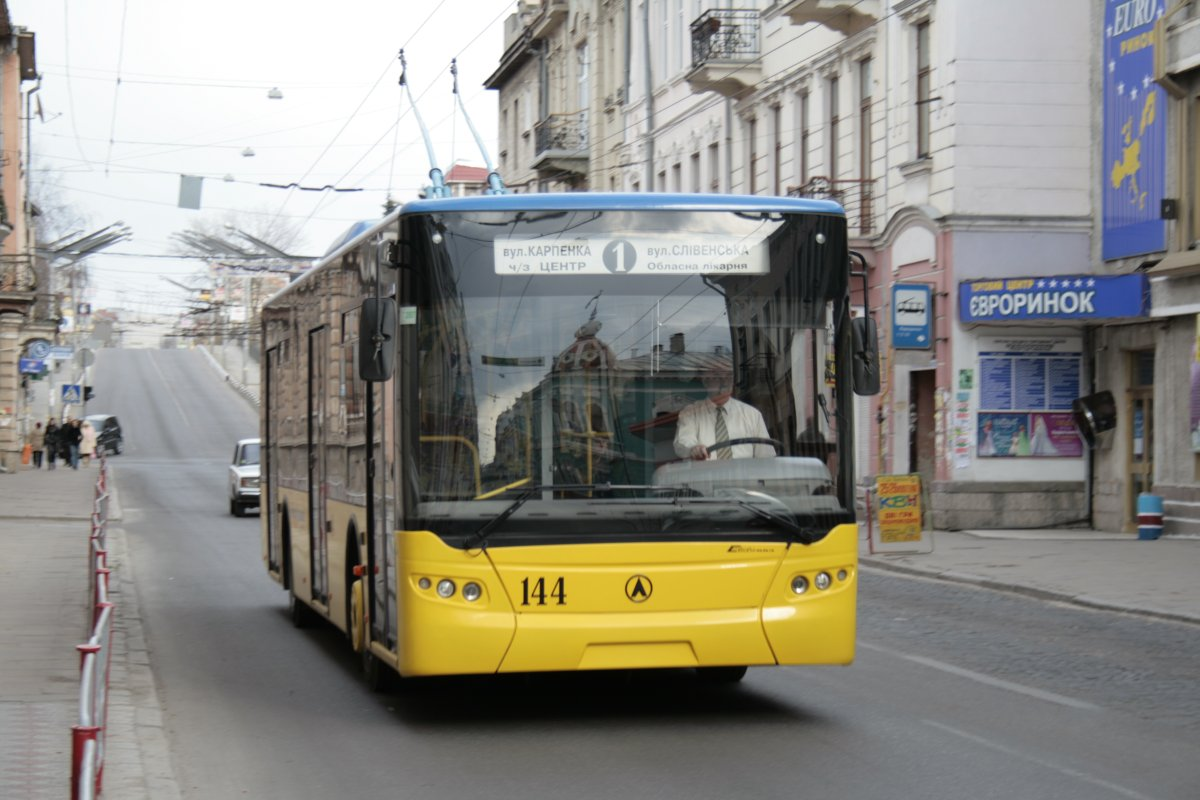
LAZ trolleybus in Ternopil, Ukraine

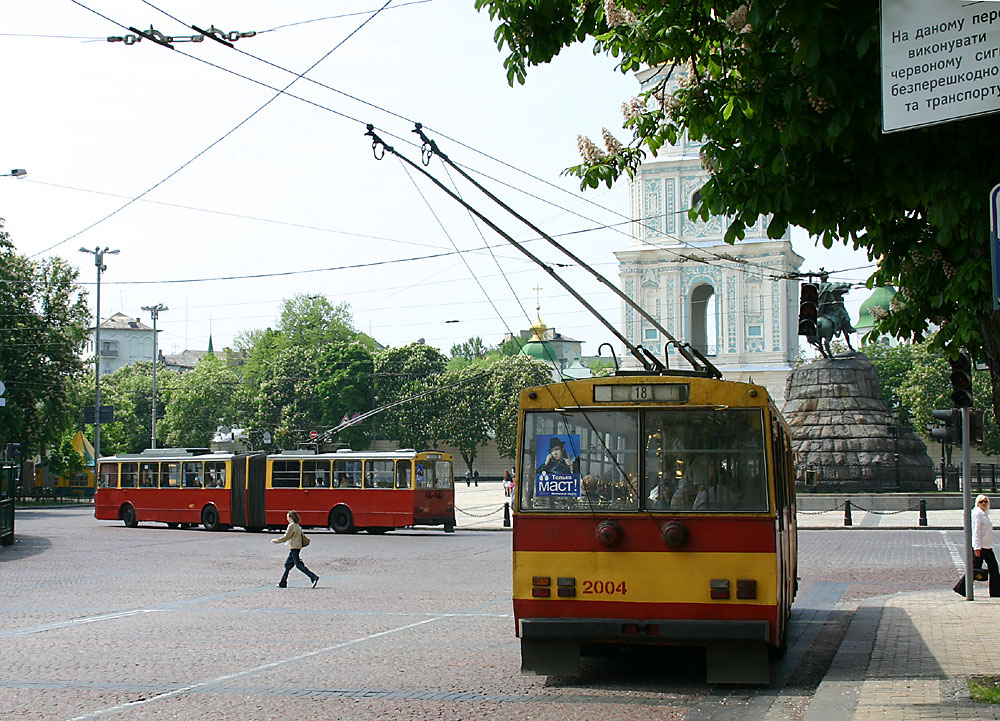
Trolleybuses in Kyiv

Trolleybusses in Ukraine
Name (in Ukrainian) (Note: Links to Ukrainian Wikipedia articles for each city.)	Cities	Administrative subdivision	Years operating	Notes
Cherkasy trolleybus (Черкаський тролейбус)	Cherkasy	Cherkasy	9 November 1965–present	REF
Chernihiv trolleybus (Чернігівський тролейбус)	Chernihiv	Chernihiv	4 November 1964–present	REF
Chernivtsi trolleybus (Чернівецький тролейбус)	Chernivtsi	Chernivtsi	1 February 1939–present	REF
Crimean trolleybus (Кримський тролейбус)	Alushta, Simferopol, Yalta	Crimea	1 May 1961–present	Simferopol – Alushta opened 6 November 1959. Alushta – Yalta opened July 1961. World's longest trolleybus line, 86.7 km (53.7 mi). Whole line opened 6 November 1959; Simferopol trolley opened 7 October 1959; Alushta opened 20 August 1993.
Kerch trolleybus (Керченський тролейбус)	Kerch	Crimea	18 September 2004–present	REF
Dnipro trolleybus (Дніпровський тролейбус)	Dnipro	Dnipropetrovsk	7 November 1947–present	REF
Kryvyi Rih trolleybus (Криворізький тролейбус)	Kryvyi Rih	Dnipropetrovsk	21 December 1957–present	REF
Bakhmut trolleybus (Бахмутський тролейбус)	Bakhmut	Donetsk	29 April 1968–29 June 2022	Closed due to extensive damage sustained during the Battle of Bakhmut.
Dobropillia trolleybus (Добропільський тролейбус)	Dobropillia	Donetsk	23 August 1968–15 March 2011	REF
Donetsk trolleybus (Донецький тролейбус)	Donetsk	Donetsk	3 January 1940–present	REF
Toretsk trolleybus (Торецький тролейбус)	Toretsk	Donetsk	26 April 1985–15 May 2007	City was named Dzerzhynsk during the entire period of trolleybus operation, but was renamed Toretsk in 2016.
Horlivka trolleybus (Горлівський тролейбус)	Horlivka	Donetsk	6 November 1974–present	REF
Khartsyzk trolleybus (Харцизький тролейбус)	Khartsyzk	Donetsk	4 February 1982–present	REF
Kramatorsk trolleybus (Краматорський тролейбус)	Kramatorsk	Donetsk	18 November 1971–28 February 2026	Operation suspended due to proximity to the front line and general impracticality of continuing operations.
Makiivka trolleybus (Макіївський тролейбус)	Makiivka	Donetsk	13 November 1969–present	Trolleybus line from Donetsk extended to Makiivka on 7 November 1960, however no connection exists between the Donetsk and Makiivka trolleybus systems.
Mariupol trolleybus (Маріупольський тролейбус)	Mariupol	Donetsk	21 April 1970–2 March 2022	Operation suspended due to extensive damage sustained during the Siege of Mariupol. A few undamaged trolleybuses continue to operate in battery-only mode with charging in the depot.
Sloviansk trolleybus (Слов'янський тролейбус)	Sloviansk	Donetsk	19 March 1977–3 March 2026'	Overhead lines dismantled to allow installation of anti-drone nets.
Vuhlehirsk trolleybus (Вуглегірський тролейбус)	Vuhlehirsk	Donetsk	8 July 1982–12 August 2014	Closed due to extensive damage sustained during the War in Donbas.
Ivano-Frankivsk trolleybus (Івано-Франківський тролейбус)	Ivano-Frankivsk	Ivano-Frankivsk	31 December 1983–present	REF
Kharkiv trolleybus (Харківський тролейбус)	Kharkiv	Kharkiv	5 May 1939–present	REF
Kherson trolleybus (Херсонський тролейбус)	Kherson	Kherson	16 June 1960–present	REF
Khmelnytskyi trolleybus (Хмельницький тролейбус)	Khmelnytskyi	Khmelnytskyi	25 December 1970–present	REF
Kropyvnytskyi trolleybus (Кропивницький тролейбус)	Kropyvnytskyi	Kirovohrad	4 November 1967–present	REF
Kyiv trolleybus (Київський тролейбус)	Kyiv	Kyiv	5 November 1935–present	REF
Bila Tserkva trolleybus (Білоцерківський тролейбус)	Bila Tserkva	Kyiv	23 June 1980–present	REF
Alchevsk trolleybus (Алчевський тролейбус)	Alchevsk	Luhansk	26 September 1954–16 July 2022	An intercity trolleybus line from Alchevsk to Perevalsk operated from 1962 to 2008. Closed due to extensive artillery damage to the depot and rolling stock sustained in the Russo-Ukrainian War.
Antratsyt trolleybus (Антрацитівський тролейбус)	Antratsyt	Luhansk	27 September 1987–July 2018	REF
Sorokyne trolleybus (Сорокинський тролейбус)	Sorokyne	Luhansk	30 December 1987–31 May 2023	Closed 31 May 2023.
Luhansk trolleybus (Луганський тролейбус)	Luhansk	Luhansk	25 January 1962–19 July 2022	Closed 19 July 2022.
Lysychansk trolleybus (Лисичанський тролейбус)	Lysychansk	Luhansk	7 March 1972–25 February 2022	Closed due to extensive damage sustained during the Battle of Lysychansk.
Sieverodonetsk trolleybus (Сєвєродонецький тролейбус)	Sieverodonetsk	Luhansk	1 January 1978–27 February 2022	Closed due to extensive damage sustained during the Battle of Sievierodonetsk.
Kadiivka trolleybus (Кадіївський тролейбус)	Kadiivka	Luhansk	1 March 1970–31 August 2011	Operation suspended 11 September 2008 – 15 July 2010
Lviv trolleybus (Львівський тролейбус)	Lviv	Lviv	27 November 1952–present	REF
Mykolaiv trolleybus (Миколаївський тролейбус)	Mykolaiv	Mykolaiv	29 October 1967–present	REF
Odesa trolleybus (Одеський тролейбус)	Odesa	Odesa	5 November 1945–present	Originally built in 1941, and trolley coaches were bought just before World War II started. But due to war hardships, the system was not able to be opened until 1945.
Kremenchuk trolleybus (Кременчуцький тролейбус)	Kremenchuk	Poltava	6 November 1966–present	REF
Poltava trolleybus (Полтавський тролейбус)	Poltava	Poltava	14 September 1962–present	REF
Rivne trolleybus (Рівненський тролейбус)	Rivne	Rivne	27 December 1974–present	REF
Sevastopol trolleybus (Севастопольський тролейбус)	Sevastopol	Sevastopol	6 November 1950–present	REF
Sumy trolleybus (Сумський тролейбус)	Sumy	Sumy	25 August 1967–present	REF
Ternopil trolleybus (Тернопільський тролейбус)	Ternopil	Ternopil	24 December 1975–present	REF
Vinnytsia trolleybus (Вінницький тролейбус)	Vinnytsia	Vinnytsia	20 February 1964–present	REF
Lutsk trolleybus (Луцький тролейбус)	Lutsk	Volyn	8 April 1972–present	REF
Zaporizhzhia trolleybus (Запорізький тролейбус)	Zaporizhzhia	Zaporizhzhia	22 December 1949–present	REF
Zhytomyr trolleybus (Житомирський тролейбус)	Zhytomyr	Zhytomyr	1 May 1962–present	REF

== See also ==
- List of trolleybus systems, for all other countries
- Trolleybuses in former Soviet Union countries
- Trolleybus usage by country
- List of town tramway systems
- List of light-rail transit systems
- List of rapid transit systems

== Sources ==
=== Books and periodicals ===
- Murray, Alan. 2000. "World Trolleybus Encyclopaedia" (ISBN 0-904235-18-1). Reading, Berkshire, UK: Trolleybooks.
- Peschkes, Robert. 1987. "World Gazetteer of Tram, Trolleybus and Rapid Transit Systems, Part Two: Asia & USSR /Africa/Australia" (ISBN 0-948619-00-7). London: Rapid Transit Publications.
- "Straßenbahnatlas ehem. Sowjetunion / Tramway Atlas of the former USSR" (ISBN 3-926524-15-4). 1996. Berlin: Arbeitsgemeinschaft Blickpunkt Straßenbahn, in conjunction with Light Rail Transit Association, London.
- Trolleybus Magazine (ISSN 0266-7452). National Trolleybus Association (UK). Bimonthly.
