= Vidny =

Vidny (Russian: Ви́дный; masculine), Vidnaya (Ви́дная; feminine), or Vidnoye (Ви́дное; neuter) is the name of several inhabited localities in Russia.

Urban localities

- Vidnoye, Moscow Oblast, a town in Leninsky District of Moscow Oblast

Rural localities

- Vidny, Stavropol Krai, a settlement in Stavropolsky Selsoviet of Blagodarnensky District of Stavropol Krai
- Vidny, Ulyanovsk Oblast, a settlement in Novoselkinsky Rural Okrug of Melekessky District of Ulyanovsk Oblast
- Vidny, Voronezh Oblast, a settlement in Dobrinskoye Rural Settlement of Talovsky District of Voronezh Oblast
- Vidnoye, Khabarovsk Krai, a selo in Vyazemsky District of Khabarovsk Krai
