= List of trolleybus systems in Russia =

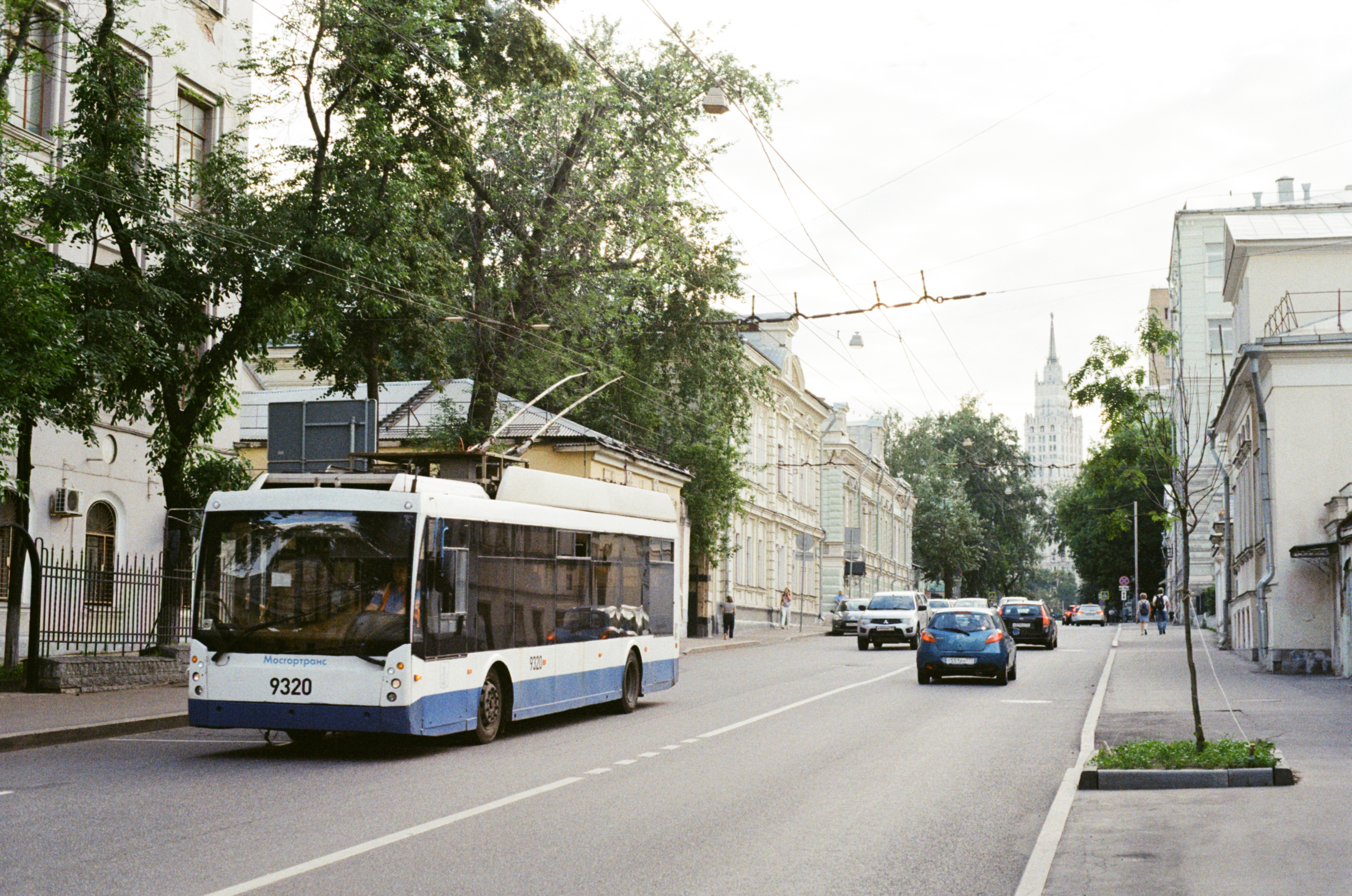
Trolza trolleybus in Moscow, Russia

This is a list of trolleybus systems in Russia. It includes all trolleybus systems, past and present.

== List of trolleybus systems ==
=== Central Federal District ===
Region	Location	From	To	Depots (as of July 2021)	Routes	Vehicles (as of July 2021)	Notes
Belgorod obl.	Belgorod	3 December 1967	30 June 2022	1	4	53	Operated by LLC 'Best' at time of closing.
Belgorod obl.	Stary Oskol	-	-	-	-	-	Construction started in 1989, not completed.
Bryansk obl.	Bryansk	3 December 1960	-	1	11	93	-
Vladimir obl.	Vladimir	5 November 1952	-	1	9	70	'Officially' opened on 7 November 1952
Vladimir obl.	Kovrov	6 March 1975	-	1	6+2 special	57	-
Voronezh obl.	Voronezh	6 November 1960	-	1	4	61	Only 33 in actual service
Ivanovo obl.	Ivanovo	5 November 1962	-	1	11	138	108 in service
Kaluga obl.	Kaluga	30 March 1956	-	1	14	107	70 in service
Kostroma obl.	Kostroma	10 January 1974	30 June 2023	1	7	53	Operated by MUE 'Trolleybusnoe Upravlenie'
Kursk obl.	Kursk	21 August 1972	-	1	8	80	-
Lipetsk obl.	Lipetsk	1 February 1972	15 August 2017	1	5	39	Trolleybuses were operated by MUP 'Lipetskpassazhirtrans' Statistics at time of closing
Moscow	Moscow	15 November 1933	25 August 2020	3	6	649	Numbers given are at the time of closure. The first trolleybus system in Russia and in former USSR, it was the largest trolleybus system in the world for many years, from circa the mid-1950s until 2017. One trolleybus route retained as an attraction.
Moscow obl.	Khimki (Khimki trolleybus)	24 July 1997	-	1	3	45	2 routes (out of 3) run between Khimki and Moscow city Operated by MUP 'Khimkielektrotrans'
Moscow obl.	Podolsk	1 May 2001	-	1	5	47	Operated by MUE “Podolskiy Trolleybus”
Moscow obl.	Vidnoye	9 September 2000	-	1	3	21	Operated by MUE 'Vidnoe Trolleybus Depot'
Oryol obl.	Oryol	29 October 1968	-	1	4	59	Operated by MUP 'Tram and trolleybus enterprise'
Ryazan obl.	Ryazan	13 November 1949	-	2	15	188	Another depot is not in use, but not 'closed'. 126 vehicles in use
Smolensk obl.	Smolensk	8 April 1991	-	1	4	102	Operated by Smolensk Municipal Unitary Tram and Trolleybus Enterprise
Tambov obl.	Tambov	5 November 1955	30 September 2025	1	3	15	Operated by ME 'Tambovgorstrans' 7 vehicles in operation
Tver obl.	Tver	5 May 1967	14 April 2020	1	7	104	-
Tula obl.	Tula	5 November 1962	-	1	7	100	Operated by MUE 'Tulgorelectrotrans'
Yaroslavl obl.	Rybinsk	14 December 1976	-	1	4	61	Operated by JSC Rybinskelectrotrans
Yaroslavl obl.	Yaroslavl	7 November 1949	-	1	7	107	Operated by JSC 'Yargorelectrotrans'

=== Far Eastern Federal District ===
Region	Location	From	To	Depots	Routes	Vehicles	Notes
Region	Location	From	To	(As of September 2012)			Notes
Amur obl.	Blagoveshchensk	22 August 1979	08 July 2016	1	2	31	-
Khabarovsk krai	Khabarovsk	17 January 1975	-	1	4	54	-
Primorsky krai	Vladivostok	29 January 1965	-	1	4	38	-

=== Northwestern Federal District ===
Region	Location	From	To	Depots	Routes	Vehicles	Notes
Region	Location	From	To	(As of September 2012)			Notes
Arkhangelsk obl.	Arkhangelsk	14 October 1974	11 April 2008	-	-	-	Operation suspended October 2006 - December 2007.
Vologda obl.	Cherepovets	-	-	-	-	-	Construction started in 1992; stopped ca. 1996, remaining infrastructure dismantled 2008
Vologda obl.	Vologda	30 December 1976	-	1	6	90	-
Kaliningrad obl.	Chernyakhovsk	27 November 1936	January 1945	-	-	-	Operated by Stadtwerke Omnibusbetrieb Insterburg Closed because of war damage. During the period of operation of the trolleybus network, the city was known as Insterburg.
Kaliningrad obl.	Kaliningrad	15 October 1943	27 January 1945	-	-	-	Closed because of war damage
Kaliningrad obl.	Kaliningrad	5 November 1975	-	1	4	60	-
Karelia	Petrozavodsk	5 September 1961	-	1	8	121	See Trolleybuses in Petrozavodsk
Leningrad obl.	Gatchina	-	-	-	-	-	Construction started in 2004; following plans drawn up in the late 1980s. Construction was suspended in 2005 and is not expected to resume.
Leningrad obl.	Tosno	-	-	-	-	-	Reported by one source as under construction. No information since 2002.
Murmansk obl.	Murmansk	11 February 1962	-	2	5	141	World's northernmost trolleybus system.
Novgorod obl.	Veliky Novgorod	3 December 1995	-	1	5	40	-
Saint Petersburg	Saint Petersburg	21 October 1936	-	6	44	742	Operation suspended Nov 1941 - 1945 because of war.

=== Siberian Federal District ===
Region	Location	From	To	Depots	Routes	Vehicles	Notes
Region	Location	From	To	(As of September 2012)			Notes
Altai krai	Barnaul	19 October 1973	-	1	5	57	-
Altai krai	Rubtsovsk	28 December 1973	-	1	2	49	-
Zabaykalsky krai	Chita	30 December 1970	-	1	5	77	-
Irkutsk obl.	Irkutsk	6 November 1970	-	1	5	40	-
Irkutsk obl.	Bratsk	1 February 1975	-	1	5	50	-
Kemerovo obl.	Kemerovo	25 September 1970	-	1	10	88	-
Kemerovo obl.	Leninsk-Kuznetsky	11 January 1984	-	1	3	31	-
Kemerovo obl.	Novokuznetsk	1 January 1978	-	1	4	53	-
Krasnoyarsk krai	Krasnoyarsk	5 November 1959	-	2	8	140	-
Novosibirsk obl.	Novosibirsk	6 November 1957	-	4	14	322	-
Omsk obl.	Omsk	5 November 1955	-	2	10	216	-
Tomsk obl.	Tomsk	7 November 1967	-	1	8	93	-
Khakassia	Abakan	31 December 1980	-	1	12	24	-

=== Southern Federal District ===
Region	Location	From	To	Depots	Routes	Vehicles	Notes
Region	Location	From	To	(As of September 2012)			Notes
Adygea	Maykop	29 November 1974	-	1	12	53	-
Astrakhan obl.	Astrakhan	5 November 1967	30 October 2017	1	3	40	-
Volgograd obl.	Volgograd	31 December 1960	-	4	15	357	-
Volgograd obl.	Kamyshin	-	-	-	-	-	Construction started 1985 and stopped 1991.
Volgograd obl.	Volzhsky	-	-	-	-	-	Construction started in early 1990s; stopped 1998.
Dagestan	Makhachkala	3 February 1973	18 December 2025	1	3	46	-
Kabardino-Balkaria	Nalchik	22 November 1980	-	1	4	52	-
Karachay–Cherkessia	Cherkessk	19 December 1988	-	1	9	42	-
Krasnodar krai	Armavir	16 June 1973	-	1	5	44	-
Krasnodar krai	Krasnodar	28 July 1950	-	2	17	209	-
Krasnodar krai	Novorossiysk	1 April 1969	-	1	14	79	-
North Ossetia	Vladikavkaz	1 February 1977	8 August 2010	1	2	12	A PKTS-6281.00 'Admiral' trolleybus was delivered on May 30, 2022.
Stavropol krai	Stavropol	24 July 1964	-	1	9	96	-
Rostov obl.	Rostov-on-Don	18 March 1936	-	2	8	108	-
Rostov obl.	Shakhty	30 September 1975	27 October 2007	-	-	-	-
Rostov obl.	Taganrog	25 December 1977	5 May 2022	1	7	35	Operated by MUE 'TTU' Trolleybus traffic suspended since May 2022 due to repairs on electricity substations.
Rostov obl.	Volgodonsk	4 October 1977	-	1	6	32	-
Chechnya	Grozny	31 December 1975	December 1994	-	-	-	Closed because of war damage.

=== Urals Federal District ===
Region	Location	From	To	Depots	Routes	Vehicles	Notes
Region	Location	From	To	(As of September 2012)			Notes
Kurgan obl.	Kurgan	24 November 1965	29 April 2015	1	4	33	-
Sverdlovsk obl.	Kachkanar	11 November 1972	December 1985	-	-	-	-
Sverdlovsk obl.	Kamensk-Uralsky	1 November 1956	3 March 2015	1	3	59	-
Sverdlovsk obl.	Nizhny Tagil	-	-	-	-	-	Reported by only one source as under construction. Other sources state that construction was planned for 1996 but did not start.
Sverdlovsk obl.	Yekaterinburg	17 October 1943	-	2	19	356	-
Tyumen obl.	Tyumen	12 June 1970	5 October 2009	-	-	-	Service operated by ME 'Trolleybusnoe Predpriyatie'
Khanty–Mansi AO	Surgut	-	-	-	-	-	Reported by only one source as under construction. No confirmation, no recent information.
Chelyabinsk obl.	Chelyabinsk	22 November 1942	-	3	22	360	-
Chelyabinsk obl.	Miass	1 February 1985	-	1	5	69	-

=== Volga Federal District ===
Region	Location	From	To	Depots	Routes	Vehicles	Notes
Region	Location	From	To	(As of September 2012)			Notes
Bashkortostan	Sterlitamak	24 February 1961	-	2	23	195	-
Bashkortostan	Ufa	27 January 1962	-	2	21	211	-
Kirov obl.	Kirov	8 November 1943	-	2	8	157	-
Mari El	Yoshkar-Ola	1 February 1971	-	1	12	158	-
Mordovia	Saransk	29 January 1966	-	2	17	141	-
Nizhny Novgorod obl.	Dzerzhinsk	15 April 1976	-	1	5	79	-
Nizhny Novgorod obl.	Nizhny Novgorod	27 June 1947	-	3	21	227	-
Orenburg obl.	Orenburg	1 May 1953	-	1	5	99	-
Penza obl.	Penza	4 November 1948	-	2	6	100	-
Perm krai	Berezniki	14 March 1961	28 February 2026	1	4	25	Numbers at time of closure
Perm krai	Perm	5 November 1960	30 June 2019	1	13	136	-
Samara obl.	Novokuybyshevsk	4 January 1986	-	1	16	56	-
Samara obl.	Samara	7 November 1942	-	3	16	259	-
Samara obl.	Syzran	1 September 2002	1 November 2009	-	-	-	-
Samara obl.	Tolyatti	21 January 1966	-	1	21	183	-
Saratov obl.	Balakovo	18 November 1967	-	2	10	60	-
Saratov obl.	Engels	29 April 1964	-	1	4	55	-
Saratov obl.	Saratov	6 November 1952	-	2	11	220	-
Tatarstan	Almetyevsk	13 January 1976	-	1	4	48	-
Tatarstan	Kazan	27 November 1948	-	2	16	238	-
Udmurtia	Izhevsk	6 November 1968	-	2	11	245	-
Ulyanovsk obl.	Ulyanovsk	31 December 1973	-	1	7	57	-
Chuvashia	Cheboksary	7 November 1964	-	3	19	301	-
Chuvashia	Novocheboksarsk	2 November 1979	-	1	4	48	-

== See also ==
- List of trolleybus systems, for all other countries
- List of town tramway systems in Russia
- List of light-rail transit systems
- List of rapid transit systems
- Trolleybuses in former Soviet Union countries
- Trolleybus usage by country

== Sources ==
=== Books and periodicals ===
- Murray, Alan. 2000. "World Trolleybus Encyclopaedia" (ISBN 0-904235-18-1). Reading, Berkshire, UK: Trolleybooks.
- Peschkes, Robert. 1987. "World Gazetteer of Tram, Trolleybus and Rapid Transit Systems, Part Two: Asia & USSR /Africa/Australia" (ISBN 0-948619-00-7). London: Rapid Transit Publications.
- "Straßenbahnatlas ehem. Sowjetunion / Tramway Atlas of the former USSR" (ISBN 3-926524-15-4). 1996. Berlin: Arbeitsgemeinschaft Blickpunkt Straßenbahn, in conjunction with Light Rail Transit Association, London.
- Tarkhov, Sergei. 2000. "Empire of the Trolleybus: Vol 1 - Russia" (ISBN 0-948619-02-3). London: Rapid Transit Publications.
- Trolleybus Magazine (ISSN 0266-7452). National Trolleybus Association (UK). Bimonthly.
