= Trolleybuses in Petrozavodsk =

Transit system in Karelia, Russia

Petrozavodsk trolleybus system
- Петрозаводский троллейбус Petroskoin trolleibus Petroskoin johdinauto
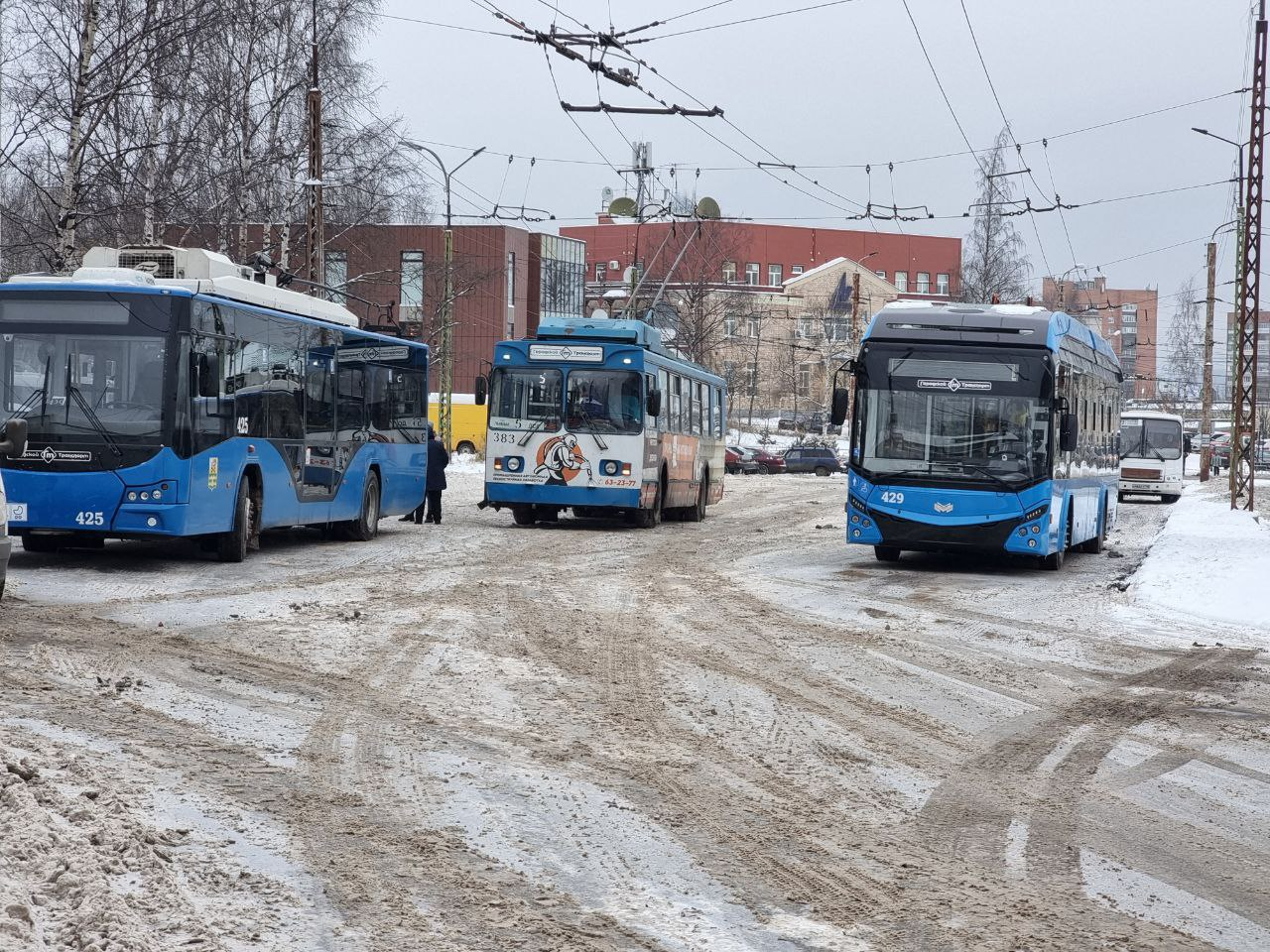
- (From left to right) VMZ-5298.01 "Avangard", MTRZ-6223 and BKM 321 in 2022

Operation
- Locale: Petrozavodsk, Russia
- Open: 1961
- Status: Open
- Routes: 6
- Operator: Gorodskoy Transport

Infrastructure
- Electrification: (?) V DC parallel overhead lines
- Depot: 1
- Stock: 65

Statistics
- Website: http://ptzgortrans.ru

The Petrozavodsk trolleybus system is the only existing trolleybus system in the Republic of Karelia of the Russian Federation and is one of the northern most trolleybus systems in the world. It is operated by the city-owned public transportation company "Gorodskoy Transport". As of April 2023, the network consisted of 6 lines, with 41 operational trolleybuses and 24 in storage.

== History ==
In 1934 the Chairman of the Council of People's Commissars of the Karelian ASSR Edward Gylling suggested creating a trolleybus system in the city but the plans were cancelled after the beginning of World War II.

The construction of the system began in 1947 but the launch was delayed by many years due to various problems.

The system opened on September 5, 1961, along route No. 1 "Tovarnaya Kontora - Kirov Square" and used ZiU-5 trolleybuses.

In 2004, the Trolleybus Administration was reorganized into OJSC "Trolleybus Department of the City of Petrozavodsk" and renamed to "Gorodskoy Transport" in 2010.

Up until 2008 new lines were being planned out but due to the lack of funding and manpower many of the lines were closed down.

Some of the lines had to be changed or closed down due to the lack of maintenance of the Soviet infrastructure.

Due to the lack of fuding "Gorodskoy Transport" often buys used trolleybuses from Moscow and Saint-Peterburg.

In 2023 a transport reform has started which seeks to increase the amount of active lines and upgrade the rolling stock.

== Lines ==
Petrozavodsk trolleybus map as of 2022

Currently Active
Number	Route	Frequency
1	Kemskaya – Sudostroitel'naya – Klychevaya – Onezhskoy Flotilii – Rigachina – Chernyshevskogo – Lunacharskogo – Aleksandra Nevskogo – "Pravdy" – Kuibisheva – Lenina – Shotmana – Chapaeva – Lesnoy – Lososinskoe – Chistaya	10-23 min.
3	Zavodskaya – Pervomaisky – Moskovskaya – Varkausa – Kirova – Lenina – Gagarina – Krasnoarmeiksaya – Aleksandra Nevskogo – Lunacharskogo – Radisheva – Hlebokombinat	15-29 min.
5	Lyzhnaya – Rovio – Komsomolsky – Krasnoarmeiksaya – Gagarina – Lenina – Kirova – Varkausa - Zaitseva – "DSK"	12-29 min.
6	Korabelov – Antonova – Repnikova – Klychevskoye – Kalinina – Aleksandra Nevskogo – "Pravdy" – Kuibysheva – Lenina – Kirova – Varkausa – Moskovskaya – Pervomaisky – Melen'tyevoi	14-31 min.
7a	Korabelov – Antonova – Repnikova – Klychevskoye – Lyzhnaya – Rovio – Komsomolsky – Rovio	up to 40 min. (excluding weekends and holidays)
8	Zavodskaya – Pervomaisky – Moskovskaya – Varkausa – Kirova – Lenina – Gagarina – Shotmana – Chapaeva – Lesnoy – Lososinskoe – Chistaya	30-38 min.

Currently Inactive
Number	Route	Length	Date
1A	Trolleybus Control – Avangard	17 km.	1983–1984
2	The same route as current line 5		1964–1976, 1982–2018
2A	Rovio – Gagarina	6,1 km.	1986–1987
3A	Zavodskaya – Rovio	19 km.	1977–1984
4	Lyzhnaya – Oktyabyrsky		1976–2021
4A	Rovio – Mashinostroitelny kolledzh	12 km.	1985
5A	Lyzhnaya – Gagarina	9,4 km.	1988–1996
5Д	Trolleybus Control – Gagarina	7,8 km.	
6A	Korabelov – Cargo station	22,4 km.	2003–2004
7	Same as 7a	23 km.	2004–2007
8A	Chapaeva – Chistaya		2024
9	Korabelov – Cargo station	22,4 km.	2006–2008
10	Heikkonena – Park kultury i otdykha	17 km.	2007–2008
Э	Pobeda cinema – Kirova Square	5,1 km.	2005

== The fleet ==
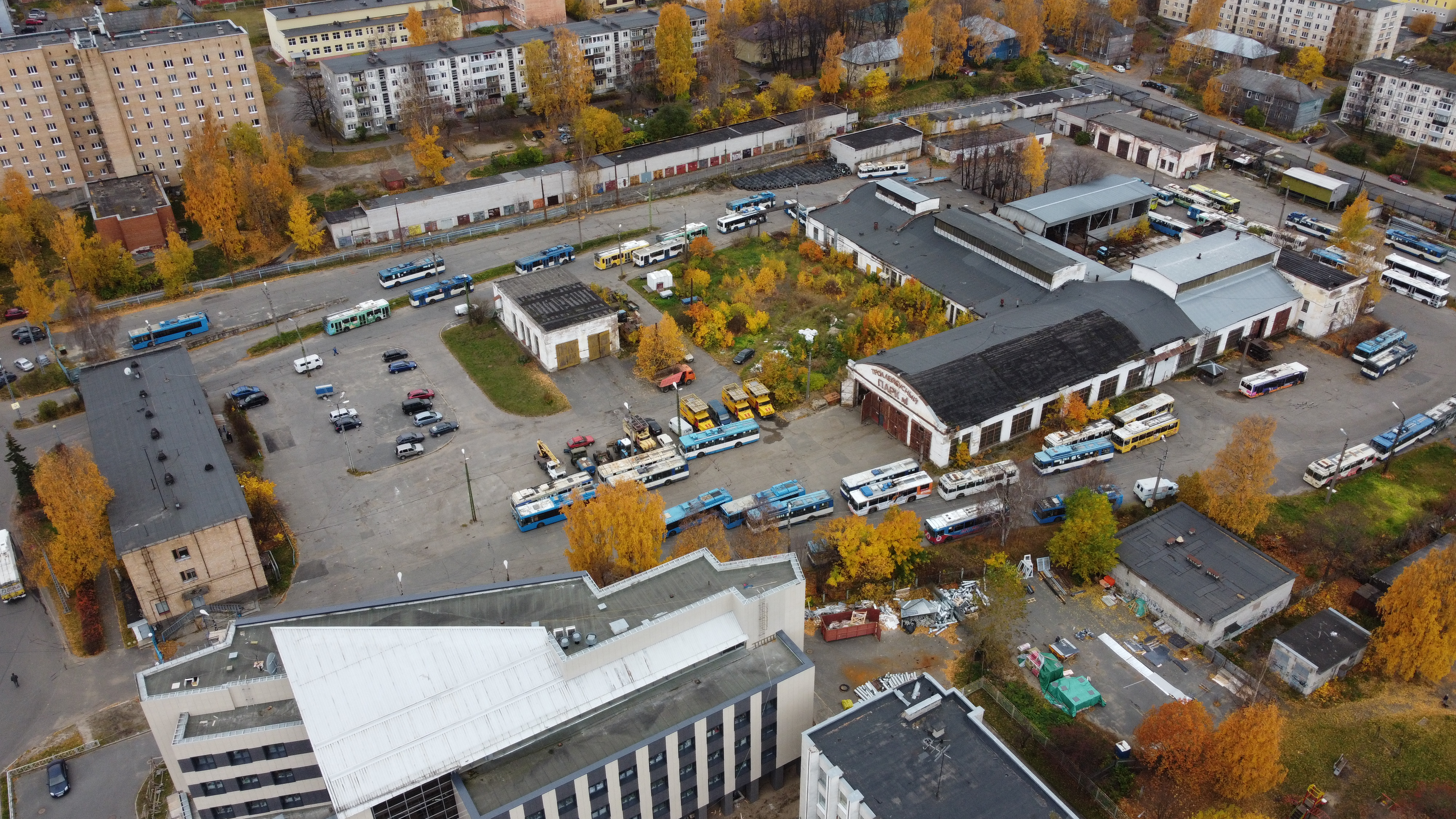
Trolleybus depot

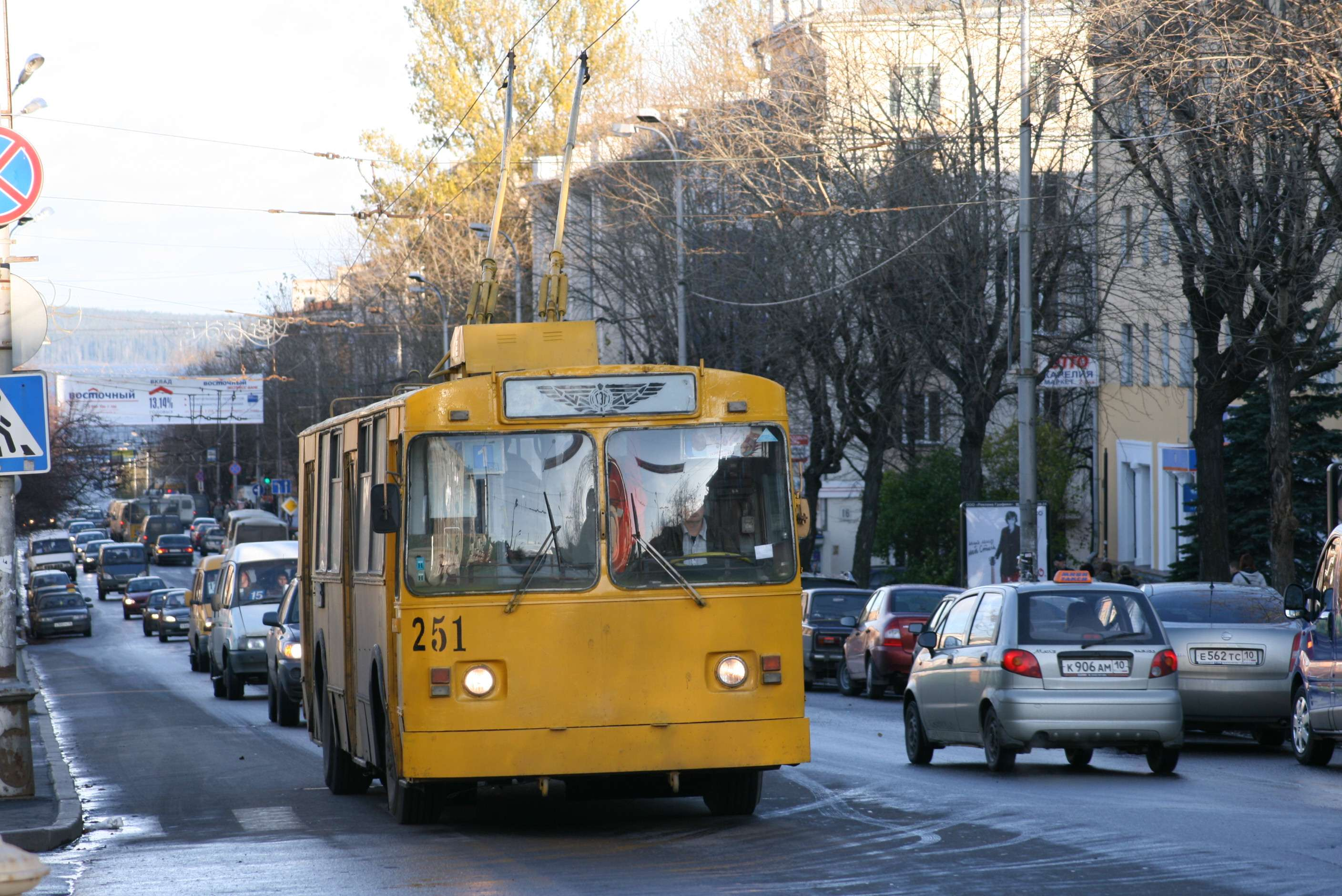
ZiU-682V-012 [V0A] with the pre-reorganization logo, 2008

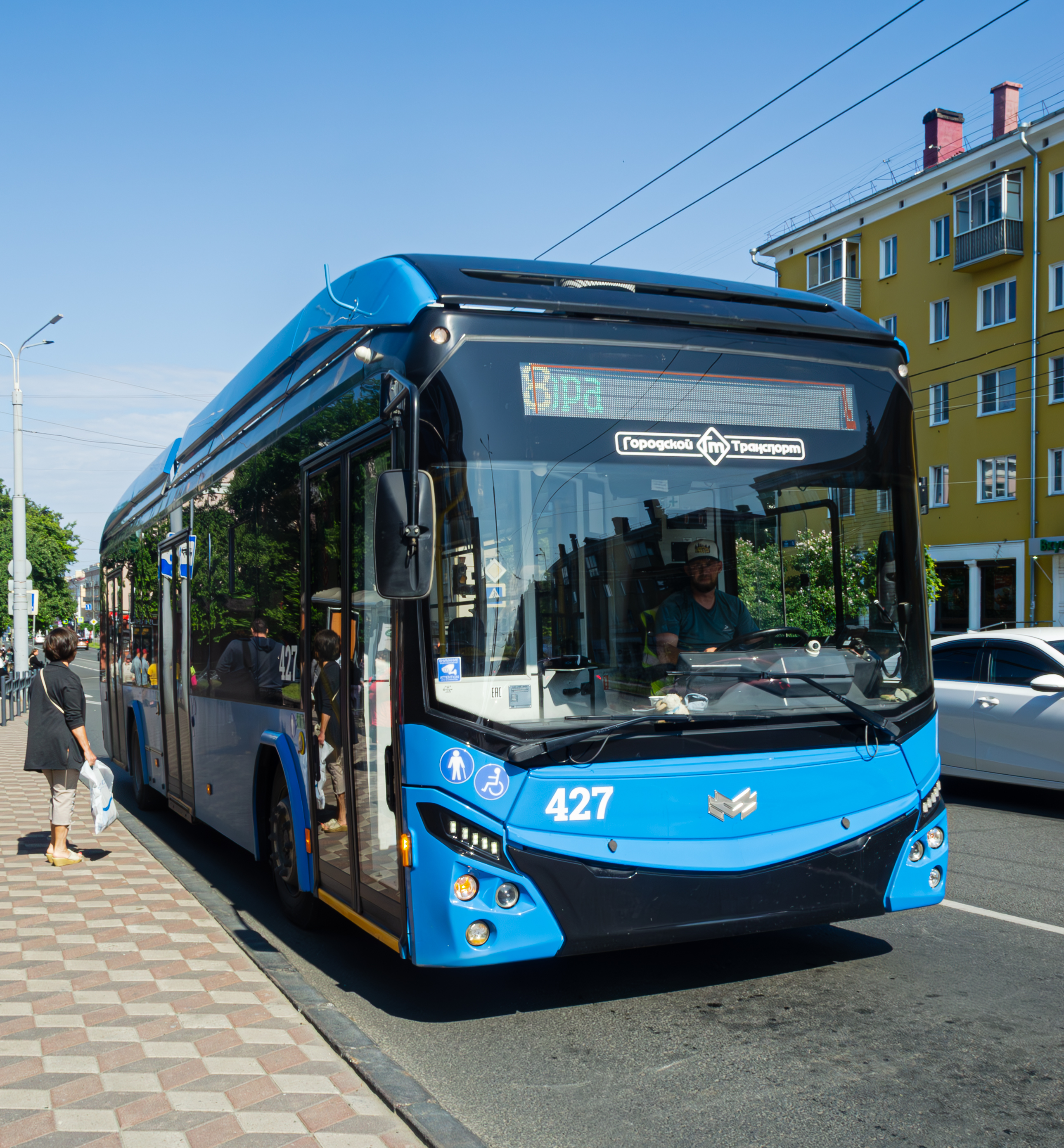
BKM-321 on Lenin Avenue

Model	Number	Years of Operation	Operated as for 2024	Total Amount
ZiU-5	01—49	1961—1977	0	49
ZiU-5G	50—67	1967—1981	0	18
ZiU-5D	68—85	1969—1981	0	18
ZiU-682B	86—139, 141—150	1973—1990	0	64
ZiU-682V	86—139, 141—150	1979—1995	0	52
ZiU-682V (B00)	203—246, 248	1985—2022	0	45
ZiU-682V-012 [V0A]	247, 249—264	1985—2022	0	17
ZiU-682V-013 [V0V]	265—272	1990—2022	0	8
ZiU-682G [G00]	273—319	1991–2023	0	47
ZiU-682G-012 [G0A]	320—323	1995—2021	0	3
ZiU-682G-016.02	358—361, 372—376	Since 2009	3	8
VMZ-170	322, 325, 382	2000—2021	0	3
VMZ-5298.01-50 "Avangard"	370, 371, 409, 413, 415, 417-430, 432, 452, 501-527	Since 2012	12	19
VZTM-5284	324, 326–333, 335, 379, 403, 405, 406, 411	Since 2003	1	16
MTRZ-5279-0000012	334-338	2005—2022	0	1
LiAZ-5280 (VZTM)	339—345, 347, 348, 350–357, 359	Since 2005	0	21
LiAZ-5280	362—367, 369	Since 2009	1	7
LiAZ-5280.02 (PT)	346, 349	2006—2008	0	2
MAZ-103T	368	2010—2016	0	1
KTG-1	140	1977—1994	0	1
BTZ-52768T	377,378	2018—2022	0	2
VMZ-5298-020	385	2018—2022	0	1
VMZ-5298-23-01	380	2018—2021	0	1
MTRZ-6223-0000010	381, 383, 384, 386, 397, 399, 402, 404	Since 2018	1	9
MTRZ-52791 "Sadovoye Kol'tso"	387—400	2020—2022	0	10
PTZ-5283	407	2021—2021	0	1
BKM 321	427, 429, 434, 436, 438	Since 2022	4	5
VMZ-5298.01 (VMZ-463)	439, 441, 444—450	Since 2023	0	7
Trolza-5275.03 "Optima"	443, 454	Since 2023	0	2
VMZ-52981	440	Since 2023	0	1
VMZ-5298-22	442	Since 2023	0	1

== See also ==
- List of trolleybus systems
- List of trolleybus systems in Russia
