= Khimki War Memorial =

Coordinates: 55°53′45″N 37°25′5″E

Khimki War Memorial is a memorial to two Soviet pilots and four Red Army soldiers in Novoluzhinskoe cemetery, Khimki, Russia.

The memorial and the graves were originally located near Leningradskoye Shosse, a major highway leading from Moscow to the international Sheremetyevo Airport. The remains of the pilots and soldiers were exhumed under the sanction of Khimki authorities in April 2007, and reburied later with military honours to a newly built memorial on the Alley of Heroes in the Novoluzhinskoe cemetery, in the centre of Khimki.

Soldiers buried in Khimki War Memorial:

1. Mikhail Alexandrovich Rodionov (died June 1942),
Junior Lieutenant, pilot, Hero of the Soviet Union
2. Boris Alexandrovich Borodavkin
(died February 13, 1943), Lieutenant
3. Ivan Azarovich Chistiakov
(died January 1942), Lieutenant
4. Alexey Georgievich Levin
(died 1941), Sergeant, pilot
5. Sergey Vasilyevich Maximov
(died August 26, 1942), Private
6. Ivan Alexeyevich Pupychkin
(died November 30, 1941), Private

== "Removal" controversy ==
The original "demolition" of the war memorial on April 18 created a controversy in Russia. Several sources reported that the remains of the war heroes were lost. According to an early report, officials used bulldozers to demolish the memorial, leaving some of the remains on site. Several sources reported that the remains of the war heroes were lost. This was later proved to be not true.

Among the reasons for the relocation the officials of Khimki cited the complaints about prostitutes hanging around at night. Another incentive for the removal of the graves was the need to widen the highway.

The communist columnist, Anatoly Baranov, argued that it was the prostitutes who were to be lifted, not the veterans. On Sunday, April 22, a group of members of the Union of Communist Youth staged a protest at the site. The militsiya dispersed the meeting with force, as it was not sanctioned by the authorities. Several of those taking part were arrested; they later claimed to have been beaten and declared a hunger strike.

The Khimki war memorial relocation incident was widely and not always appropriately used in relation to the Bronze Soldier of Tallinn controversy at the time.

== Reburial ==
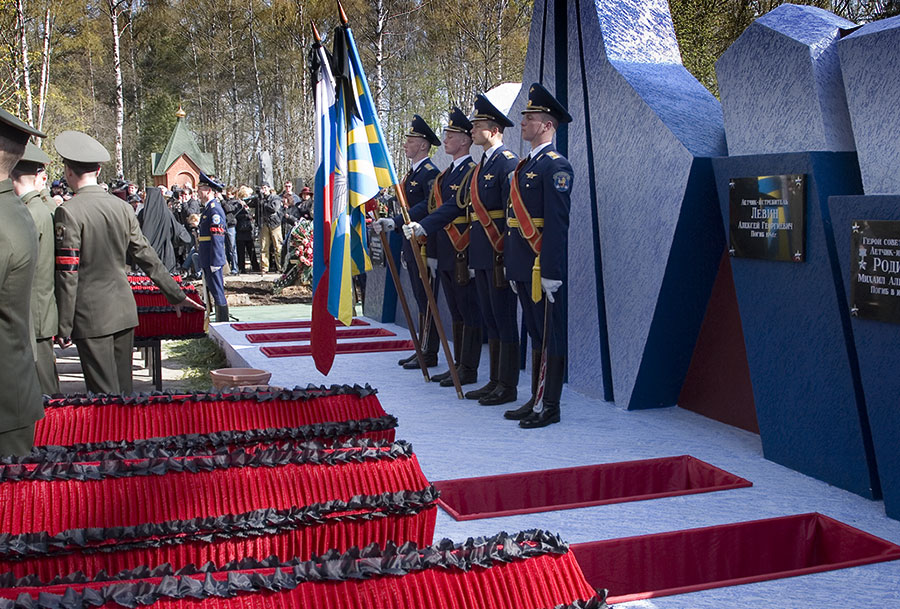
The reburial of war heroes on May 6, 2007.

On 6 May 2007, the major TV channels of Russia showed the footage of the reburial of the exhumed remains at the Novoluzhinskoe cemetery, located in the centre of the city. The solemn ceremony was attended by about 1,000 people, including many veterans. An armoured carrier led the funerary procession. "The fallen heroes were remembered with a triple gun salvo from a Moscow Military District regiment."
