= Khimki trolleybus =

Trolleybus system in Khimki, Moscow Oblas

Operation
- Locale: Khimki, Moscow Oblast
- Open: 20 September 1996
- Operator: MUE 'Khimkielektrotrans'

Khimki trolleybus (Russian: Химкинский троллейбус) is a trolleybus system in Khimki, Moscow Oblast. Opened on 24 April 1997... It is operated by Municipal Unitary Enterprise "Khimkielektrotrans" (Russian: МУП "Химкиэлектротранс").

== History ==
First trolleybus route was open in trial mode at 20 September 1996 with 1 car. The regular operation started on April, 24 of 1997 with 5 cars in peak hours and 1 car in other time on the route.

On 22 September 2001, the first interregion route "2" started operation between Druzhbi street and metro station "Planernaya". 1 January 2005 route "2" changed its number to "22" because in Moscow Oblast all interregion routes should have numbers starting from 20, but, some months later, the route number was changed to "202", because in Moscow, another route "22" existed from 16 Parkovaya street to Komsomolskaya Square.

On 7 September 2006, route 1 was extended to "Rodina" Stadium.

The most recent extension of the system happened on 2 September 2009, when the third route (203) started operation from "Rodina" Stadium to metro station "Planernaya".

A new trolleybus line, No.17, was planned to be launched on 1 January 2016, however, it has yet to enter operation.

From 25 August 2020, until 4 September 2020, routes 202 and 203 were the only trolleybus routes in Moscow because of the closure of the Moscow trolleybus.

In 2020 and 2021, 17 low floor trolleybuses were transferred from Moscow to Khimki due to the closure of the Moscow trolleybus system.

== Routes ==
There are currently three routes in operation:

- Route 1 – Druzhbi street – "Rodina" stadium
- Route 202 – Druzhbi street – Planernaya station
- Route 203 "Rodina" stadium – Planernaya station

As routes 202 and 203 run into Moscow city, parts of it are controlled by the Moscow city government. This has led to disagreements in locations of stops and resulted in inconveniences in transferring from the Moscow Metro to either of the trolleybus lines.

== Rolling stock ==
The rolling stock of Khimki trolleybus consist of 29 cars, most of them are Soviet-Russian trolleybuses ZiU-682G-016.05 and ZiU-682G-016 [G0M] (23 cars). Another 6 cars were purchased between 2013 and 2018, 4 cars are TrolZa-5265 "Megapolis" and 2 cars are VMZ-5298.01 "Avangard".

Table of the Khimki trolleybus rolling stock
Model	Number of.	Notes
ZiU-682G-016.05	12 cars	
ZiU-682G (With major repair in Ivanovo)	1 car	
ZiU-682G-015 (018)	2 cars	
ZiU-682G-016 [G0M]	6 cars	
Trolza-5265.00 "Megapolis"	5 car/2 cars	Some were transferred from Moscow
VMZ-5298.01 "Avangard"	2 cars	
Trolza-5265.02 "Megapolis"	1 cars	
Trolza-5265.08 "Megapolis"	1 cars	
BKM-321	12 cars	Transferred from Moscow after closure of trolleybus

The number in Italics indicates cars that are temporarily out of service.
