= Khimki =

City in Moscow Oblast, Russia

Khimki Химки
- City
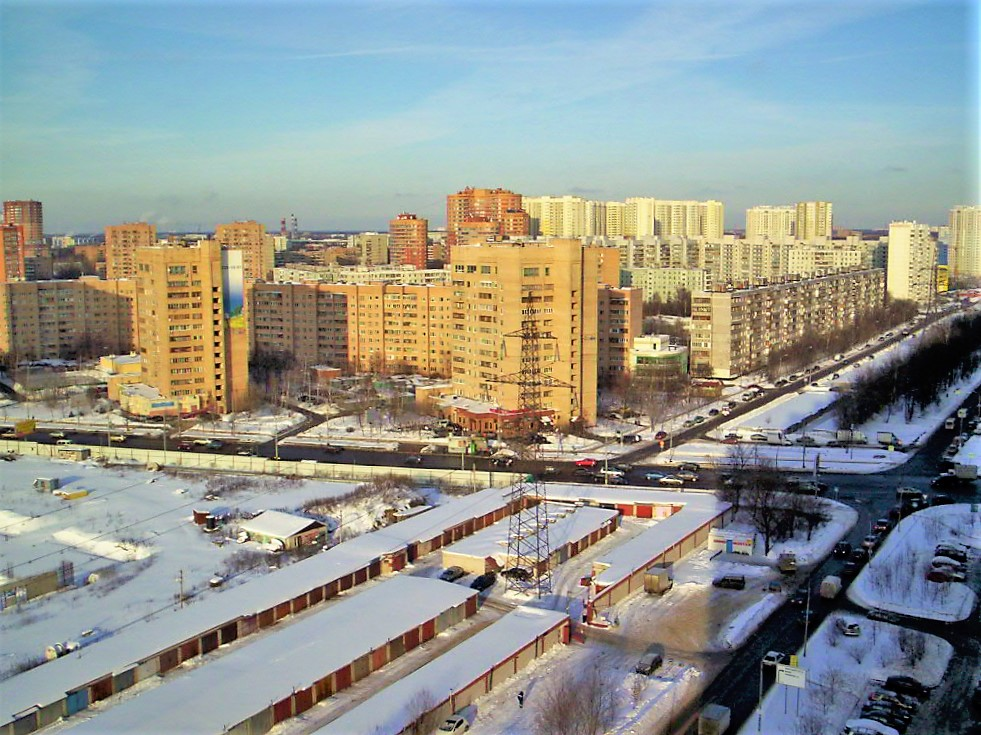
- Babakina Street in Khimki (February 2010)

- Flag Coat of arms
- Interactive map of Khimki
- Location of Khimki Khimki (Moscow Oblast) Khimki (European Russia) Khimki (Europe)
- Coordinates: 55°53′21″N 37°26′42″E
- Country: Russia
- Federal subject: Moscow Oblast
- Founded: 1939

Government
  - Mayor: Dmitry Voloshin

Area
  - Total: 109.81 km^{2} (42.40 sq mi)
- Elevation: 180 m (590 ft)

Population (2010 Census)
  - Total: 207,425
  - Estimate (2025): 259,399 (+25.1%)
  - Rank: 90th in 2010
  - Density: 1,888.9/km^{2} (4,892.3/sq mi)

Administrative status
  - Subordinated to: Khimki City Under Oblast Jurisdiction
  - Capital of: Khimki City Under Oblast Jurisdiction

Municipal status
  - Urban okrug: Khimki Urban Okrug
  - Capital of: Khimki Urban Okrug
- Time zone: UTC+3 (MSK)
- Postal code: 141400-141446
- Dialing codes: +7 495, 498
- OKTMO ID: 46783000001
- Website: admhimki.ru

Khimki (Russian: Химки, IPA: [ˈxʲimkʲɪ]) is a city in Moscow Oblast, Russia. It is located approximately 18 kilometres (11 mi) northwest from central Moscow, and is part of the Moscow metropolitan area.

== History ==
=== Origins and formation ===
Khimki was initially a railway station that had existed since 1850 on the Moscow – Saint Petersburg Railway. The Moskva-Volga Canal was constructed between 1932 and 1937; Khimki lies on the west bank. Khimki was then officially founded in 1939.

=== Khimki in the Battle of Moscow ===
The German attack starting the Battle of Moscow (code-named 'Operation Typhoon') began on 2 October 1941. The attack on a broad front brought German forces to occupy the village of Krasnaya Polyana (now in the town of Lobnya) to Moscow's North West. Krasnaya Polyana was taken on 30 November.

Many sources state that at least one German army patrol visited Khimki. Similarly many sources state this as the closest point (8 km/4 or 5 mi) the Germans reached to Moscow (Khimki at the time was 8 km (4 or 5 mi), from the edge of Moscow). Among the sources stating the Germans visited Khimki the details of the date and unit involved are inconsistent and disputed. One story of events asserts a skirmish took place in Khimki on 16 October at the Leningradskoe Shosse bridge involving a German motorcycle unit, but this would have been far from the main body of German forces at that time. Another account is a patrol reached Khimki around 30 November or early December before returning to its main unit without combat. The dates mentioned for this second account vary. A myth surrounding this is that the Germans would have been able to see the Kremlin 19 kilometres (12 mi) in the distance from Khimki.

The Soviet Army counter offensive for "removing the immediate threat to Moscow" started on 5 December on the North-Western Front (the area around Khimki North West of Moscow). The South-Western Front and Western Fronts began their offensives on 6 December. The German forces were driven back. Moscow was never under such close land threat again during the war.

A memorial in the form of a giant tank trap is located at the "Kilometer 23" point 55°54′46.103″N 37°24′10.577″E) of Leningradskoye Highway (the highway to St. Petersburg). The memorial is 1.8 km (1.1 mi) south east of Molzhaninovo railway station. The memorial was unveiled on 6 December 1966 as a 25th anniversary recognition of the launch of the Soviet counter offensive. This location is just short of an intersection with the Moscow–St Petersburg railway (close to where the IKEA shopping centre has since been built). This memorial and shopping centre on the Northern side of Khimki has a direct distance of 22 kilometres from Moscow city centre. At the time of the conflict this location was outside Khimki. This memorial is different to the Khimki War Memorial moved in 2007 to in Novoluzhinskoe cemetery.

=== Post war ===
Khimki was home to several Soviet aerospace defense development centres that became the principal employers for the majority of the city population. This included R&D enterprises, which designed surface-to-air missiles for S-75, S-125, S-200, S-300 Soviet air defense systems, engines for intercontinental ballistic missiles and satellite launch vehicles, and other types of equipment. For this reason, Khimki was off limits for all foreigners visiting the country, despite its location on a highway between Moscow and its major international airport.

In 2010 the city saw protests over the construction of the new Moscow–Saint Petersburg motorway through the Khimki Forest.

The city of Khimki is adjacent to the city of Moscow, immediately beyond the Moscow Ring Road (MKAD).

== Population ==
Population: 257,128 (2021 Census); 207,425 (2010 Census); 141,000 (2002 Census); 132,902 (1989 Soviet census); 106,000 (1977); 23,000 (1939).

Historical population
Year	Pop.	±%
1926	2,876	—
1939	23,092	+702.9%
1959	47,800	+107.0%
1970	85,000	+77.8%
1979	117,974	+38.8%
1989	132,902	+12.7%
2002	141,000	+6.1%
2010	207,425	+47.1%
2021	257,128	+24.0%
Source: Census data

== Politics ==
Until 2001, the head of the Khimki region was Yuri Korablin, and the vice-head was Sergei Krivorotenko. In 2001, Korablin became a deputy of the Moscow Oblast Duma, and his post was automatically taken by the vice-head. Unlike other municipalities in the Moscow Oblast, the charter of the Khimki district clearly provided for this option.

In September 2003, Sergei Krivorotenko disappeared from the administration. Subsequently, a criminal case was opened against him, and on 25 July 2006, he was arrested and soon convicted.

In the elections on 7 December 2003, Vladimir Strelchenko was elected to the post of head of the Khimki district (20.0% of the votes, or 15,085); the vice-head was businessman Igor Belousov. Strelchenko was supported in the elections by the governor of the Moscow Oblast, Boris Gromov. The second candidate, Yevgeny Artamonov, received 16.8% of the vote (12,672).

In the 2009 elections, Vladimir Strelchenko was re-elected to the post of head of the Khimki urban district (50.4%, or 27,443). Igor Belousov also participated in the elections and scored 22.8% (12,401).

On 15 August 2012, Vladimir Strelchenko announced through the official website of the City Administration that he resigned, effective 17 August 2012. This information was confirmed by the Administration of the Governor of the Moscow Oblast. Maria Kitaeva, the governor's adviser on information issues, told ITAR-TASS, "he wrote a letter of resignation of his own free will." The statement was written after Strelchenko's conversation with Sergei Shoigu. One of the reasons for the resignation of Vladimir Strelchenko was the appearance of compromising evidence on the Himkileaks website.

On 17 August 2012, First Deputy Head of Administration Oleg Shakhov was appointed acting Head of the Khimki City District, having taken this position only two days earlier - on 15 August 2012. Before this, Shakhov worked as first deputy governor of the Tula Oblast. Having defeated opposition candidate Yevgeniya Chirikova in the elections held on 14 October 2012, Shakhov became the Head of the city district.

In November 2014, Oleg Shakhov was accused of fraud of 22 million rubles, after which he wrote a letter of resignation from the post of head of the city district, which was approved by the Council of Deputies of the city district. On 10 November 2014, Vladimir Sleptsov was appointed acting head of the Khimki administration, and in December of the same year he was confirmed as head of the district administration. On 14 November 2014, deputies of the Council of Deputies of the Khimki City District elected Alexander Dryannov as the new Head of the city district.

On 2 August 2016, Vladimir Sleptsov was appointed head of the Khimki city district. On 22 September 2016, Sleptsov resigned of his own free will. First Deputy Head of Administration Dmitry Voloshin was appointed acting head of the city district. In December 2016, by decision of the Council of Deputies, Dmitry Voloshin was elected head of the Khimki city district.

=== Parties ===
The Council of Deputies of the Khimki urban district consists of six parties: United Russia, the Communist Party of the Russian Federation, the Liberal Democratic Party of Russia, A Just Russia, Yabloko, and Rodina.

Secretary of the local branch of the United Russia Party - Dmitry Voloshin.

First secretary of the Khimki city branch of the Communist Party of the Russian Federation - Alexey Perfilov.

Coordinator of the Khimki branch of the LDPR - Nikolai Kovtun.

Chairman of the Khimki branch of A Just Russia - Mikhail Khorsev.

== Administrative and municipal status ==
Within the framework of administrative divisions, it is incorporated as Khimki City Under Oblast Jurisdiction—an administrative unit with the status equal to that of the districts. As a municipal division, Khimki City Under Oblast Jurisdiction is incorporated as Khimki Urban Okrug.

== Economy ==
The city enjoys a great deal of commercial activity due to its location between Moscow and one of its main airports, Sheremetyevo.

As of 2015 some aerospace-development centers located in Khimki contribute to a program of the International Space Station. Former Soviet aerospace and defense development centers located in Khimki:

- NPO Energomash is a company which primarily develops and produces liquid propellant rocket engines.
- NPO Lavochkin is an aerospace company, a major player in the Russian space program.
- MKB Fakel is a government-owned aerospace defense corporation dedicated to development of guided surface-to-air missiles.

Khimki hosts one of the largest shopping malls in Russia, which features French chain-store Auchan and Swedish furniture-retailer IKEA.

== Transportation ==
Khimki station is on the Moscow-St Petersburg Railway.

Road transport includes bus and trolleybus.

=== Trolleybus routes ===
1. Ulitsa Druzhby (Friendship street) - Rodina Stadium;
2. Ulitsa Druzhby - Planernaya metro station;
3. Rodina Stadium - Planernaya metro station.

=== October Railway stations and platforms in Khimki ===
- Levoberezhnaya
- Khimki
- Podrezkovo
- Skhodnya
- Firsanovskaya

=== Gallery ===
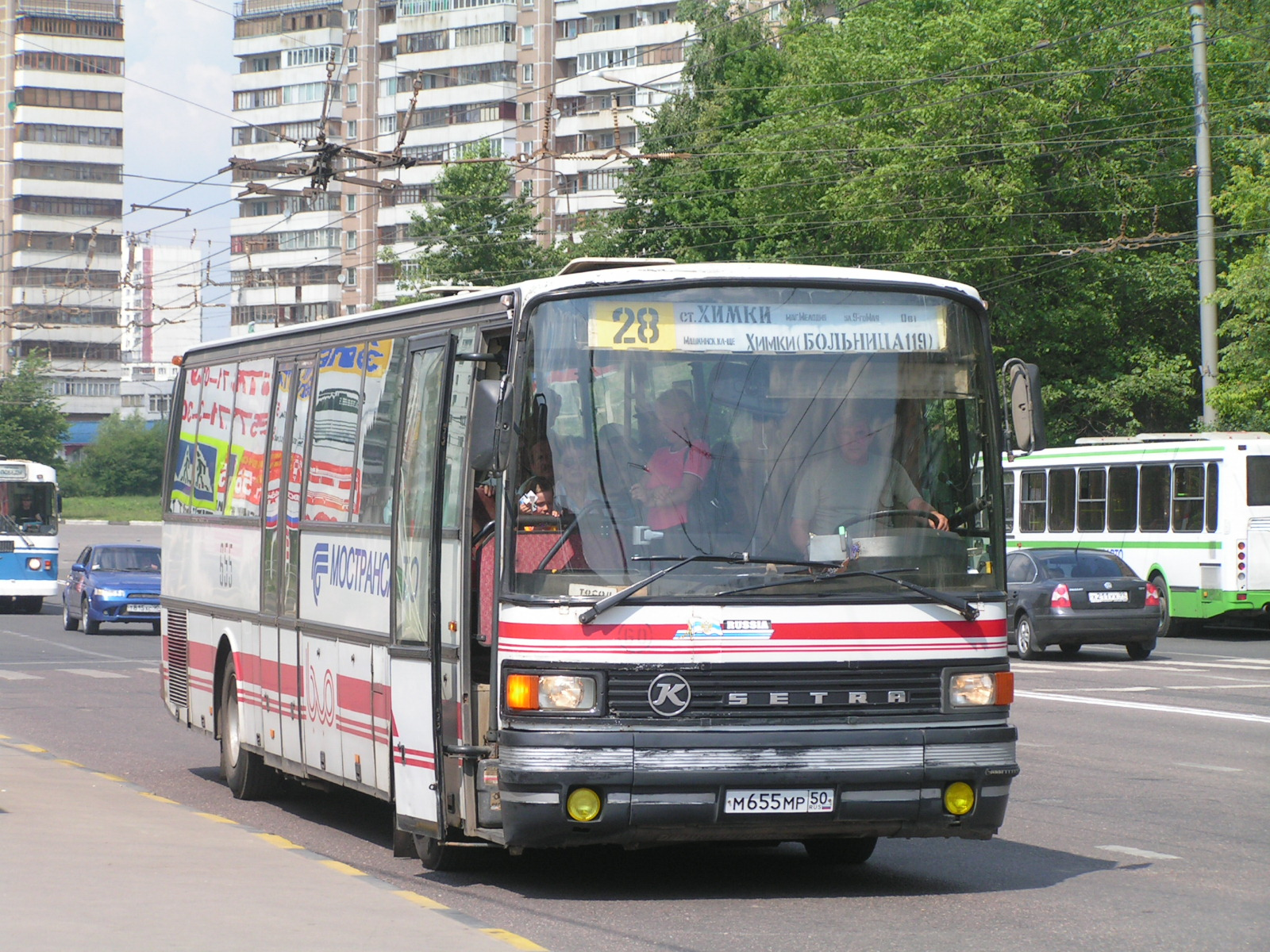
Setra bus

== Sport ==
- FC Khimki, association football club
- BC Khimki, basketball club
- WFC Rossiyanka, defunct women's association football club

== Divided city ==
Khimki

- at 1930 divided by Moscow Canal with right bank and left bank area and assigned "Levobereghnaya" (left bank) platform. The enter to M11 (Toll road) is also at left bank
- at 1961 part of the city transferred to Moscow includes Khimki hospital (known as "Stravinsky clinic" in Master and Margarita)
- Some Moscow organizations remained in Khimky like Moscow State Art and Cultural University and Arena Khimky (de facto)
- Skhodnya de jure merged but not adjustment to 2014. De facto Khimki, Skhodnya and the rest areas and enclaves were special fare zone earlier and this does not cause fare and legal collisions

== Twin towns – sister cities ==
Khimki is twinned with:

- Grodno, Belarus

== See also ==
- Khimki War Memorial
