= Vologda Mechanical Plant =

Russian machine company

- Native name: Вологодский механический завод
- Formerly: Trans-Alpha
- Company type: Joint Stock Company
- Founded: 1994; 32 years ago
- Headquarters: Belozerskoye highway, 3, Vologda, VLG, Russia
- Products: trolleybuses, electric buses
- Website: official site

Vologda Mechanical Plant since 2019 officially named Trans-Alpha is a Russian machine company located in the city of Vologda, specializing in the production of public vehicles: trolleybuses and buses. Managed by the Open Joint Stock Company "Trans-Alpha".

== History ==
=== 1994 ===
Corporatization "of the Vologda mechanical factory" (VMP), the adoption of strategic decisions about the development of the enterprise transport engineering, primarily trolleybusostroeniya.

=== 1996 ===
The result of cooperation with the Czech company Concern «Škoda Works» trolley was the release of the European level of the brand Škoda 14Tr M. For loans of the International Bank for Reconstruction and Development made their deliveries to Vologda and Novgorod.

=== 1997 ===
Created and put into serial production model trolley VMZ-170 with enhanced reliability and electrical safety.

=== 1999 ===
At an exhibition in Moscow, a first sample model trolley VMZ-263, which has significantly improved the body design, comfortable cabin for passengers and the driver's cab.

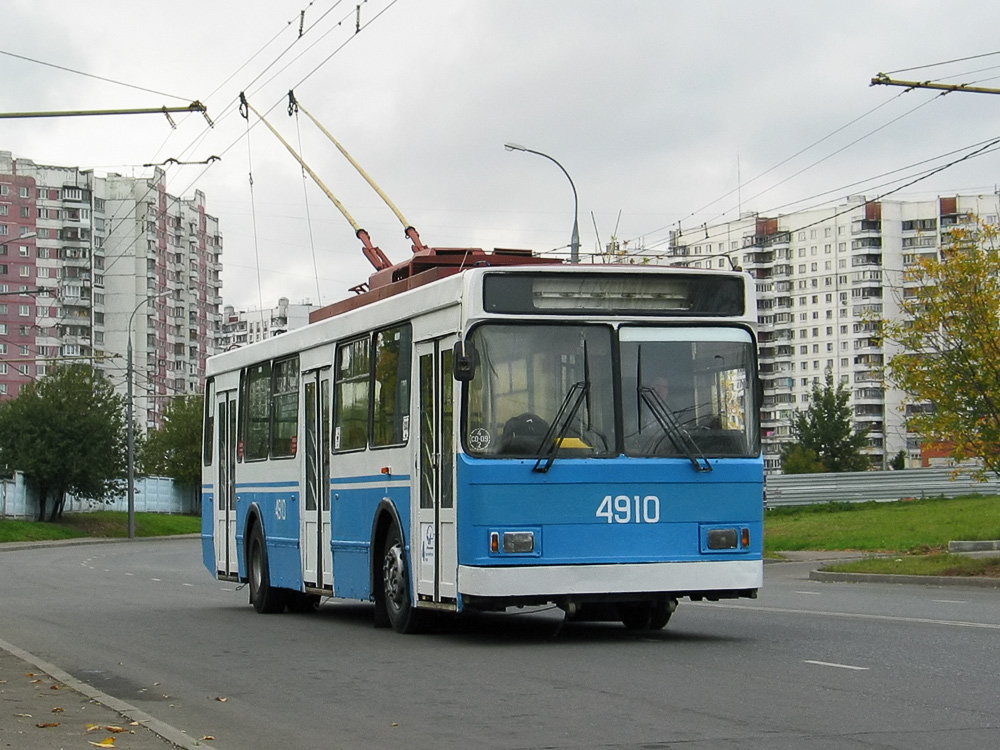
Trolley VMZ-5298 and Moscow

=== 2000 ===
Honorary Diploma of the Moscow international exhibition of industrial and urban transport "Promtrans-2000" is marked model trolley VSW-375. This model is certified under the number 5298. On the 2000 International Transport Exhibition in St. Petersburg, Russia in the first exhibited a model of low-floor trolleybuses.

=== 2001 ===
The exhibition "Promtrans-2001" is presented by the Vologda Trolley self ploy that can pass without catenary (wires) to three kilometers, saving energy when using up to forty percent. Created the first model of large buses, designed for urban and suburban transportation, certified under the number 5278. Currently, the bus model 5278 put into production. Put into operation production line assembly line for the production of trolleybuses and painting complex «SAIMA».

=== 2002 - 2005 ===
Russia's first low-floor trolleybus production of "Trans-Alpha", is recognized winner of the competition "100 best goods of Russia" (2002), and is noted for quality and compliance with international standards of transport used in the system of urban public transport, exhibition certificate "Mobility and urban transport", held in the framework of the 55th World Congress of the International Union of Public transport (Madrid, 2003).

This model is certified under the number 5298-01.
Put into production model of the articulated trolleybus 6215.
Put into production model of the articulated trolleybus 62151 low floor.

=== 2024 ===
From 2024, new trolleybuses are delivered to Volgograd and Yaroslavl.

== Geography of deliveries ==
Trolleys, manufactured by JSC "Trans-Alpha" has been exploited by Vologda, Moscow, St. Petersburg and 47 cities Russian Federation by Kaliningrad and to Beijing and also on Murmansk and to Makhachkala. There are companies in the asset and foreign delivery: Belgrade (Serbia and Montenegro) and Bratislava (Slovakia).

== Models ==
In 1996 the plant produced the trolley Škoda 14Tr, and in 1997 produced trolleybuses proprietary branded VSW. In 2008 it produced urban and suburban buses on chassis KamAZ under the name "Olympus".

- Škoda 14TrM (1996). Two-axle vysokopolny trolley large capacity. Assembly under license Škoda Transportation, Czech Republic. Delivered to Vologda, Novgorod, Belgorod
- VMZ-100 (1996 -?). Two-axle vysokopolny trolley large capacity . Analog ZiU-682V
- VMZ-170 (1997-?). Two-axle vysokopolny trolley large capacity . Modified ZiU-682 with electrical equipment on the roof, the production model
- VMZ-184 (2001 -?). Two-axle vysokopolny trolley large capacity. This is the only model in Novosibirsk
- VMZ-201 (2000 -?). Two-axle vysokopolny trolley large capacity. A new "square" body, 2 cars in Novosibirsk
- VMZ-263 (2000 -?). Two-axle vysokopolny trolley large capacity. This is the only model in Novosibirsk
- VMZ-273 (1999- ?). Two-axle vysokopolny trolley large capacity. This is the only model in the world operated in Izhevsk
- VMZ-5278 (2008- ?). Two-axle vysokopolny bus large capacity. Body is unified with the trolley model VMZ-5298
- VSW-5298 (VMP-375) (2000 -). Two-axle vysokopolny trolley large capacity production model trolley with a "square" body
- VMZ-5298.30AH (2001- ). Two-axle vysokopolny trolley large capacity. This model trolley with the function of an independent course on the capacitors to 3 km. in Vologda and Moscow
- VMZ-5298.01 (2000- ) - an experienced, from 2003 - serial. Two-axle low-floor trolley large capacity
- VMZ-5298.01-50 "Vanguard" (2007- ) - an experienced, from - serial. Two-axle low-floor trolley large capacity
- VMZ-6215 (2003 - an experienced, from 2005 - serial). Three-axle articulated vysokopolny trolley large capacity. The articulated trolleybus on the basis of VMZ-5298
- VMZ-62151 (2006 - an experienced, from 2007 - serial). Three-axle articulated low-floor trolley large capacity. The articulated trolleybus on the basis of VMZ- 5298.01. Asynchronous motor. Comes in Moscow.

== Gallery ==
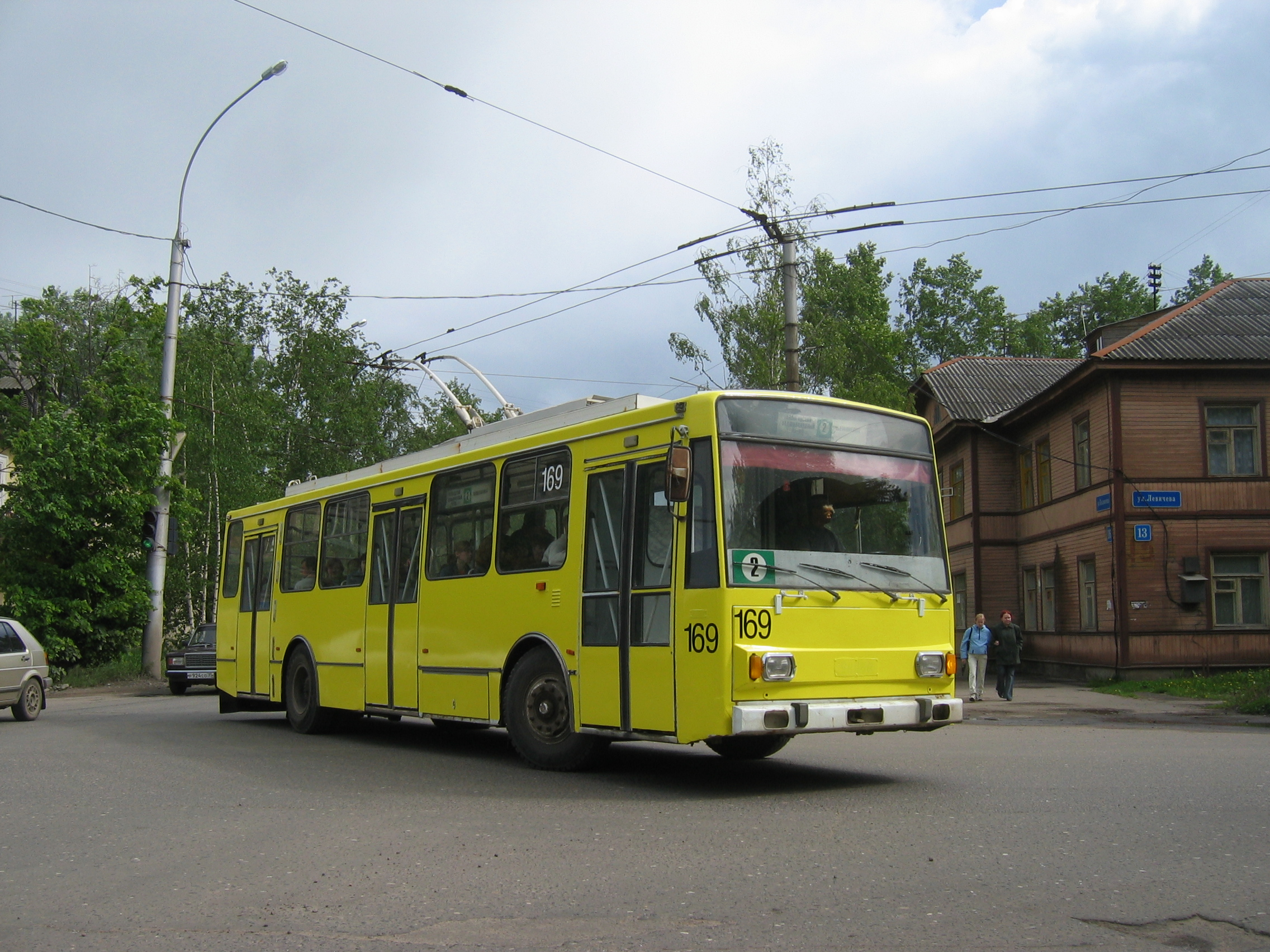
Škoda 14TrM

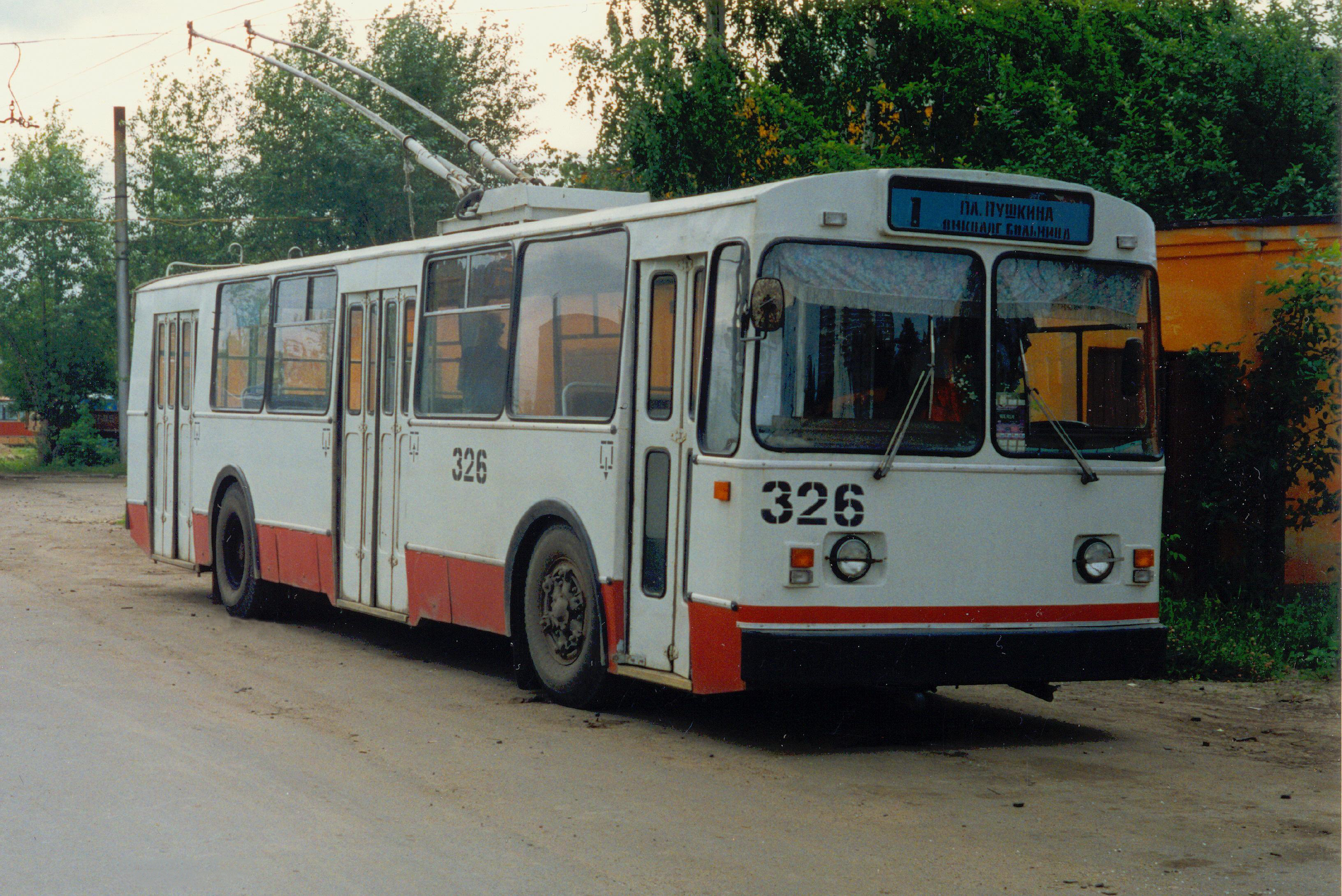
VMZ-100 in Ivanovo

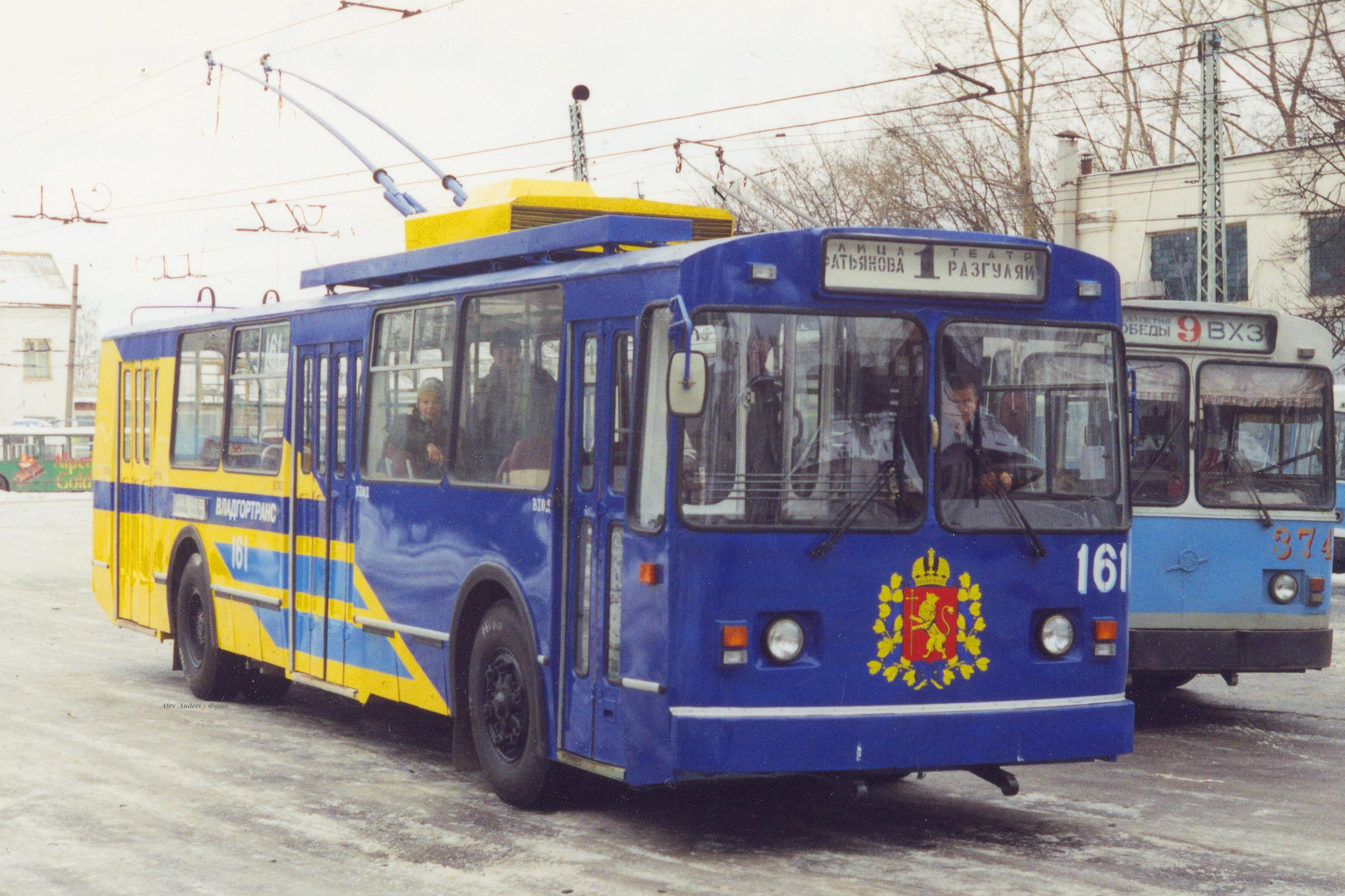
VMZ-170 in Vladimir

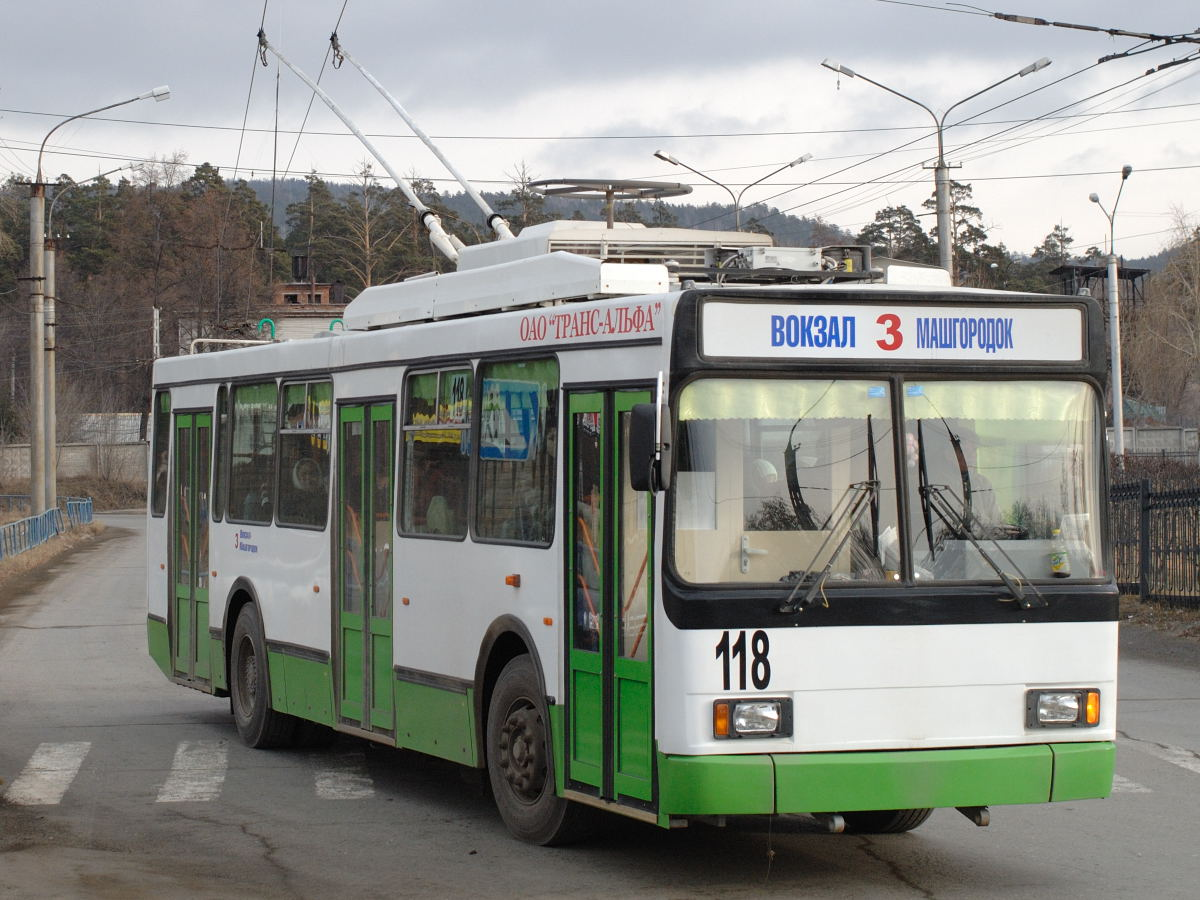
VMZ-5298 in Miass

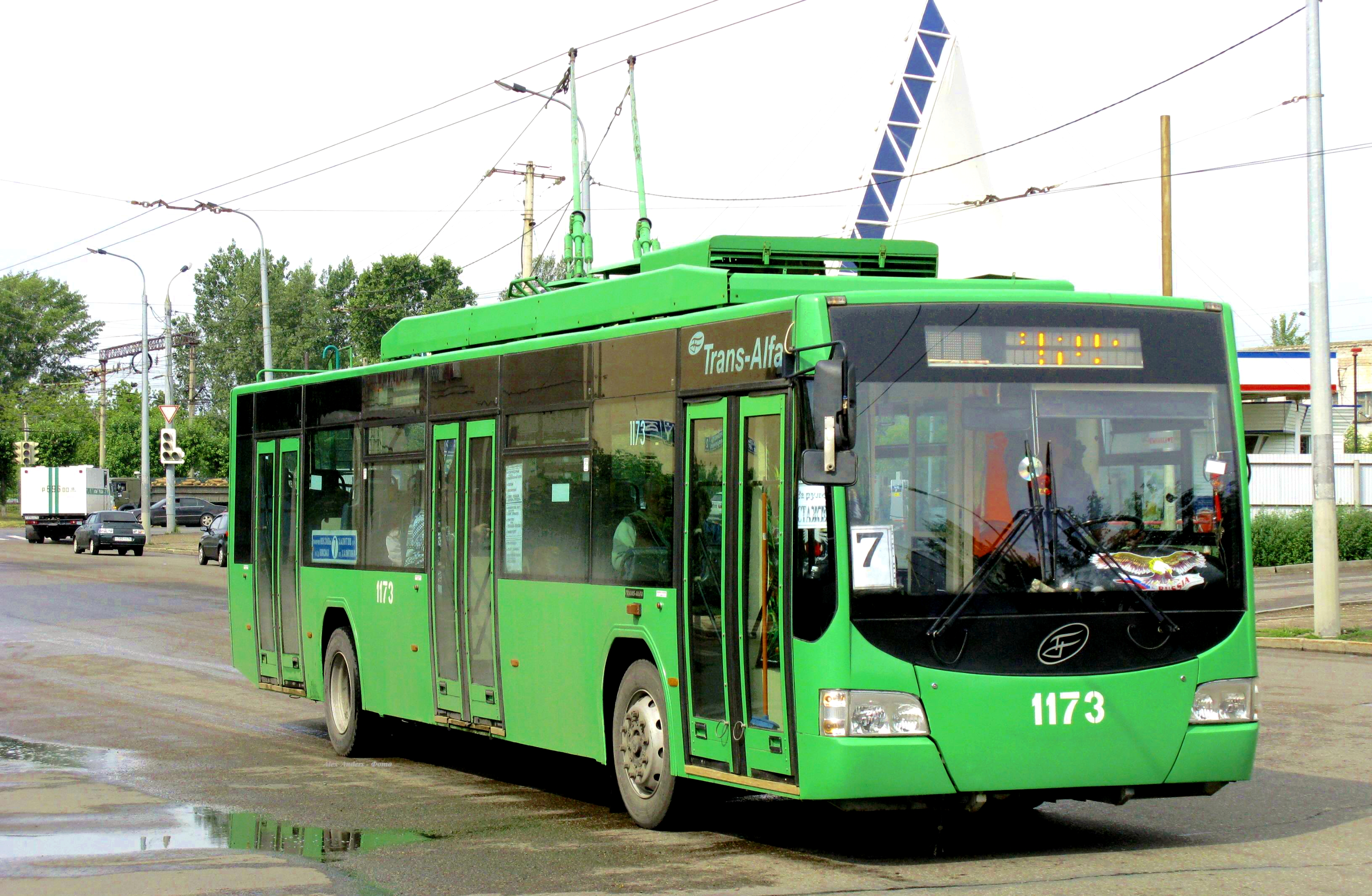
VMZ-5298.01 in Kazan

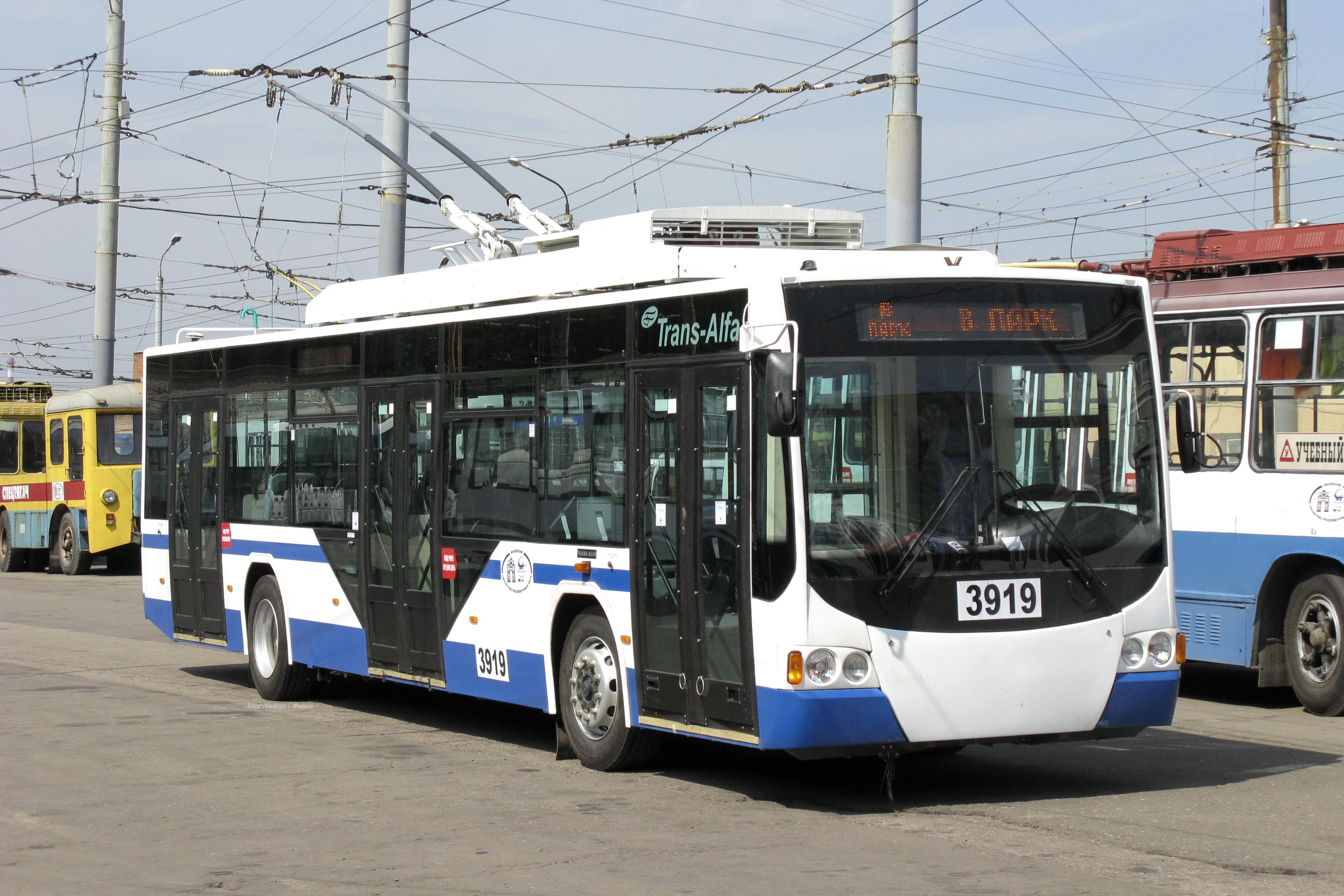
VMZ-5298.01-50 Vanguard in Moscow

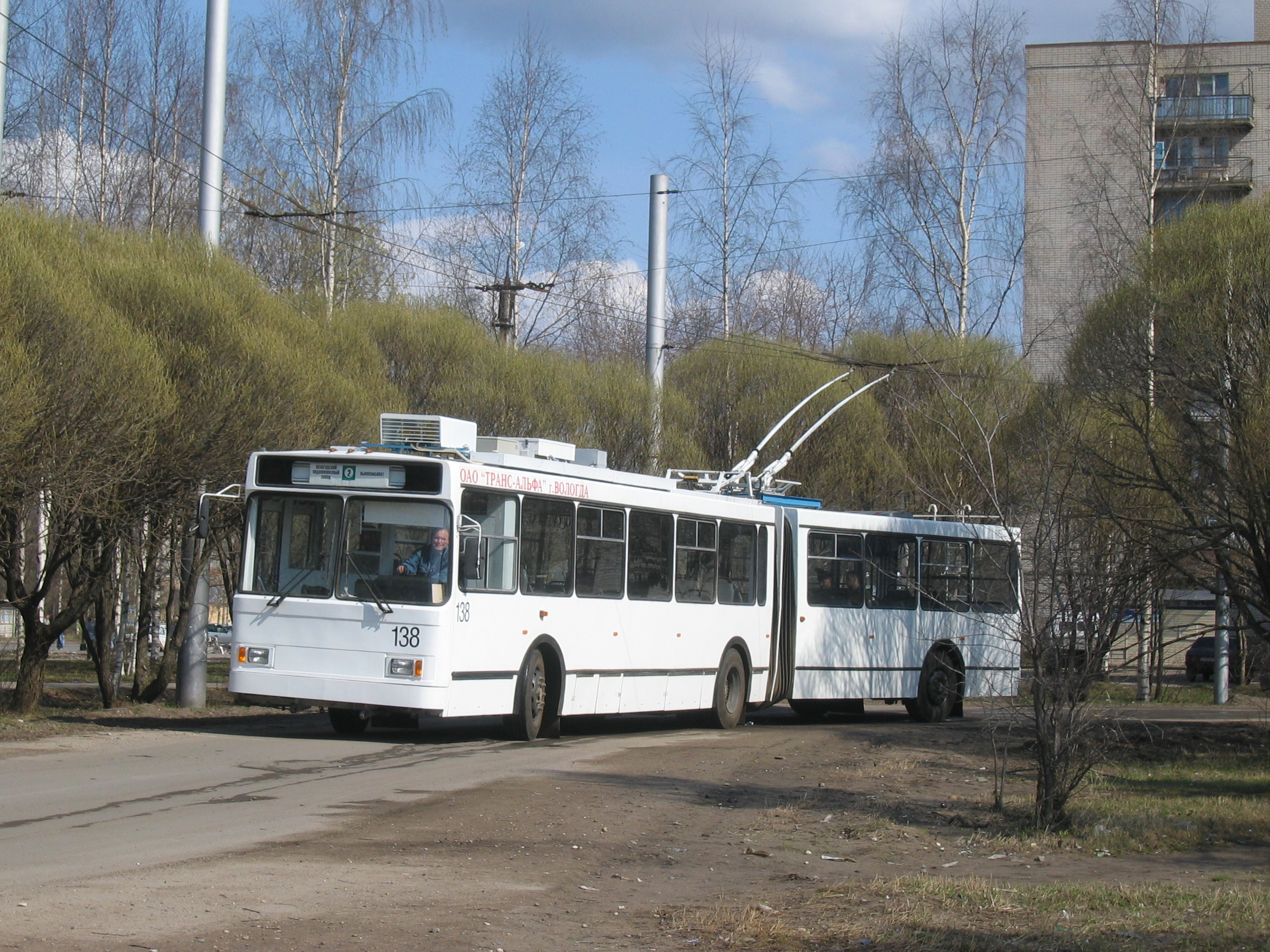
VMZ-6215 in Vologda

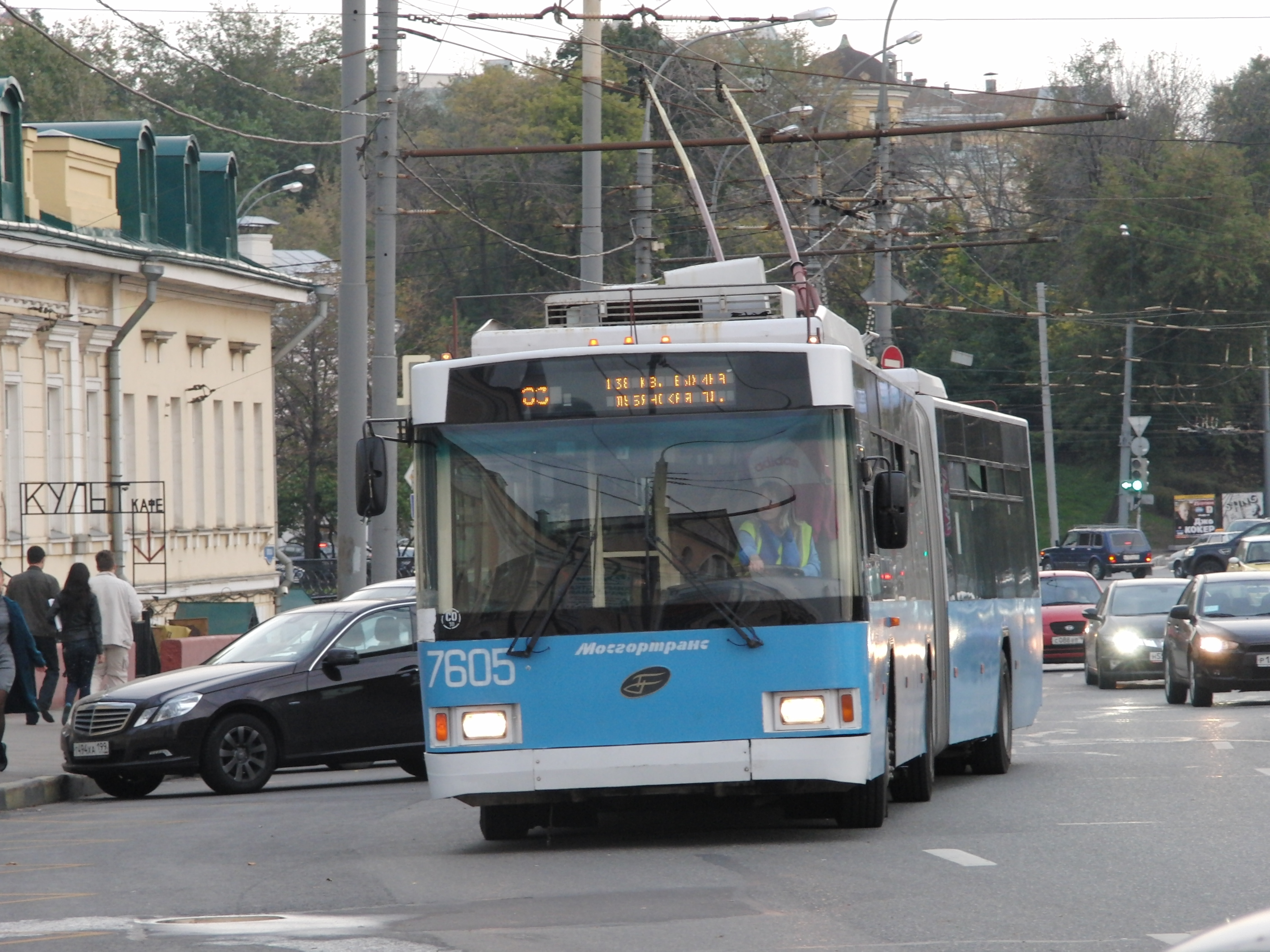
VMZ-62151 in Moscow

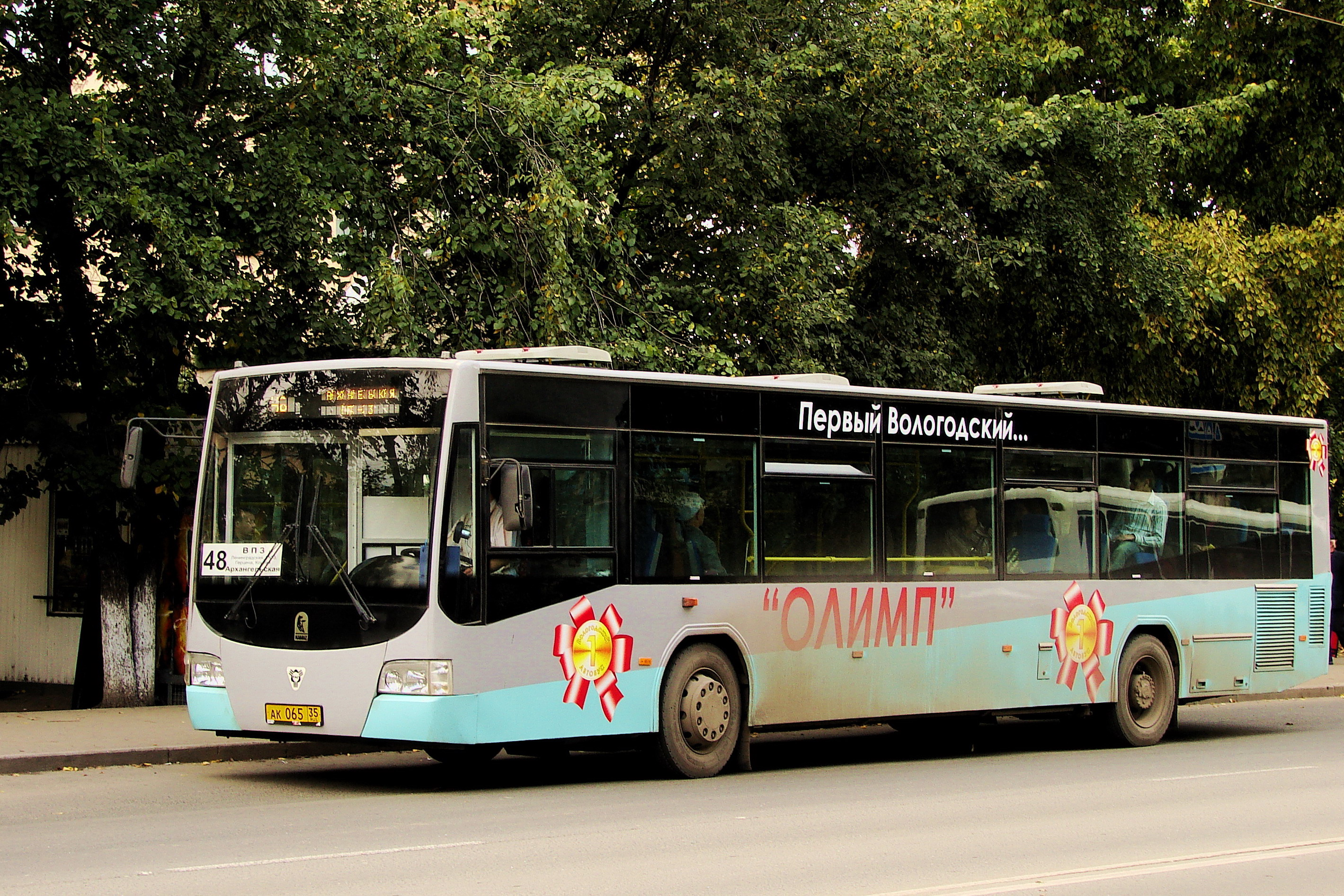
VMZ Olimp
