= Kyiv (trolleybus model) =

Kyiv (Ukrainian: Київ), previously known as KTB (Ukrainian: КТБ) for Kyivan Trolleybus (Ukrainian: Київський тролейбус), is a Soviet and Ukrainian trolleybus model originally designed by Kyiv Electric Transport Plant.

== KTB-1/Kyiv-2/Kyiv-4 (1960–1969) ==
KTB-1/Kyiv-2/Kyiv-4
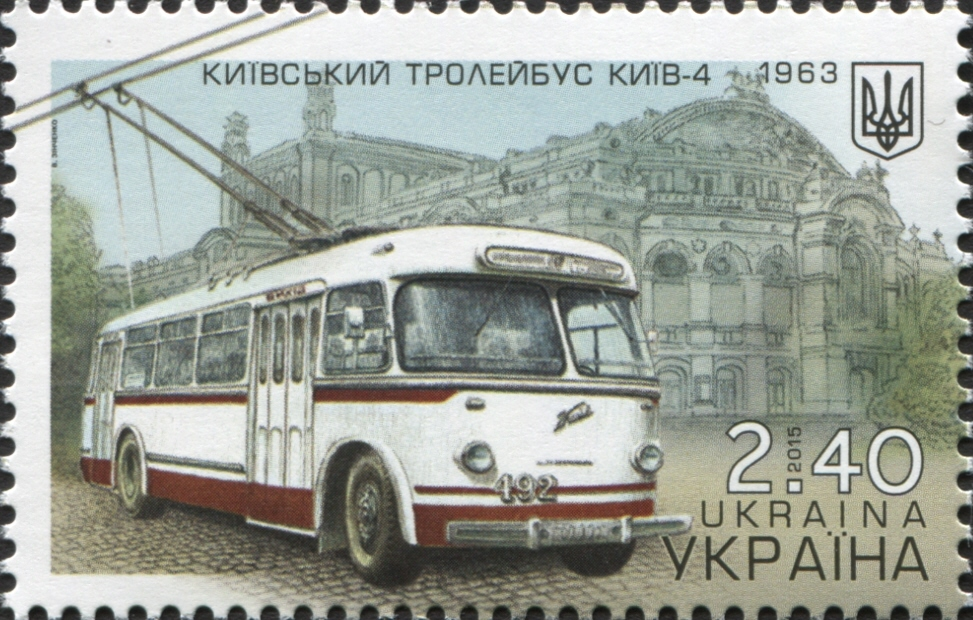
- KZET Kyiv-4 postal stamp

Overview
- Manufacturer: KZET
- Also called: KZET 2T
- Model years: 1960–1969
- Assembly: (Soviet Union) Kyiv, USSR (KZET)
- Designer: V. Seriohin

Body and chassis
- Class: Trolleybus
- Body style: Single-deck

Powertrain
- Electric motor: Dinamo DK-202B

Dimensions
- Wheelbase: 6,000 mm (19 ft 8 1/4 in)
- Length: 10,395 mm (34 ft 1 1/4 in)
- Width: 2,650 mm (8 ft 8 3/8 in)
- Height: 3,395 mm (11 ft 1 5/8 in)
- Curb weight: 9,600 kg (21,200 lb)

Chronology
- Predecessor: SVARZ TBES
- Successor: Kyiv-6

In 1950's KZET has been producing only SVARZ' trolleybuses until 1959 while attempting to design their own model. In 1958 constructor V. Seriohin designed a four-axle trolleybus KZET 4T concept but the idea was scrapped. In the beginning of 1960 KZET assembled the first trolleybus designed by themselves. The model was equipped with MAZ-200 truck axis and was called 2T. During the testing the front overhang was proved to be too large, severely overloading the front axis. Due to this defect the serial production never started so the plant began to work on the second prototype.

Next month KZET assembled the 2Tu trolleybus that was a shortened version of 2T and used a lot of parts from Moscow's MTB-82. The model turned out more successful than its predecessor and in the autumn of 1960 the plant began assembling its production version, 2Tm that later became known as KTB-1. The production version received four-piece front window instead of two. The trolleybuses had thinner seats on the left side and wider seats on the right side.

First units had a four-panel doors separated in the middle, the same as MTV-82 trams, however with time they had been proved inconvenient. Starting from 1962 the assembly of the KTB-1A (also known as Kyiv-2) began, its doors were installed on the opposite sides from each other, the body had more rounded shape and the front window was a two-piece now.

Also in 1962 KZET began working on a new modification of their trolleybus. In 1963 they assembled the first unit of Kyiv-4 that had larger front and rear windows, more plastic parts and instead of couches received a more modern single seats, one row on the left side and two rows on the right side. For several years Kyiv-2 and Kyiv-4 had been in production simultaneously until the older one got discontinued in 1964. Late units had their route indicator shortened to only fit the number. Kyiv-4 has been in production until 1969, KZET replaced it with their new model, Kyiv-6.

Originally the first generation of Kyiv trolleybuses were only intended for service on Kyiv's trolleybus system but in the middle of 1960's they began to be produced for other cities of Ukrainian SSR. The trolleybuses stayed in service until 1977 and were proven to be rather unreliable with chassis prone to rust and the engine being underpowered and incapable of working at steep surfaces, the latter defect forced Kyiv-2 from working at Crimean mountain route early on.

The two last surviving units of Kyiv-2 and Kyiv-4 were restored and preserved by Moscow Public Transport Museum in the 1990's.

=== Modifications ===
- KZET 2T (1960) — first prototype
- KZET 2Tu (1960) — second prototype
- KZET 2Tm/KTB-1 (1960–1962) — production version
- KTB-1A/Kyiv-2 (1962–1964) — first facelift
- Kyiv-4 (1963–1969) — second facelift

=== Gallery ===
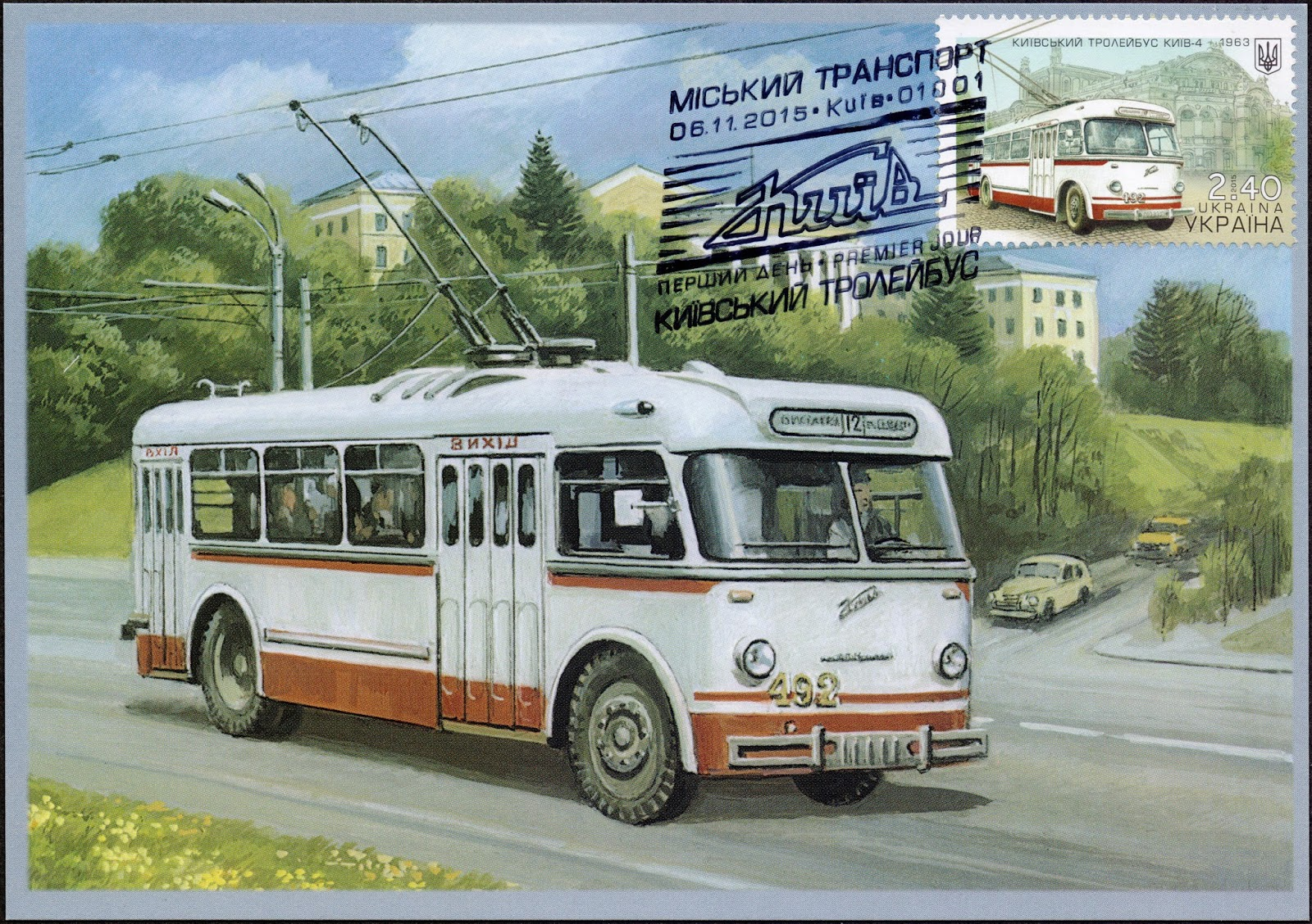
Kyiv-4 postcard

== Kyiv-3 (1961–1963) ==
In 1961 KZET also modernized the SVARZ TBES trolleybuses previously produced by them after the tour trolleybus model was proven to be incapable of working in the city. After the modernization they were getting rebadged as Kyiv-3, making them a part of the plant's new lineup.

== Kyiv-5LA (1963) ==
The production of a trolleybus model based on LAZ-695 in 1963 was transferred from Lviv's LAZ to Kyiv with a plan of supplying Ukrainian cities. KZET renamed the model from LAZ-695T to Kyiv-5LA and assembled 75 units but the production in Kyiv was proven to be insufficient and was transferred once again, now to Odesa's OdAZ.

== Kyiv-6 (1968–1974) ==
Kyiv-6

Overview
- Manufacturer: KZET
- Model years: 1968–1973
- Assembly: (Soviet Union) Kyiv, USSR (KZET)
- Designer: V. Mishakin; A. Bannik

Body and chassis
- Class: Trolleybus
- Body style: Single-deck

Powertrain
- Electric motor: Dinamo DK-207G1

Dimensions
- Wheelbase: 5,800 mm (19 ft 3/8 in)
- Length: 11,570 mm (37 ft 11 1/2 in)
- Width: 2,600 mm (8 ft 6 3/8 in)
- Height: 3,325 mm (10 ft 10 7/8 in)
- Curb weight: 10,000 kg (22,000 lb)

Chronology
- Predecessor: Kyiv-4
- Successor: Kyiv-11

In 1965 KZET's chief designer V. Mishakin and a team of engineers from Kyiv and students from Kharkiv began to work on a new generation of Kyiv trolleybuses that would be larger and more technically advanced compared to the previous one. In 1966 they've assembled a first prototype that became the second Soviet trolleybus with three doors (after ZiU-5). The model was using the already successful technology from its predecessor and Škoda 9Tr. Trolleybus' chassis used axis from MAZ-500. To fix the flaws of the previous models Kyiv-6 was equipped with power steering and a more powerful engine also used on ZiU-5. The interior had four rows of seats and a bigger windows. From March 1 to September 1968, after the work on it was finished, the experimental model has been undergoing tests on Kyiv's 8th trolleybus route.

Later in 1968 the assembly of a production version of Kyiv-6 called Kyiv-6A has started, making it the first ever three-door trolleybus to enter serial production in the USSR. The serial variant had an improved interior design and since 1969 began to be equipped with Hungarian axis made by RÁBA.

In 1967–1969, after researching the ABB thyristor drive system, KZET designed their own one. The system was approved after being tested on Škoda 9Tr and began to be installed on a new modification of Kyiv-6 called Kyiv-6T which became the first thyristor drive trolleybus in Eastern Europe. In 1972 KZET made an improved version of the system and tested it on one of Kharkiv's ZiU-9, there had been plans on further development of it for Kyiv-6 trolleybuses and Tatra T3 trams but the project didn't get financing and all the work on it has been halted.

Kyiv-6 stayed in production until 1974. Its units has been in service until the mid-1980's, with time all of them were scrapped. The remains of the last surviving Kyiv-6 had been used as a shed by Lutsk trolleybus depot until 2011.

=== Modifications ===
- Kyiv-6 (1966) — prototype
- Kyiv-6A (1968–1969) — production version
- Kyiv-6T (1969–1973) — ABB thyristor drive version

== Kyiv-7 (cancelled) ==
There had been plans of designing a new trolleybus model called Kyiv-7, the design process had started but was cancelled after the production of Soviet public transport moved exclusively to Russian SFSR. Since then KZET had moved to trolleytrucks production to supply various cities of Soviet Union until its collapse.

== Kyiv-8 (1965) ==
In 1965 KZET assembled their first trolleytruck designed by UkrNDIProekt. It was based on a Georgian semi-trailer truck KAZ-606A Kolkhida and was planned to be used in freight transportation in Crimea. Only one prototype has been built before the work on its development stopped due to the end of truck's production. The only unit was received by Simferopol where it never worked because it didn't have a fitting trailer, later it given away to Sevastopol where it was converted into a box truck.

== KTG (1972–1991) ==
KTG
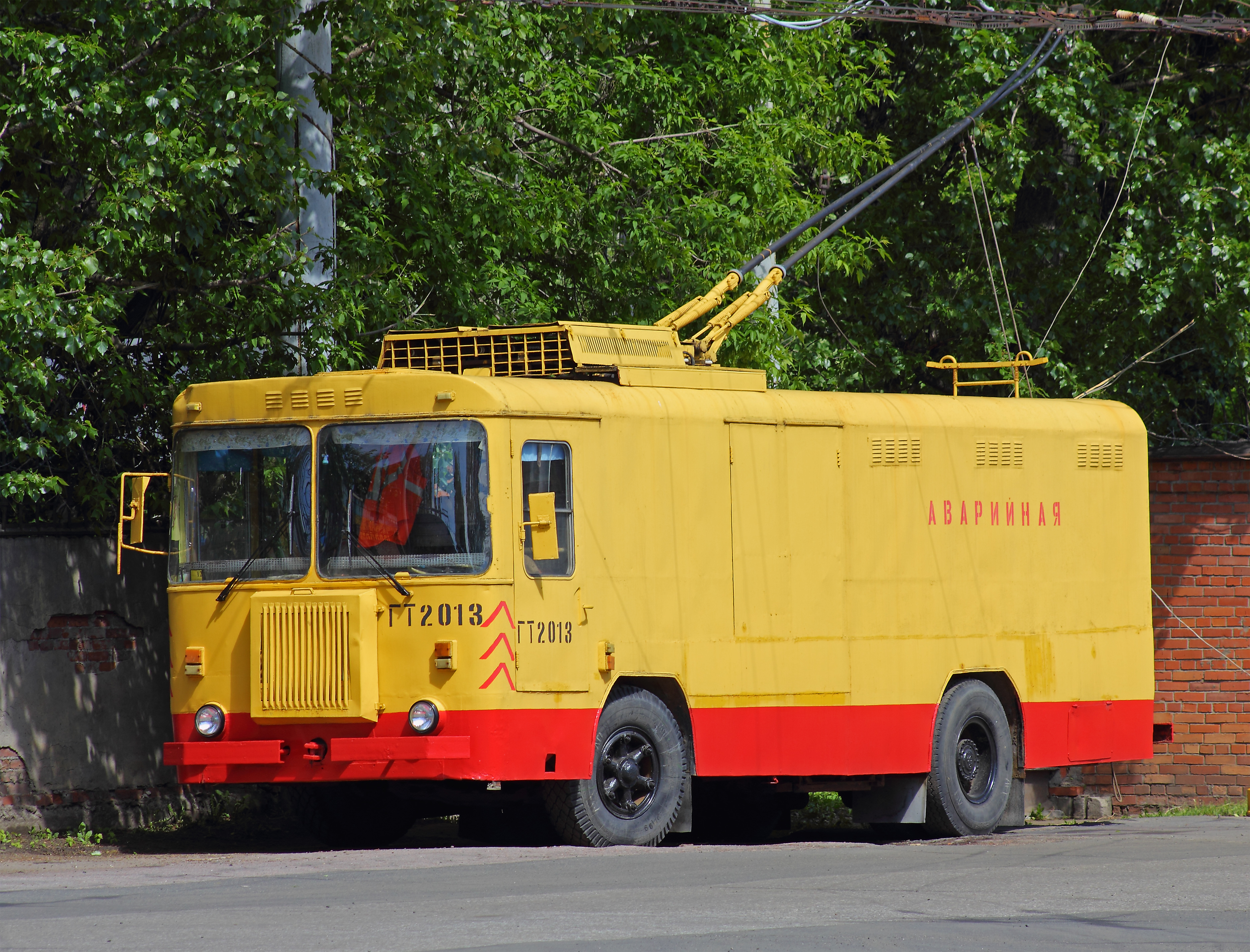
- KTG-1 in St. Petersburg

Overview
- Manufacturer: KZET
- Model years: 1972–1991
- Assembly: (Soviet Union) Kyiv, USSR (KZET)

Body and chassis
- Class: Trolleytruck

Dimensions
- Wheelbase: 3,700 mm (12 ft 1 5/8 in)
- Length: 9,790 mm (32 ft 1 3/8 in)
- Width: 2,500 mm (8 ft 2 3/8 in)
- Height: 3,115 mm (10 ft 2 5/8 in); 3,165 mm (10 ft 4 5/8 in)
- Curb weight: 8,000 kg (18,000 lb)

In 1970's KZET designed a series of hybrid trolleytrucks that could run on both electricity and diesel. The trucks would've been used by technicians of trolleybus depots for towing the broken units and grocery stores for goods delivery. The model was called 'Киевский троллейбус грузовой' ('Kyiv Trolleybus Freight' in Russian) and was put into serial production in 1972.

The first modification of KTG was a box truck, in later years open bed truck and street sweeper has been put into production. There were various modification planned but they were either produced in single prototype unit or being left as a cancelled project. The trolleytrucks were widely supplied in different Soviet republics, however with time it was getting outdated and also Kyiv was about to need its own passenger trolleybuses, so the production was stopped in 1991.

=== Modifications ===
- KTG-1 (1972–1991) — box truck
- KTG-2 (1976–1991) — open bed truck
- KTG-3 (cancelled) — mobile buffet
- KTG-4 (1976–1990) — cargo-passenger truck
- KTG-5 (cancelled) — mobile workshop
- KTG-6 (1984–1991) — street sweeper
- KTG-7 (cancelled) — trailer truck
- KTG-8 (cancelled) — refrigerated truck
- KTG-9 (1988) — dump truck

=== Gallery ===
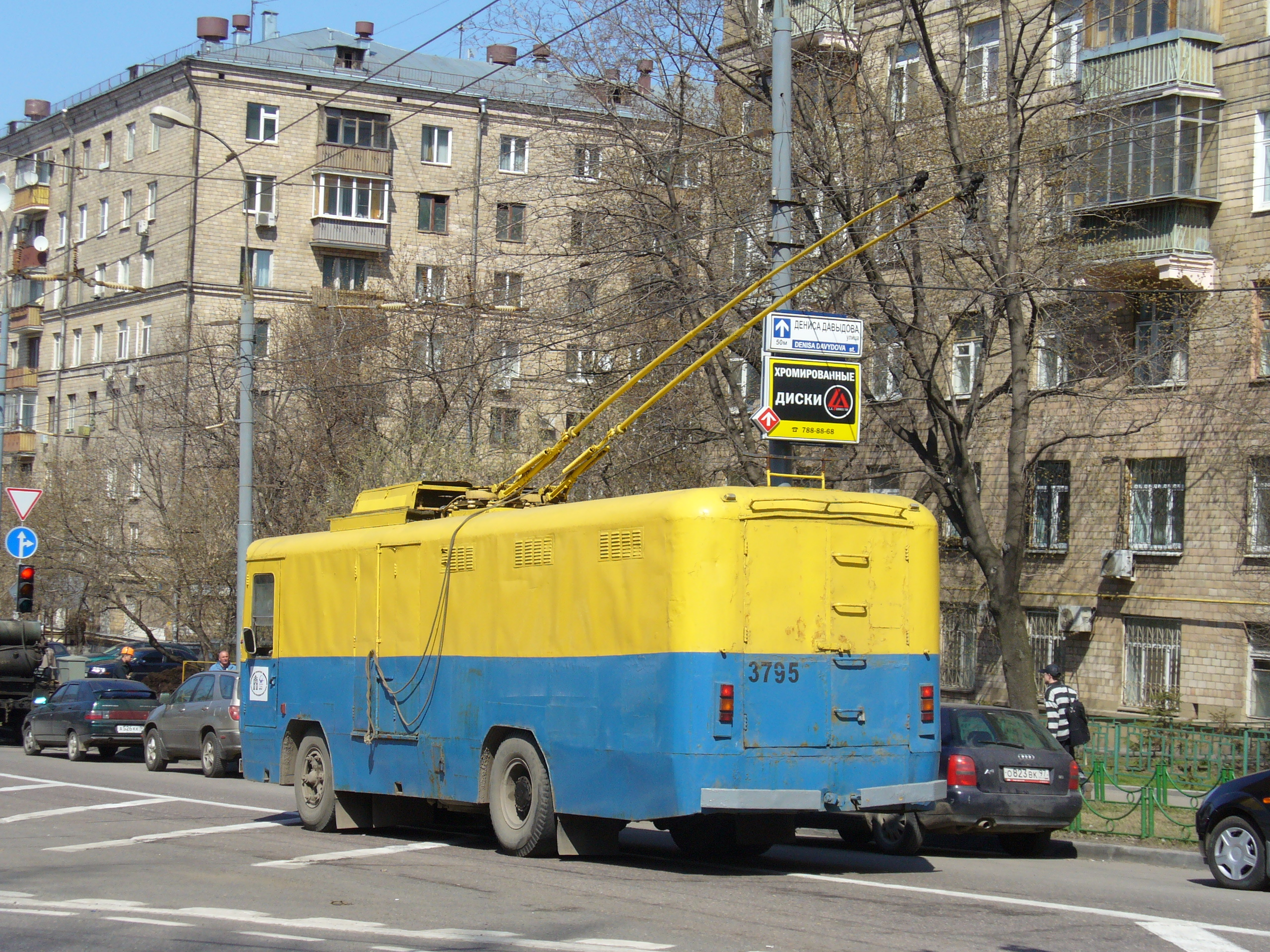
KTG-1 in Moscow

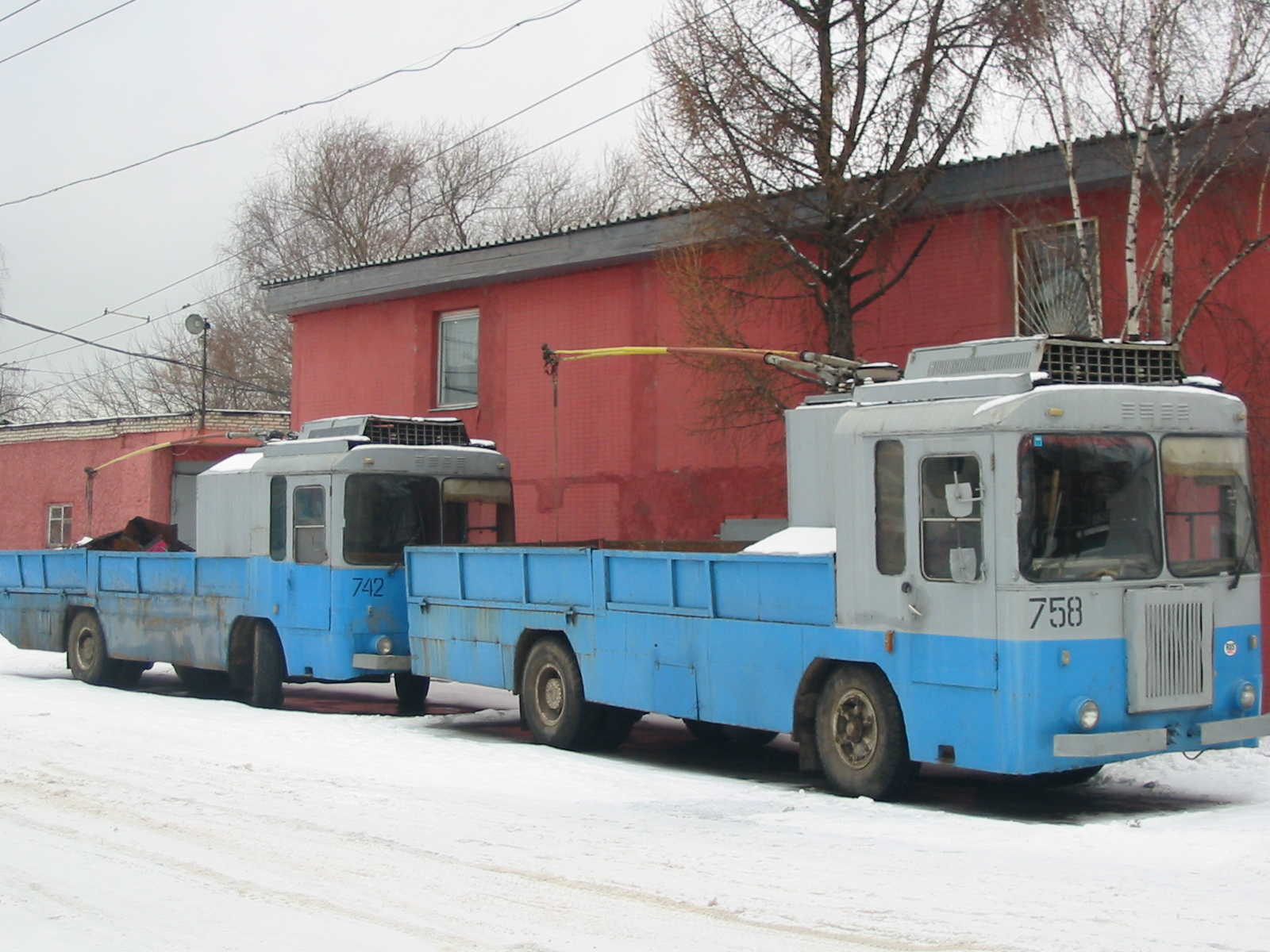
KTG-2 in Moscow

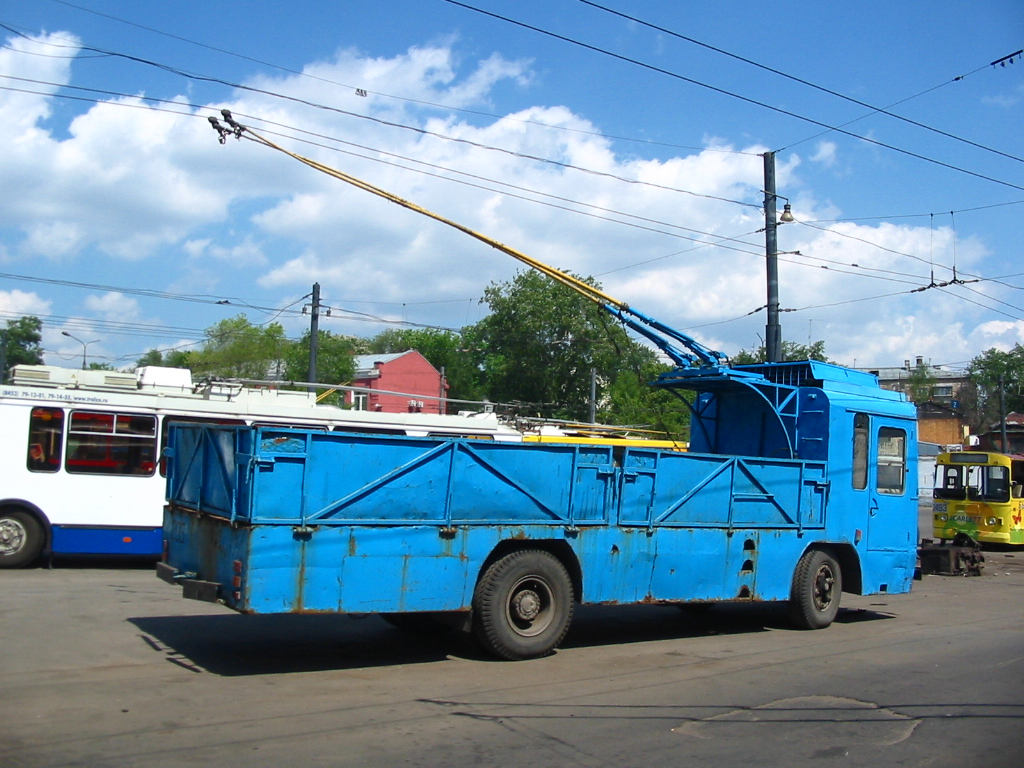
KTG-2 in Moscow

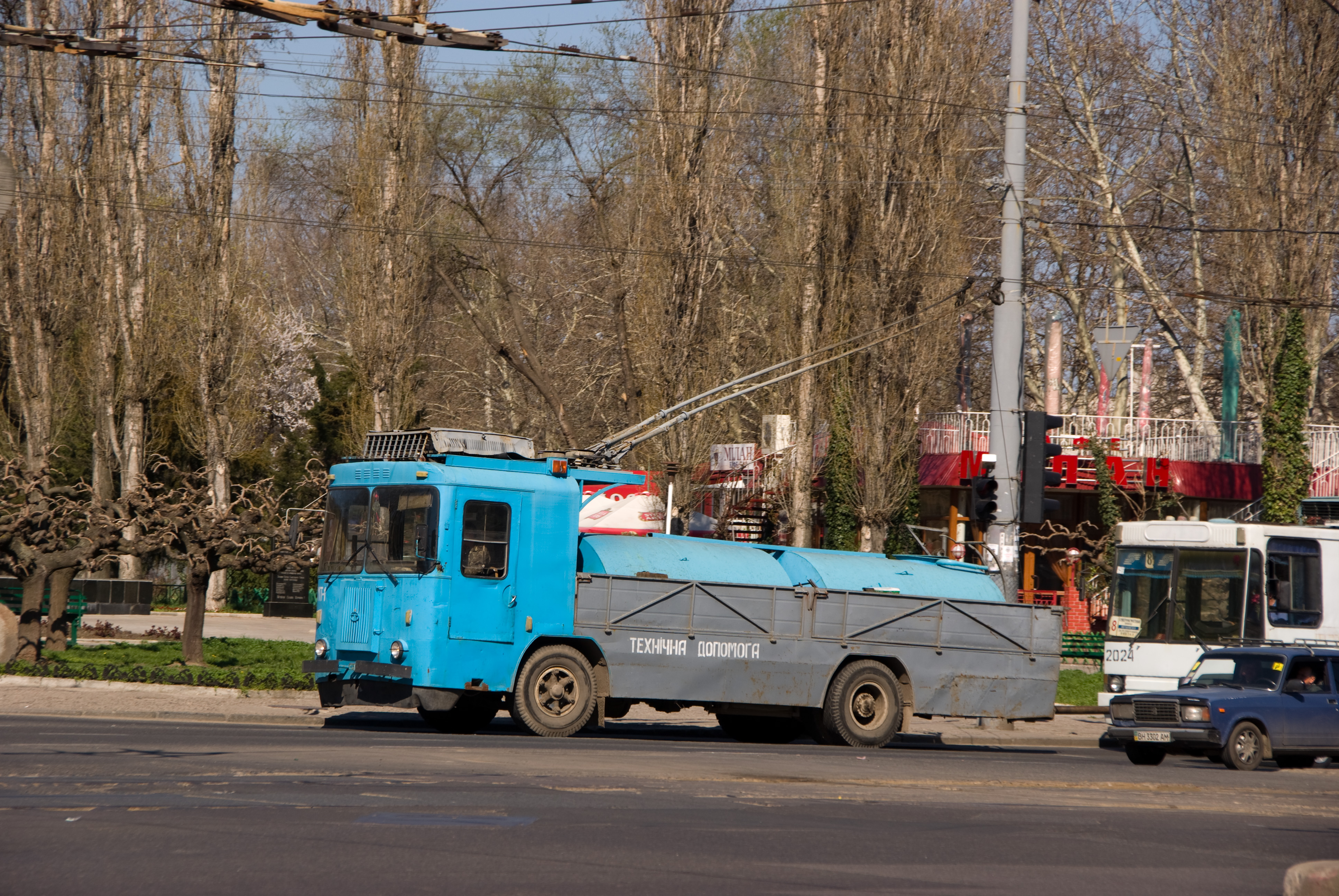
KTG-6 in Odesa

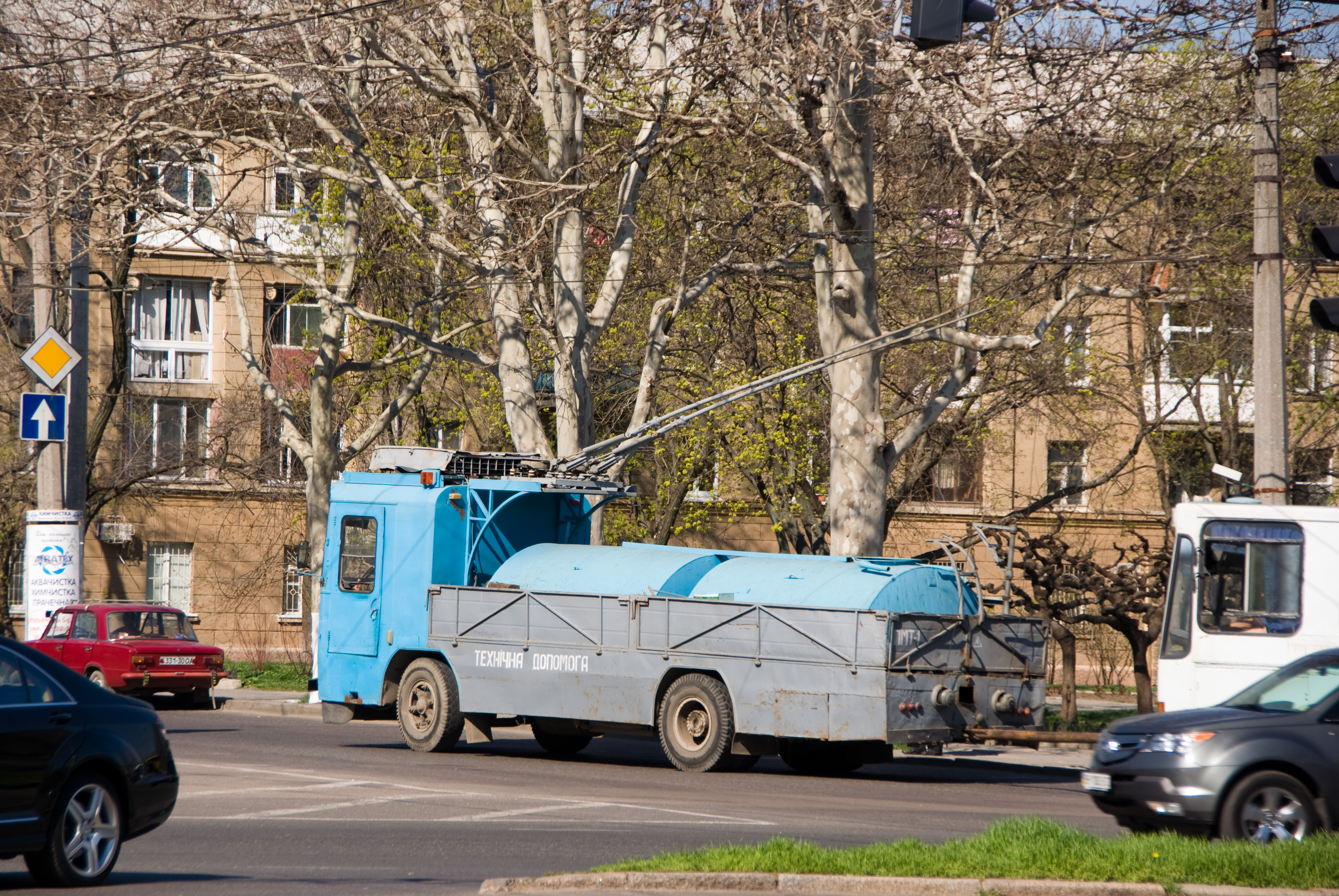
KTG-6 in Odesa

== Kyiv-10 (cancelled) ==
Since 1970's Kyiv was supplied by Škoda trolleybuses from Czechoslovakia, as well as Romanian Rocar in the late 1980's, however in the final years of Soviet Union it was getting hard to purchase foreign transport so it was decided to renew the work on passenger trolleybuses at KZET. The project of Kyiv-10 has been completed in 1991, when the USSR has just got dissolved. The model was planned to have automatic stairs at the first door that would come down when it opens. The project was deemed too expensive and cancelled in favor of copying Škoda 15Tr.

== Kyiv-11/YuMZ T1/T2 (1991–2008) ==
Kyiv-11/YuMZ T1/T2
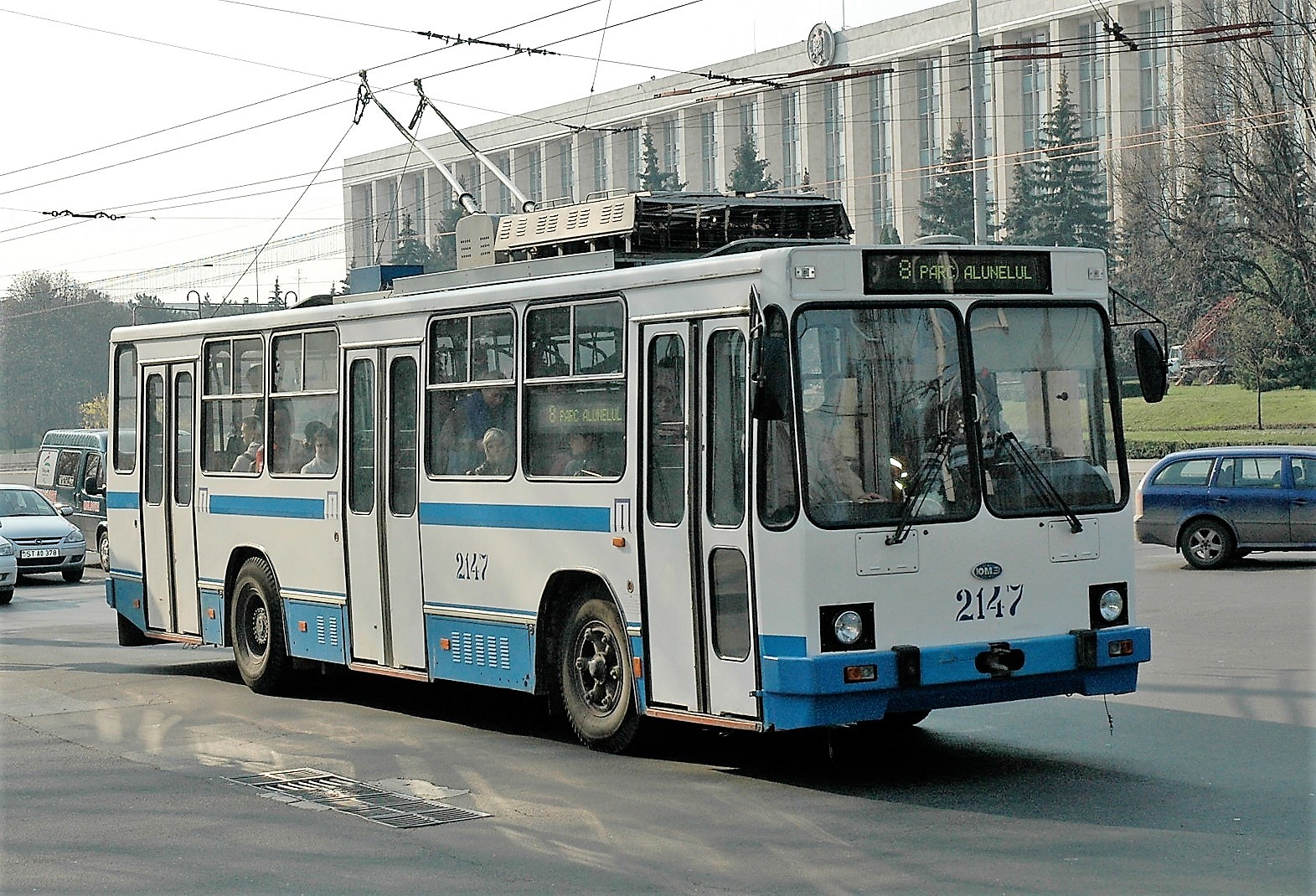
- YuMZ T2 in Chișinău

Overview
- Manufacturer: KZET; Pivdenmash
- Also called: Kyiv-10
- Model years: 1991–2011, 2022
- Assembly: Kyiv, Ukraine (KZET); Minsk, Belarus (BKM); Dnipropetrovsk, Ukraine (YuMZ); Pavlohrad, Ukraine (PMZ)
- Designer: Volodymyr Veklych; Mykhailo Halahas

Body and chassis
- Class: Trolleybus
- Body style: Single-deck

Powertrain
- Electric motor: Dinamo DK-213B (Kyiv-11/11u); ETM ED138U2 (YuMZ T1); ETM ED138AU2 (YuMZ T2, 93–00); ETM ED139AU2 (YuMZ T2, 00–08)

Dimensions
- Wheelbase: 6,520 mm (21 ft 4 3/4 in) (axis 1-2); 5,400 mm (17 ft 8 5/8 in) (axis 2-3)
- Length: 18,000 mm (59 ft 5/8 in) (11/T1); 11,630 mm (38 ft 1 7/8 in) (11u/T2)
- Width: 2,500 mm (8 ft 2 3/8 in)
- Height: 3,355 mm (11 ft 1/8 in)

Chronology
- Predecessor: Kyiv-6
- Successor: Kyiv-12; YuMZ E186

In 1991 KZET designed an articulated Kyiv-11 and shortened Kyiv-11u. The following year Belarussian company Belkamunmash got a licence to assemble the trolleybuses in Minsk for local market. Due to the poor financial state of Kyiv Electric Transport Plant the new model had outdated technology and wasn't reliable. Because of that it was decided to transfer the production to another company in different city, the chosen company was Pivdenmash (or YuMZ) from Dnipropetrovsk (now Dnipro). YuMZ used to produce spacecraft, weapons and farming vehicles however after the fall of USSR it struggled due to lack of state customs and needed to find more financially stable industry in 90's Ukraine. With cities increasing demand for new public transport, the plant takes over the assembly of Kyiv-11 in 1992 renaming it to YuMZ T1 and Kyiv-11u renaming it to YuMZ T2. KZET ended the production of Kyiv-11 in 1992 (except for two units made in Belarus in 1993 and 1996), while Kyiv-11u, being more successful model, has been assembled until 1995.

At Pivdenmash engineers Volodymyr Veklych and Mykhailo Halahas modified the design of the models. Aside from minor exterior alterations, Moscow made Dinamo electronic parts has been replaced by ones made in Kharkiv and Poltava. The first series of YuMZ T1 has been assembled in Dnipropetrovsk from January 1992 to 1993. The second series assembly had started in 1993 already at two Pivdenmash plants, YuMZ in Dnipropetrovsk and PMZ in Pavlohrad, the series received bigger windows. Trolleybuses made in Pavlohrad had worse contactor panel than the ones from the main plant and didn't have a standardized color scheme while Dnipropetrovsk ones were white with either blue or gray lines. Since 1995 the doors on YuMZ trolleybuses no longer had two windows but only one on top except for the front doors, also the models from both plants received a single livery, white with two blue lines. T1 has been exported to Belarussian Minsk, Russian Orenburg and Estonian Tallinn.

In 1993 several shortened trolleybuses were built for testing. Unlike the articulated ones, they've had only one motor instead of two. Next year Pivdenmash attempted to start equipping their trolleybuses with thyristors instead of rheostats, assembling one short YuMZ T2M in 1994 and one articulated YuMZ T3K in 1995, but due to lack of experience both were left as one-offs. In 1996 the trolleybus production was transferred exclusively to Pavlohrad. After the complaints on high energy consumption the assembly of the articulated trolleybuses was stopped in 1998, the last units were received by Zhytomyr. Also in 1998 YuMZ trolleybuses received the power inverters and a production of a more powerful T2.09 modification started for Crimean trolleybus route. In 2000 YuMZ T2 got new motor and new lights, the front mask design has been simplified. In 2005 TV Progress control system began to be installed on YuMZ trolleybuses, the modification was named T2.07. In 2006 the trolleybuses got new wheels and interior. The serial production of YuMZ T2 had stopped in 2008. The model had been exported to Turkmenistan (Ashgabat), Russia (Moscow and Rostov-on-Don) and Moldova (Chișinău).

After the end of production some units stayed unfinished in Pavlohrad and in later years they were either finished and sent to cities in small batches or used in modernization of YuMZ T1 that after shortening were receiving either T2P or T1R nameplate. YuMZ trolleybuses had been preserved in museums of Kyiv, Moscow and Chișinău. The only Kyiv-11u that was attempted to be preserved was a unit from Kyiv that was given to Kremenchuk in 1998, in 2009 it has been exhibited in the Peace Park but due to it staying outdoors for a long time its state has worsened and the trolleybus was scrapped in 2013.

=== Modifications ===
- Kyiv-11 (1991–1993, 1996) — articulated version
- YuMZ T1 (1992–1998, 2011) — updated articulated version
- YuMZ T3K (1995) — thyristor drive articulated prototype
- Kyiv-11u (1991–1995) — short version
- YuMZ T2 (1993–2011, 2022) — updated short version
- YuMZ T2M (1994) — thyristor drive short prototype
- YuMZ T2.09 (1998–1999, 2003–2005, 2007) — short version with power inverter
- YuMZ T2.07 (2003, 2005–2008, 2010) — short version with TV Progress

=== Gallery ===
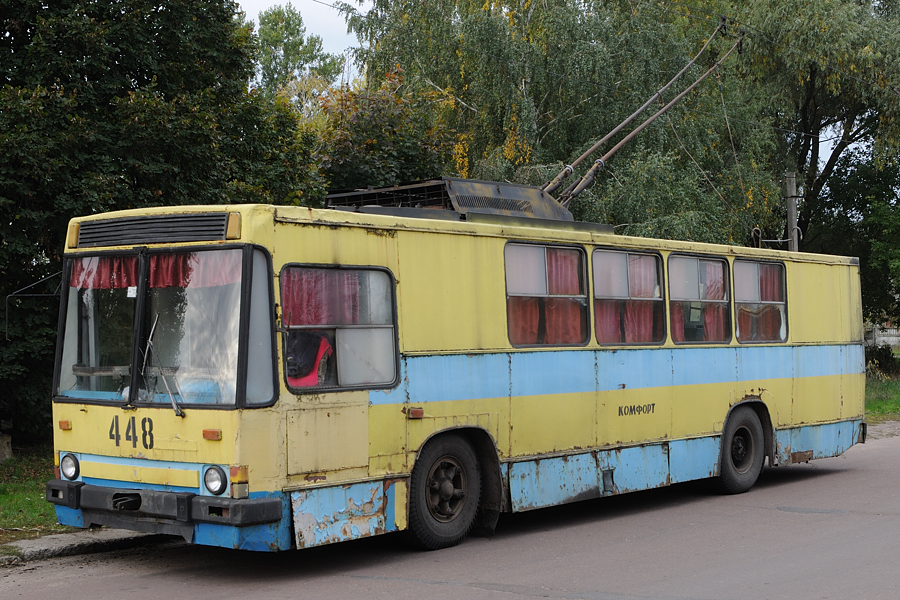
Kyiv-11u, converted into a technical trolleybus, in Chernihiv

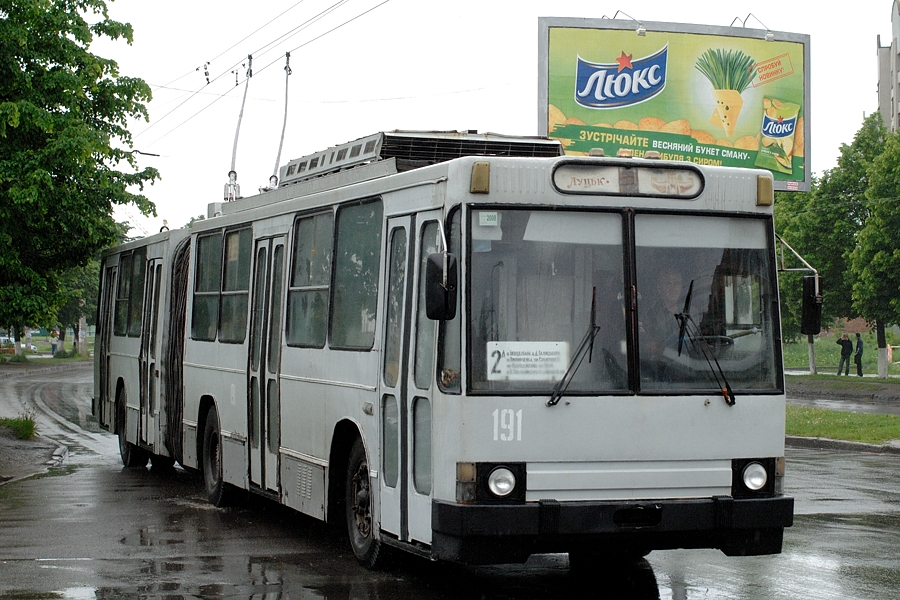
YuMZ T1 in Lutsk

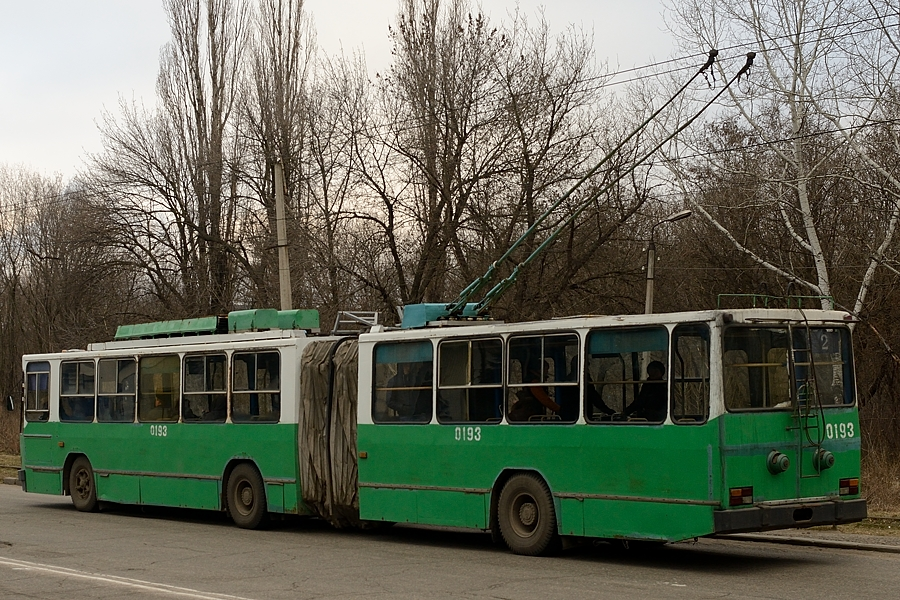
YuMZ T1 in Kramatorsk

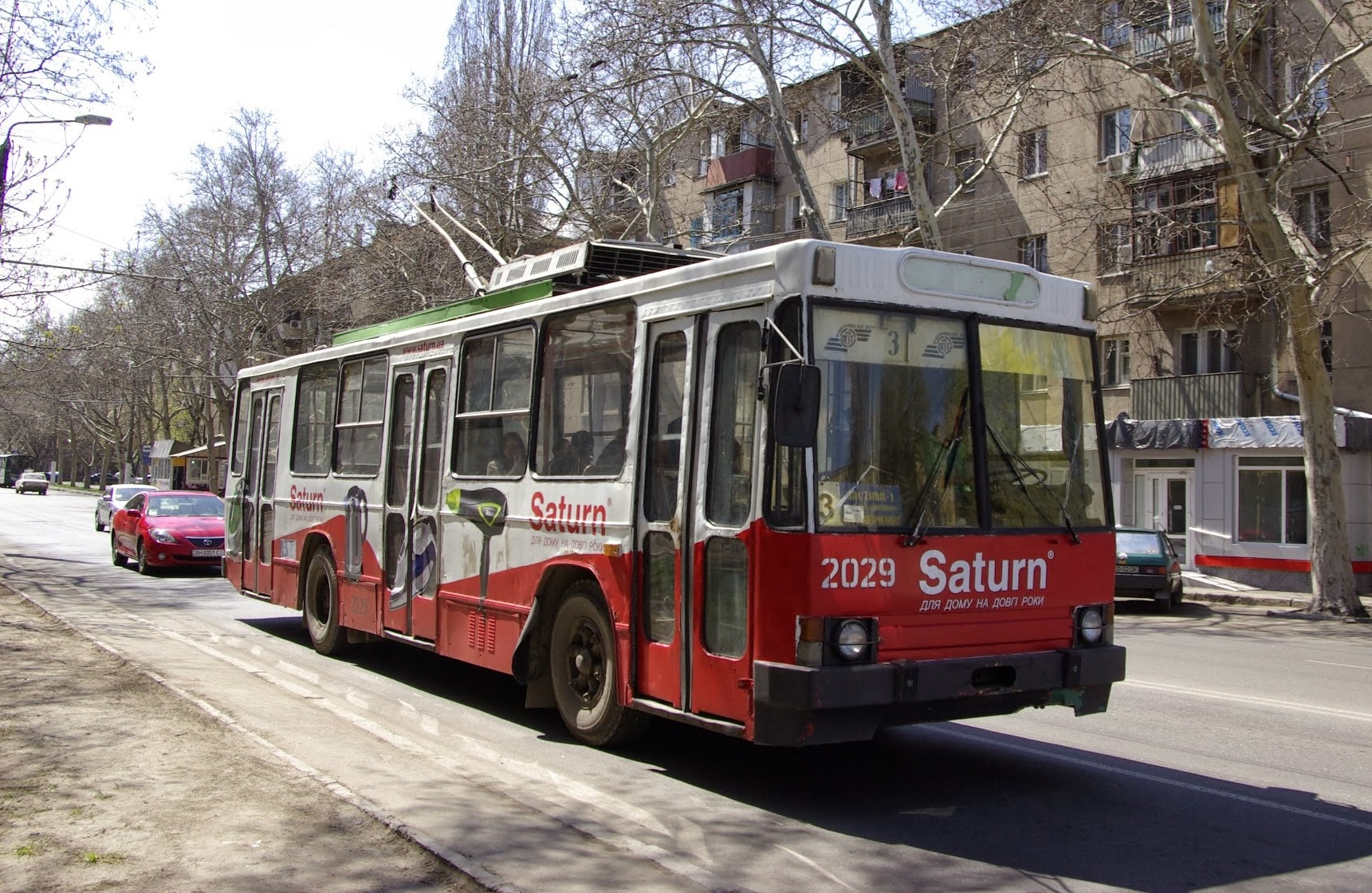
Pre-facelift YuMZ T2 in Odesa

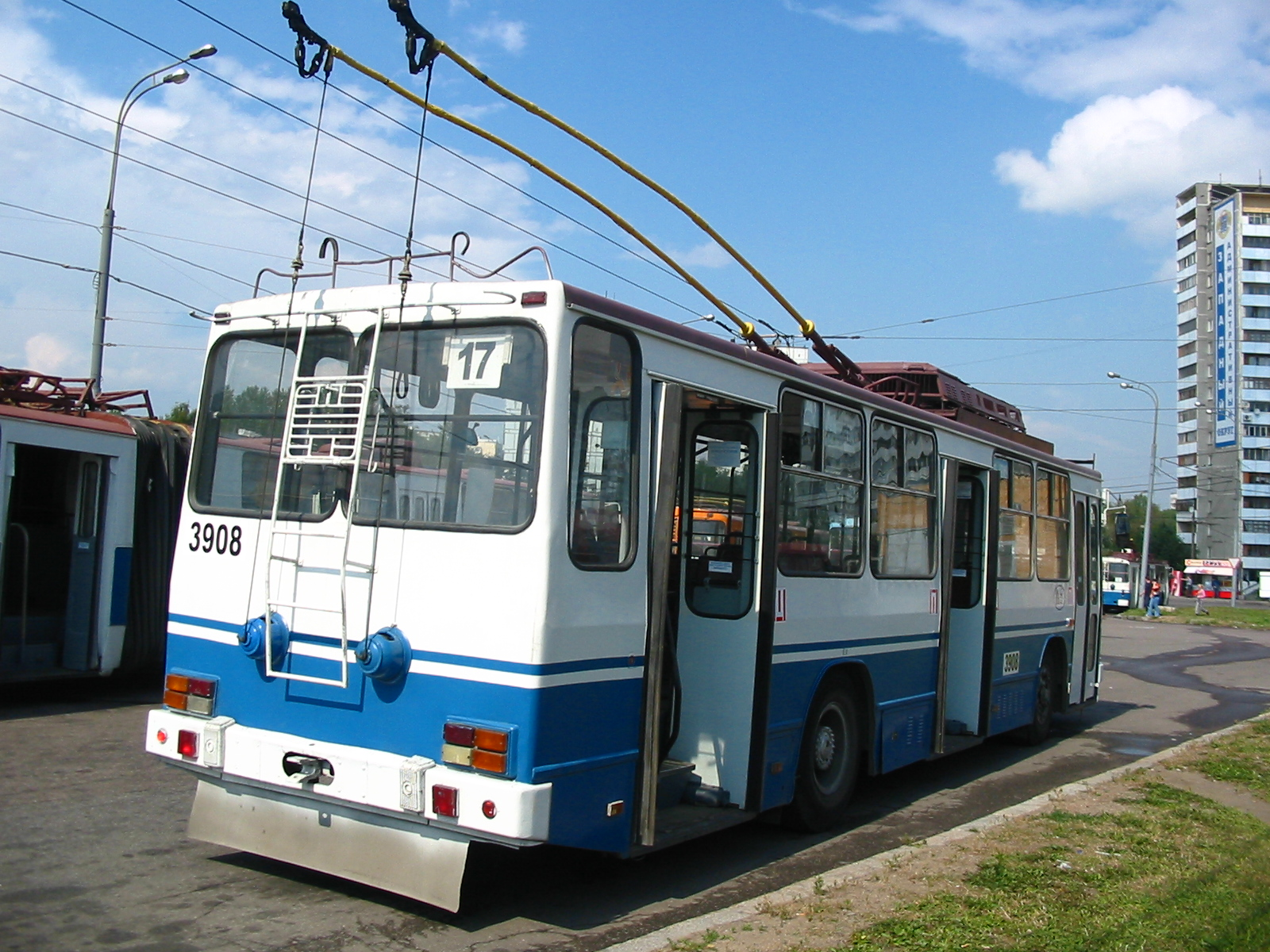
YuMZ T2 in Moscow

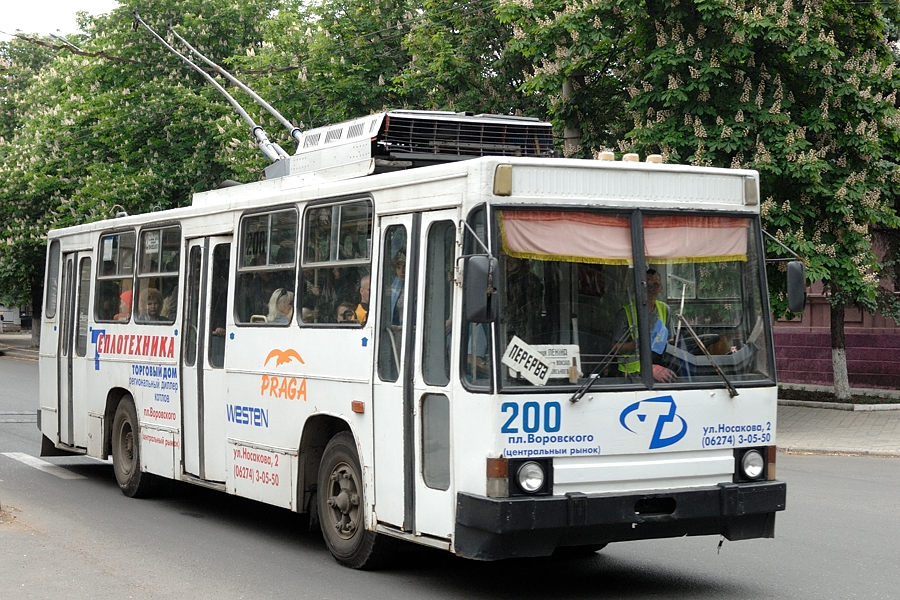
YuMZ T1R, a shortened YuMZ T1, in Bakhmut

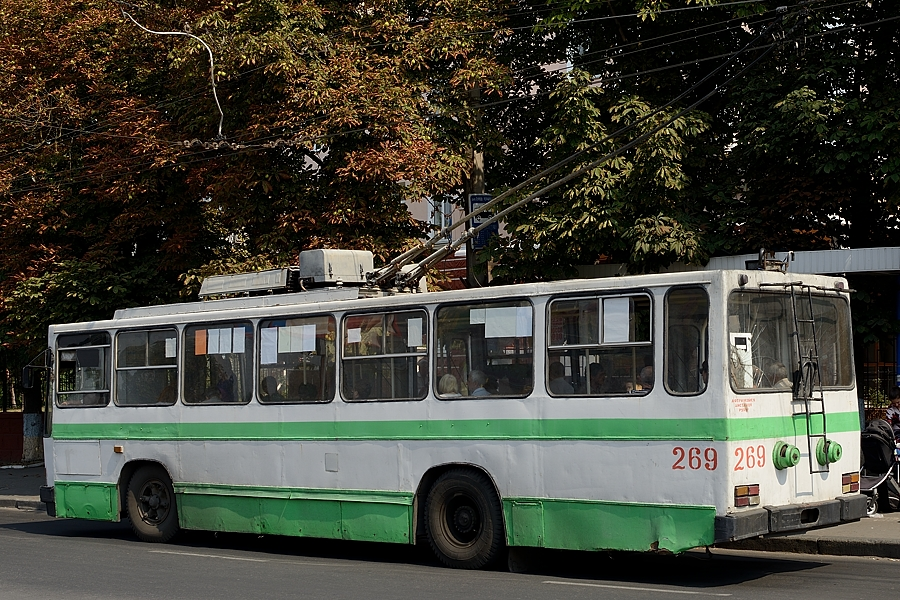
YuMZ T1R, a shortened YuMZ T1, in Khmelnytskyi

== Kyiv-12 (1996–2005) ==
Kyiv-12
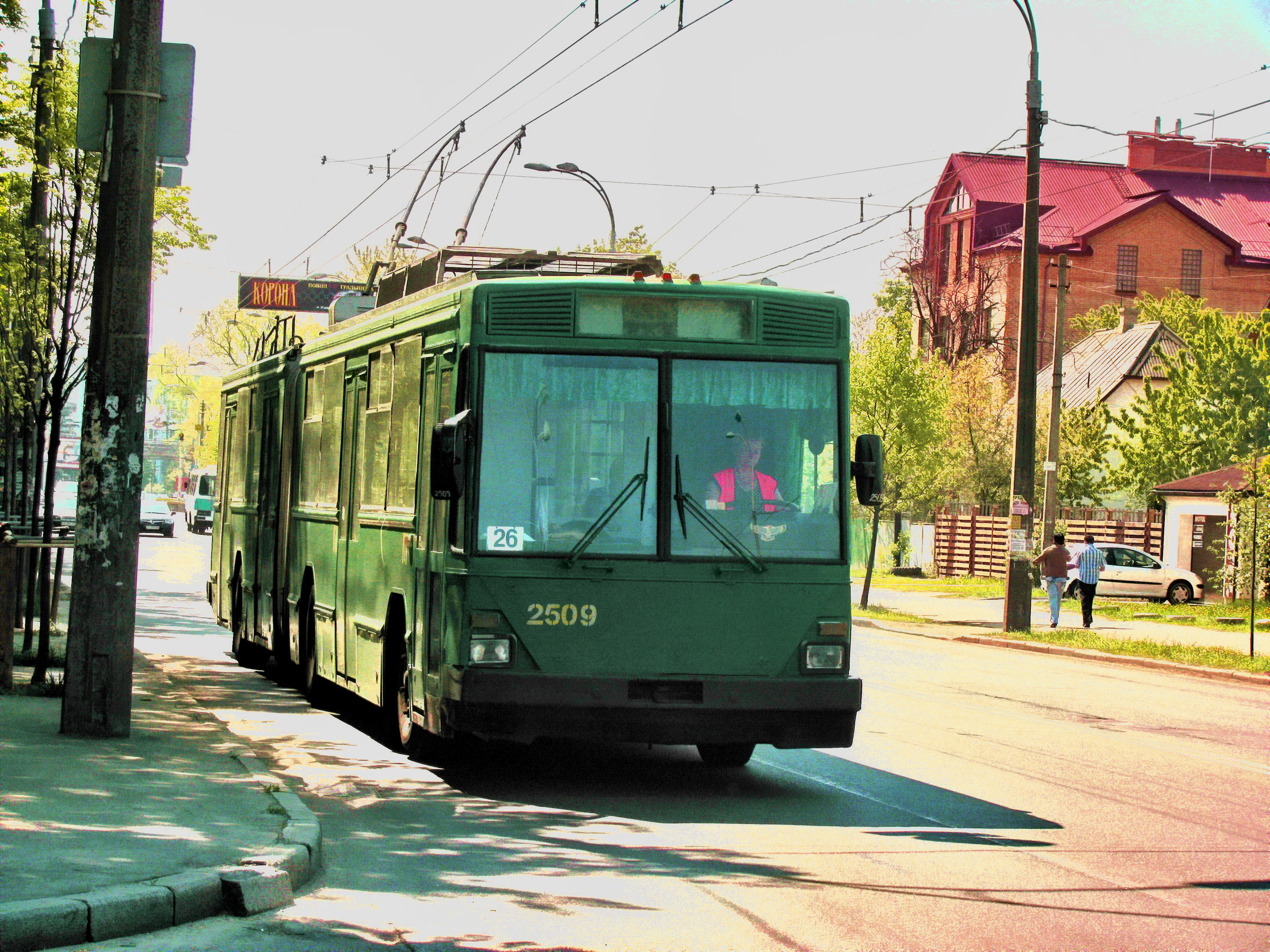
- AVIANT Kyiv-12.03 in Kyiv

Overview
- Manufacturer: KZET; AVIANT
- Model years: 1996–2005
- Assembly: Kyiv, Ukraine (KZET); Kyiv, Ukraine (AVIANT)
- Designer: Antonov

Body and chassis
- Class: Trolleybus
- Body style: Single-deck

Powertrain
- Electric motor: Škoda 9AL-2943 rN

Dimensions
- Wheelbase: 6,520 mm (21 ft 4 3/4 in) (axis 1-2); 5,400 mm (17 ft 8 5/8 in) (axis 2-3)
- Length: 18,300 mm (60 ft 1/2 in) (Kyiv-12.03); 11,550 mm (37 ft 10 3/4 in) (Kyiv-12.04)
- Width: 2,530 mm (8 ft 3 5/8 in) (Kyiv-12.03); 2,500 mm (8 ft 2 3/8 in) (Kyiv-12.04)
- Height: 3,570 mm (11 ft 8 1/2 in) (Kyiv-12.03); 3,600 mm (11 ft 9 3/4 in) (Kyiv-12.04)
- Curb weight: 17,450 kg (38,470 lb) (Kyiv-12.03); 9,300 kg (20,500 lb) (Kyiv-12.04)

Chronology
- Predecessor: Kyiv-11

After the failed project of Kyiv-11 KZET began to work on its successor, this time they've got assistance of the aircraft manufacturers Antonov and AVIANT that used to assemble cargo planes, including the world's largest An-225 Mriya, but after the dissolution of the USSR were struggling from lack of orders. The new trolleybus had the same proportions but more futuristic design, to solve the durability problems it was decided to build a body out of duralumin used in aircraft production. The first prototype of Kyiv-12 has been assembled in 1993 for testing in Kyiv.

Due to lack of funding KZET was forced to leave the project and return to tram modernization, leaving the further production to AVIANT. In 1995 the second prototype called Kyiv-12.01 was assembled, instead of Russian Dinamo motor it had a Czech one from Škoda 15Tr. It was proven to be more reliable than its predecessors and went on to work on Kyiv's trolleybus network, while Antonov was designing the production version of the model.

In 1996 AVIANT assembled the first unit of the Kyiv-12.03 serial model, it received a rectangular headlights, green paint job and a front chrome nameplate consisting of the Antonov emblem and 'Київський' lettering ('Kyivan' in Ukrainian). In 1997 Kyiv-12.05 was designed, the model had thyristor drive designed by Russian and Ukrainian experts, in 1998 it was brought to Russian Kursk for presentation. Only two units had been produced, one of them returned to Kyiv and was fitted with Škoda's electronics and the other one went on to work as a rental excursion trolleybus in Cherkasy.

Since 1998 Kyiv-12.03 began to be supplied to Kyiv, some of the batches were sponsored by Prominvestbank and had 'Промінвестбанк - Киянам' written on the sides ('From Prominvestbank for Kyivans' in Ukrainian). During production the design got simplified, in 1999 Antonov logo disappeared from the front mask and the lettering began to be written with paint, since 2002 Antonov and AVIANT logos were written on the sides.

In 1999 AVIANT designed the shortened version of the trolleybus called Kyiv-12.04. The model has never made it into serial production and only two units were built, the first one has been working in Kyiv in 2000–2017 and the second one works in Crimea since 2007, being a part of Kyiv trolleybus batch sent to the peninsula alongside three Kyiv-12.03. Crimean Kyiv-12.04 had 'Крымский' written on the front ('Crimean' in Russian) and Kyiv-12.03 had 'Симферопольский' inscription (Simferopolitan in Russian).

Other modifications were planned but never produced. The last Kyiv-12.03 has been assembled in 2005 and were delivered in 2007. After the 2008–2009 Ukrainian financial crisis, AVIANT became a part of Antonov concern, eventually getting renamed to Antonov Serial Production Plant. Since then the factory focused solely on aircraft assembly, abandoning the public transport industry.

=== Modifications ===
- Kyiv-12 (1993) — first prototype
- Kyiv-12.01 (1995) — second prototype
- Kyiv-12.03 (1996–2005) — articulated version
- Kyiv-12.04 (1999, 2004) — short version
- Kyiv-12.05 (1997–1998) — thyristor drive articulated prototype

=== Gallery ===
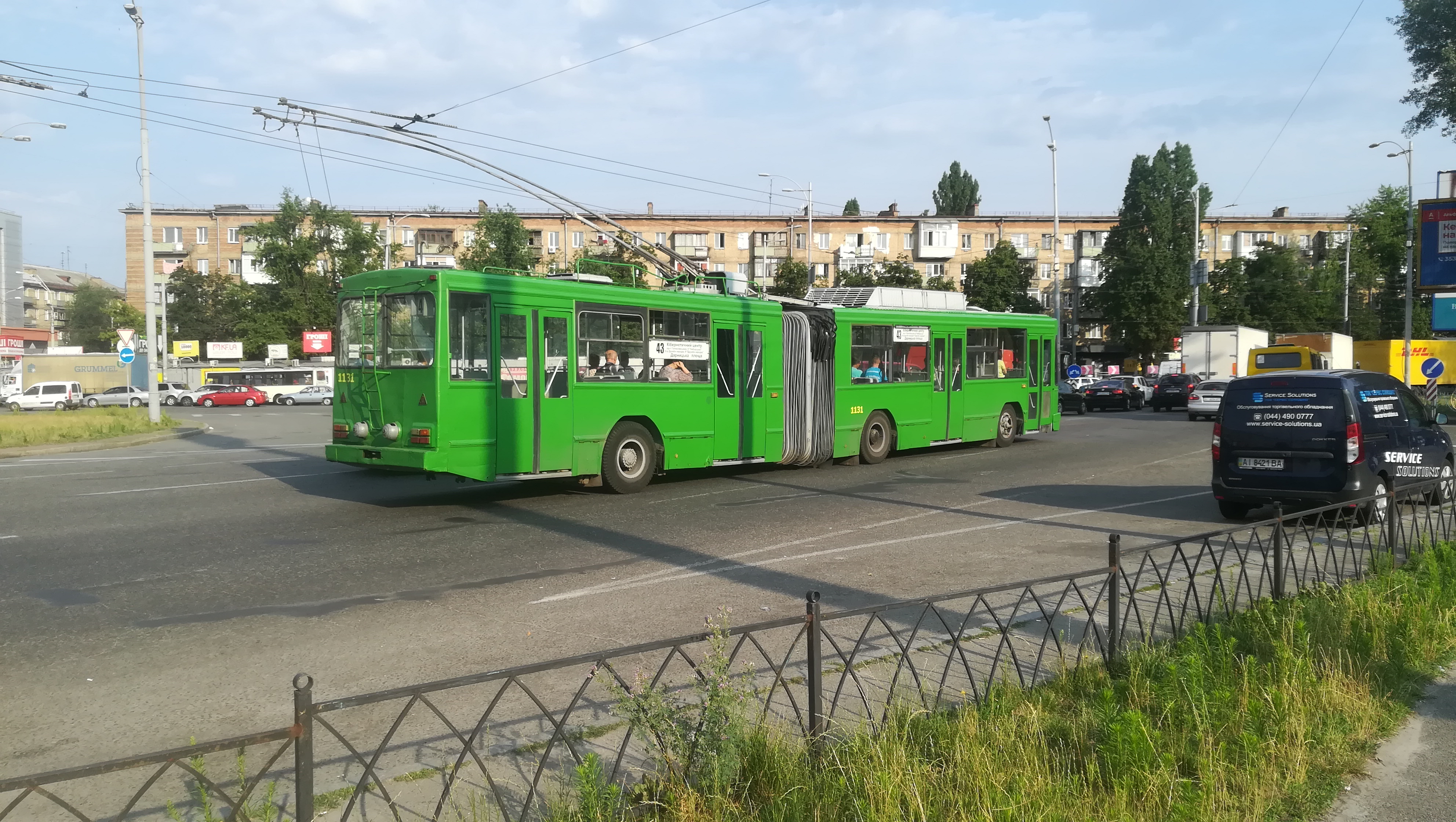
Kyiv-12.03 in Kyiv

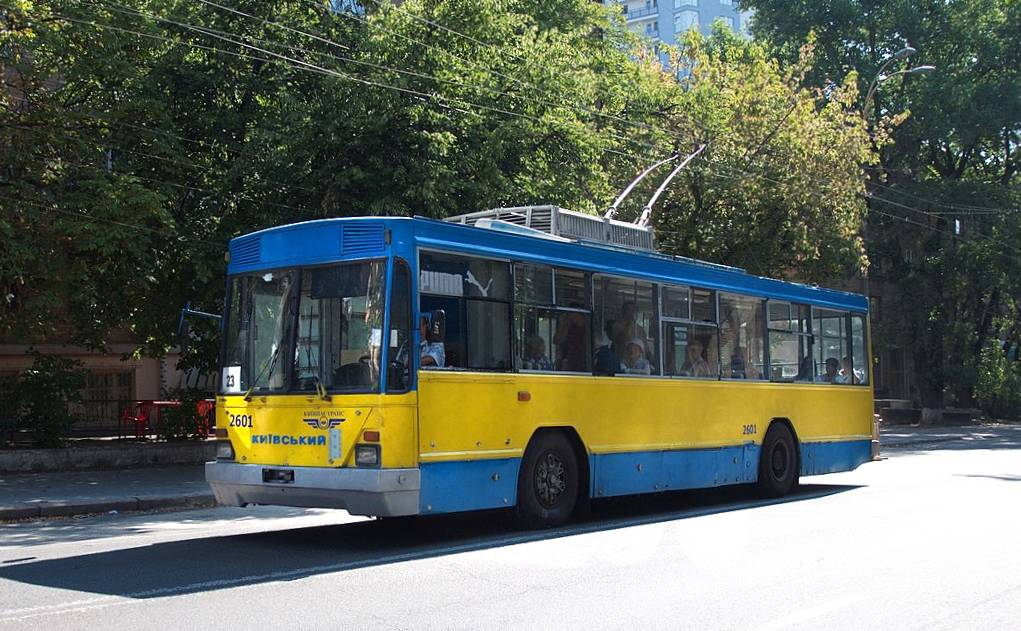
Kyiv-12.04 in Kyiv

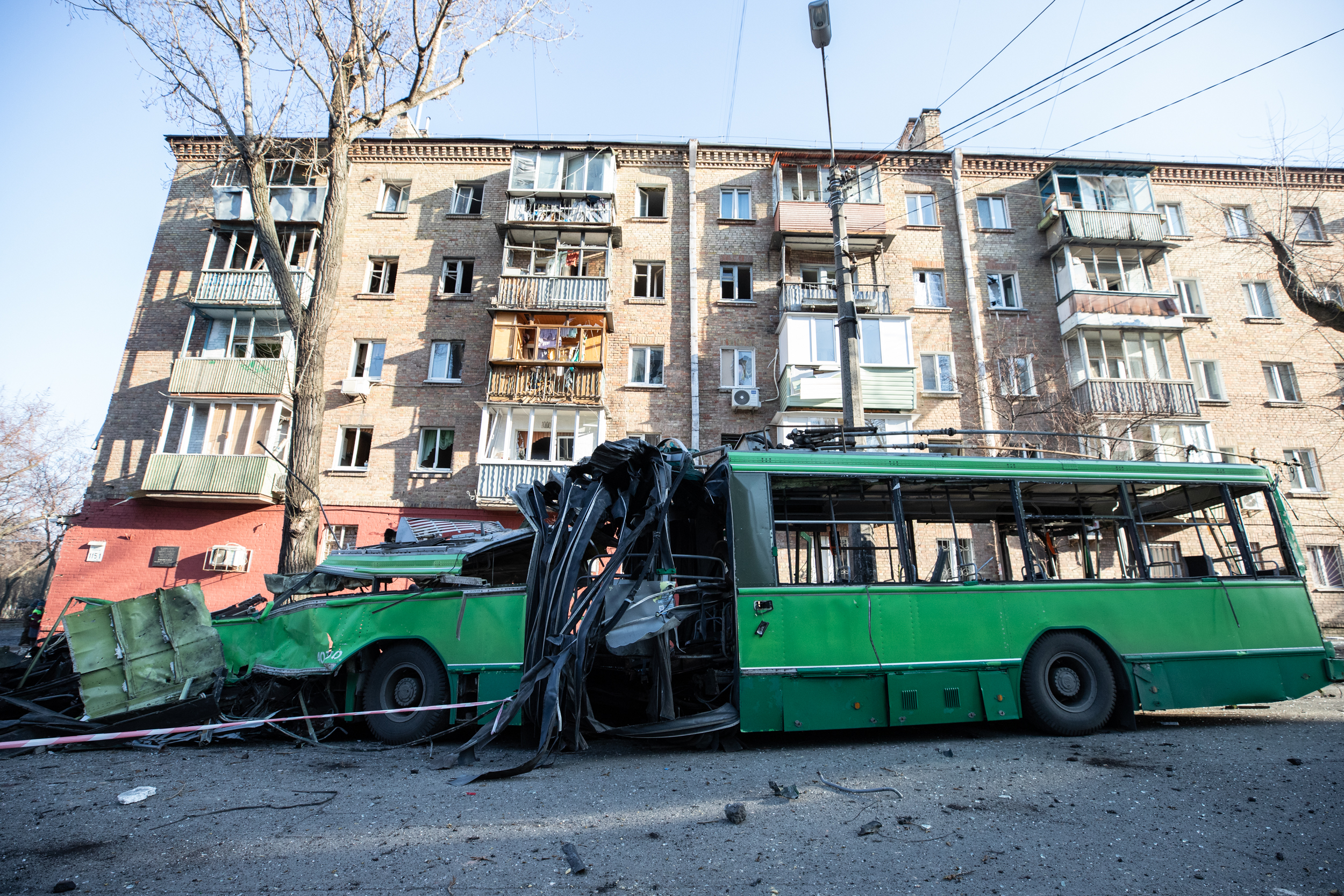
Kyiv-12.03 destroyed by missile strike after being used as a barricade in the 2022 Battle of Kyiv
