= Crimean Trolleybus =

Trolleybus line in Crimea

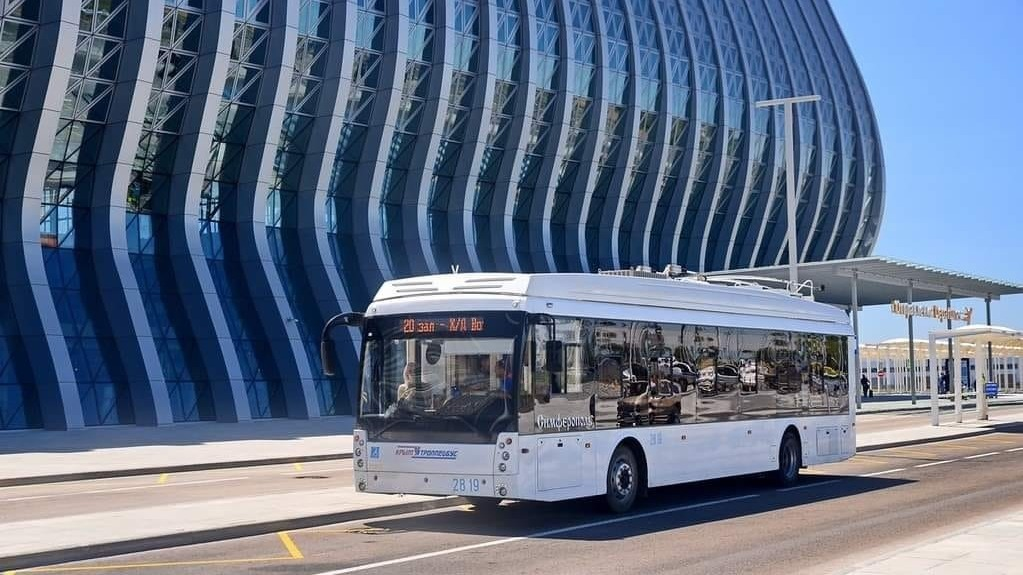
- Trolza 5265 Megapolis passing by Simferopol International Airport in 2020

Operation
- Locale: Crimea, Ukraine (Controlled by Russia)
- Open: November 6, 1959
- Status: Open
- Operator: Krymtrolleybus

Infrastructure
- Electrification: 600 V DC parallel overhead lines

Statistics
- Route length: 86 km (53 mi) (line 52)

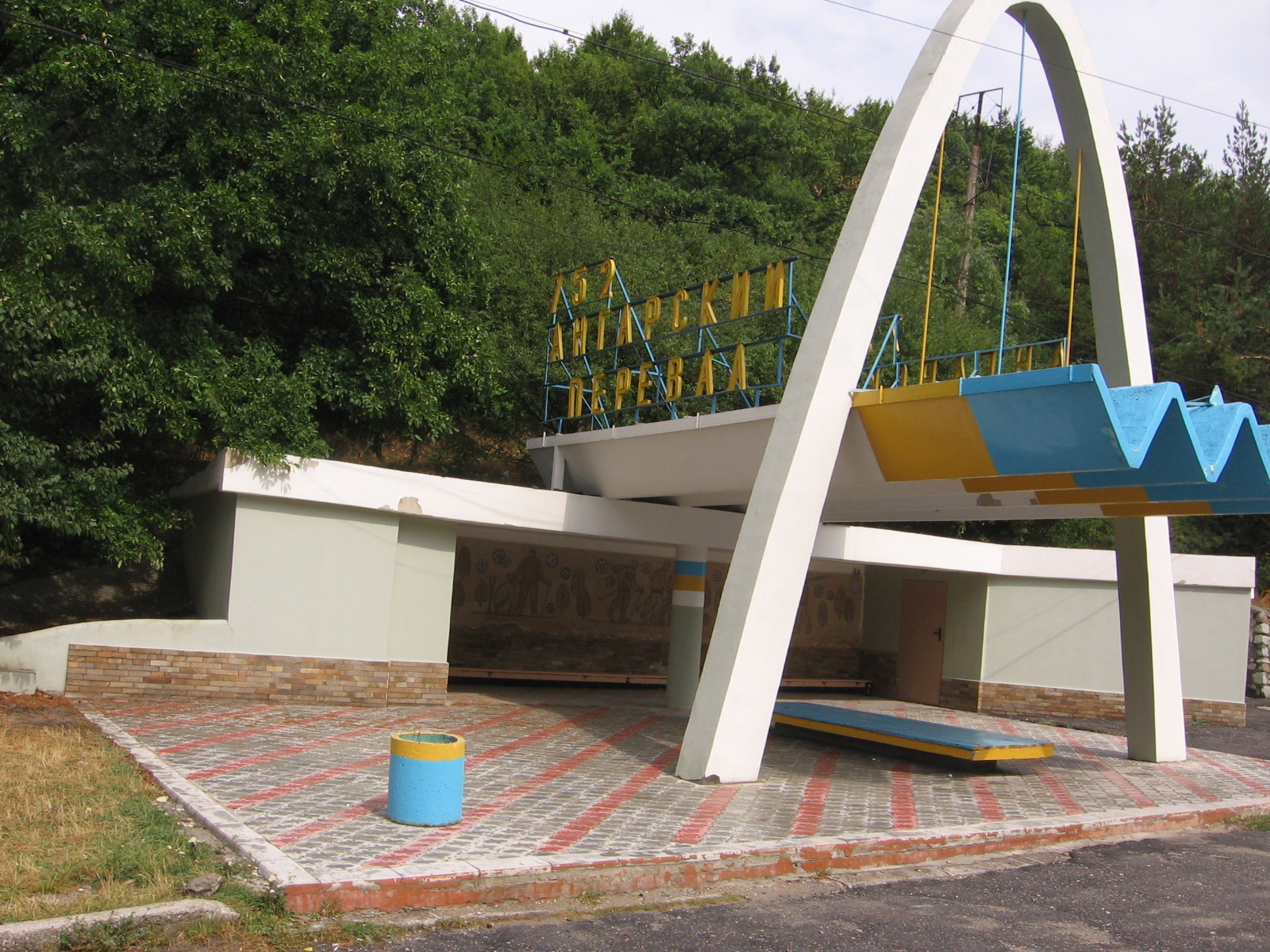
Trolleybus shelter at Angarskyi Pass (elevation 752 metres)

The Crimean Trolleybus (Note: Russian: Крымский троллейбус, romanized: Krymskiy trolleybus; Ukrainian: Кримський тролейбус, romanized: Krymskyi troleibus; Crimean Tatar: Къырым троллейбусы, romanized: Qırım trolleybusı) is a trolleybus system serving the cities of Simferopol, Alushta and Yalta in Crimea. It consists of urban lines within the three cities, as well as intercity lines connecting them, including line 52 Simferopol-Alushta-Yalta, which at 86 kilometres (53 mi) is the world's longest trolleybus line.

Managed by the public transport company Krymtrolleybus, it was built in 1959 in the Ukrainian SSR as an alternative to extending the railway line in Simferopol over the mountains to the coast. It opened in two parts: Simferopol–Alushta in 1959 and Alushta–Yalta in 1961. The journey time to Alushta is about 1 1/2 hours, to Yalta about 2 1/2 hours, and the fare is about ₴15 (since March 2014, ₽58).

It passes through the Crimean Mountains across the Angarskyi Pass, reaching 752 metres (2,500 ft) at the highest point, then descends to the resort town of Alushta on the coast. The remaining distance to Yalta is 41 kilometres (25 mi) and winds around the mountains above the sea.

== Vehicle fleet ==
=== Current ===
Picture	Manufacturer	Model	Quantity	Since
	(Ukraine) Antonov	Kyiv-12.04	1	2004
	(Ukraine) Bogdan	T701; T801	82; 2	2010; 2011
	(Russia) Trolza	5265 Megapolis	96	2013
	(Russia) VMZ	5298 Avangard	26	2015
	(Russia) SVARZ (Belarus) MAZ	6275	14	2016
	(Russia) Sinara	6254	1	2026

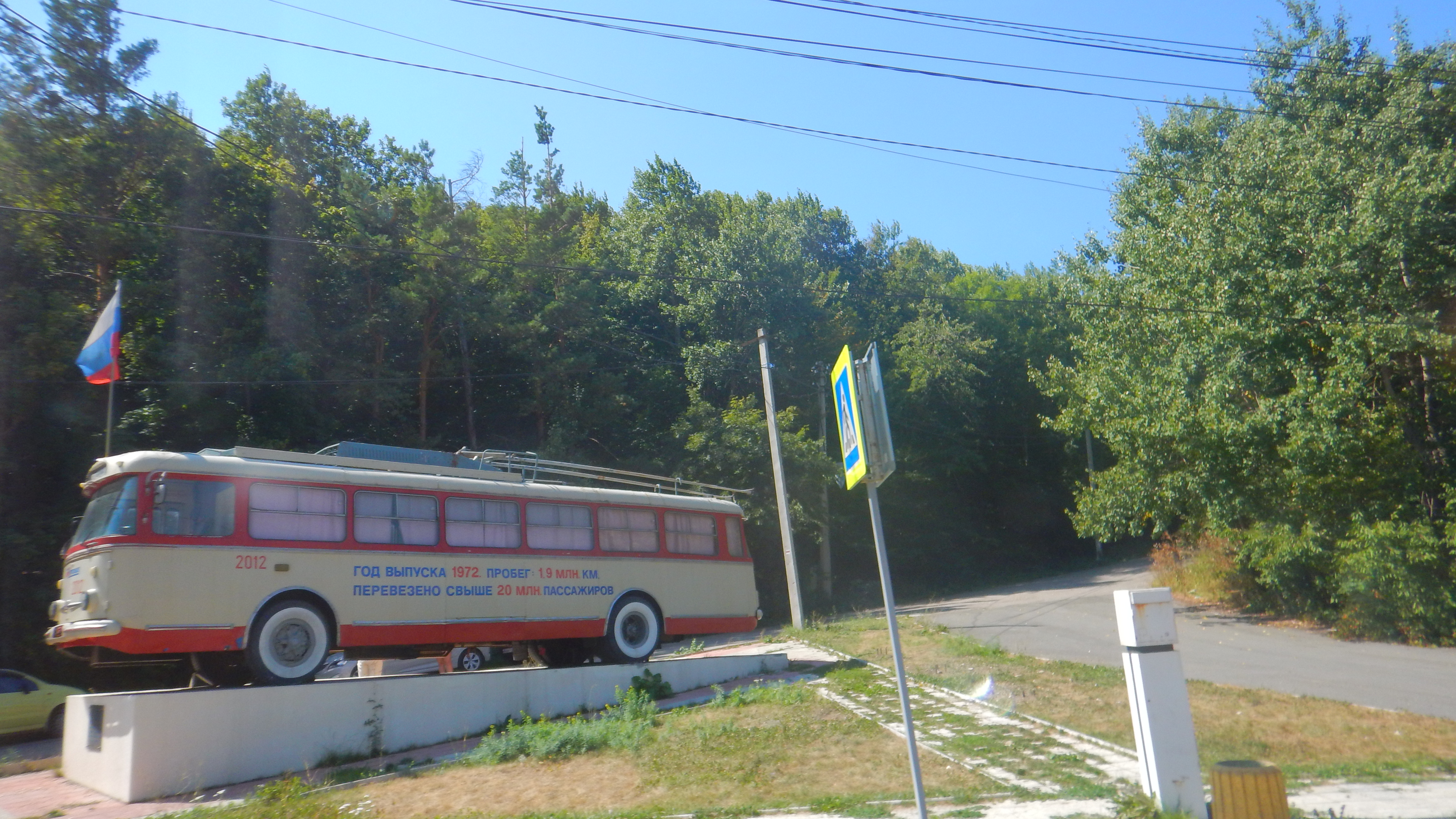
Crimean Trolleybus Monument

=== Historical ===
Picture	Manufacturer	Model	Quantity	Years
	(Czech Republic) Škoda	8Tr	94	1959–1979
	(Czech Republic) Škoda	9Tr	561	1961–2018
	(Czech Republic) Škoda	14Tr; 15Tr	163; 6	1980–2020; 1990–2015
	(Ukraine) YuMZ	T1; T2	8; 11	1995–2011; 1995–2014
	(Russia) Trolza	620501	3	1994–2010
	(Ukraine) Antonov	Kyiv-12.03	3	2004–2023
	(Belarus) BKM	32102	5	2008–2016

== See also ==
- List of trolleybus systems in Ukraine
- List of trolleybus systems in Russia
