= Angarskyi Pass =

Mountain pass in Crimea

Coordinates: 44°45′30″N 34°20′27″E

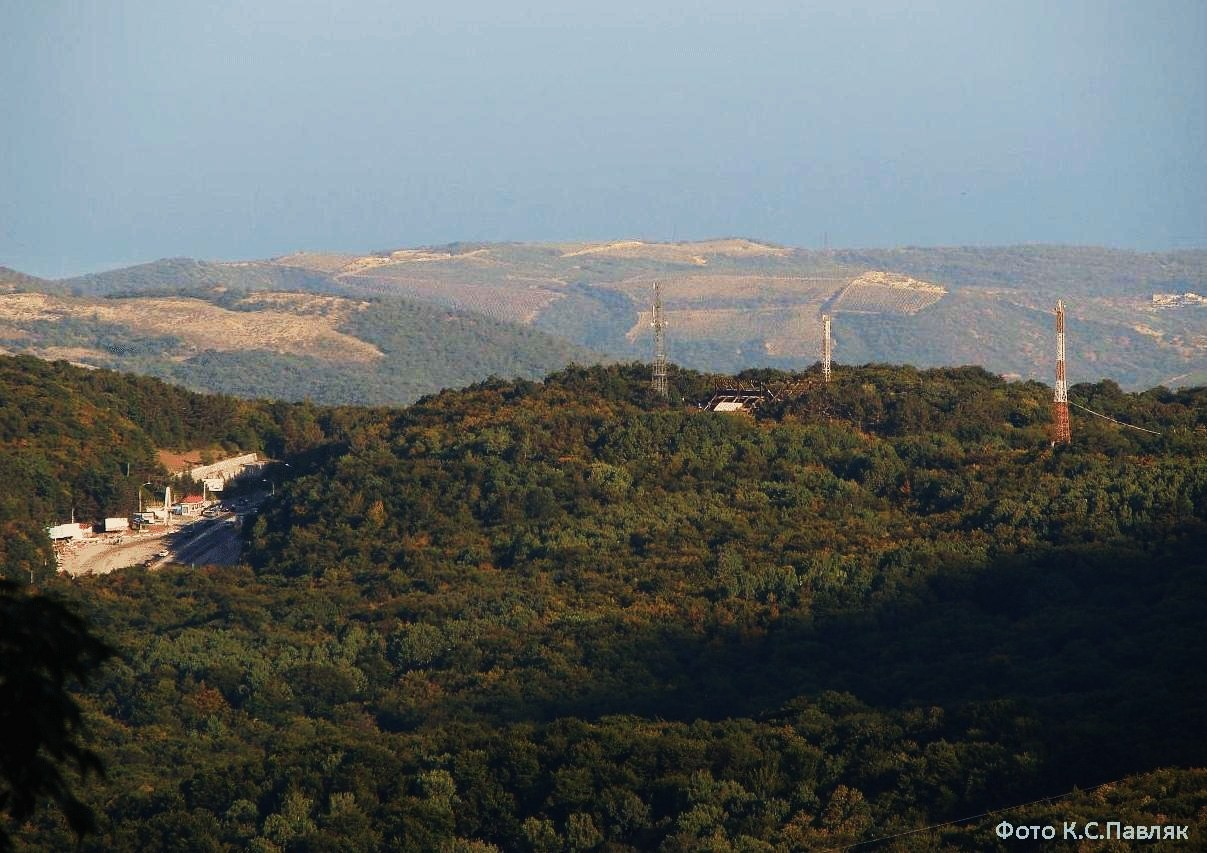
Angarskyi Pass view from Chatyr-Dag.

The Angarskyi Pass (Ukrainian: Ангарський перевал; Russian: Ангарский перевал; Crimean Tatar: Anğara boğazı) is a mountain pass of the Crimean Mountains on the Crimean peninsula. The pass is the highest point on the Simferopol–Alushta roadway, at 752 metres (2,467 ft) above sea level. It takes its name from the Angara River, a tributary of the Salhir.

During the Middle Ages, only a small footpath ran through the pass. The first postal route going through the Angarskyi Pass was laid by Russian pioneers in 1824–26. The road was expanded two times, once in 1935 and in 1959, when the Crimean Trolleybus line opened. The road that runs through the pass currently contains a Government Automobile Inspection of Ukraine, a control post and a trolleybus stop.

The Angarskyi Pass is a popular winter tourist resort in Crimea. Skiing is popular in the area during the winter time. In the vicinity of the Angarskyi Pass, the sport of orienteering is popular.
