= Škoda 15Tr =

Articulated trolleybus produced by Škoda Transportation

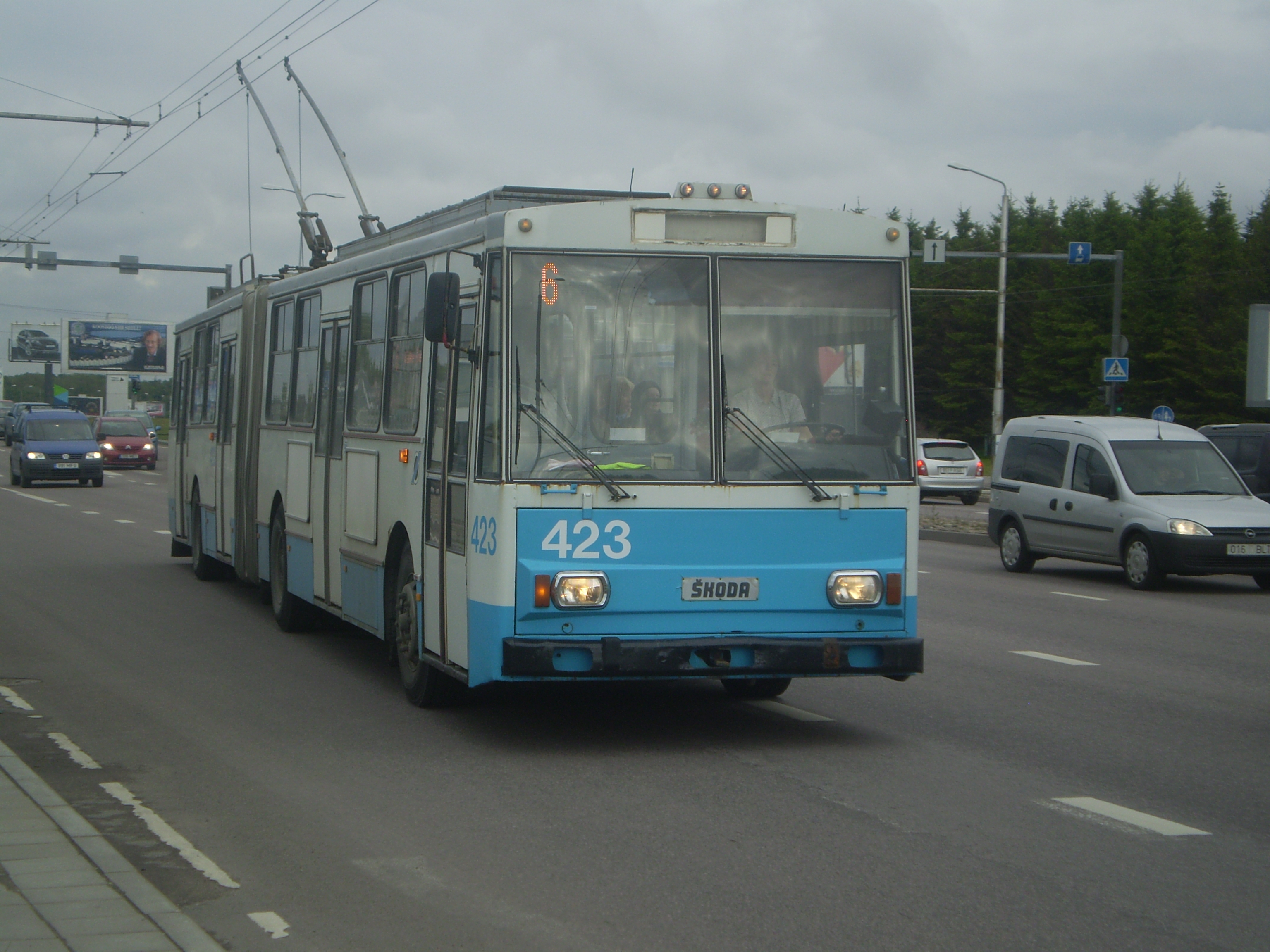
- Škoda 15Tr in Tallinn, Estonia

Overview
- Manufacturer: Škoda Transportation

Body and chassis
- Doors: 4
- Floor type: high-floor

Powertrain
- Electric motor: Škoda 6 AL 2943 rN, Škoda 9 AL 2943 rN
- Capacity: 145 passengers
- Power output: 2 x 100kW - 2 x 120 kW

Dimensions
- Length: 17,360 mm (56 ft 11 1/2 in)
- Width: 2,500 mm (8 ft 2 3/8 in)
- Height: 3,410 mm (11 ft 2 1/4 in)
- Curb weight: 15,800 kg (34,800 lb)

Škoda 15Tr is an articulated trolleybus produced by Škoda Transportation from 1988 to 2004, since 1995 in modernized version 15TrM. It is a longer version of Škoda 14Tr.

== Construction features ==
Electric motors are located in the middle and rear of the bus. Inside the bus, leatherette or plastic Vogelsitze seats were used. Rear B and C axles are powered. On the right side of the bus are four doors.

== Production and operation ==
=== Škoda 15Tr ===
Production of 15Tr started in 1988 and continued until 2004. 469 trolleybuses were produced and delivered to various cities in Czech Republic, Estonia, Hungary, Iran, Latvia, Lithuania, Slovakia, Ukraine.

Variations:

- Škoda 15Tr
- Škoda 15Tr02/6
- Škoda 15Tr02/7
- Škoda 15Tr03/6
- Škoda 15Tr07/6
- Škoda 15Tr07/7
- Škoda 15Tr08/6
- Škoda 15Tr09/7
- Škoda 15Tr10/7
- Škoda 15Tr11/7
- Škoda 15Tr12/6
- Škoda 15Tr13/6M
- Škoda 15Tr13/7M

=== Škoda 15TrSF ===
15TrSF was in service in the United States until 2016, which was built by ETI for Muni public transit system in San Francisco, California, US.

=== Škoda 15Tr01 ===
Production of 15TrM started in 1995 and continued until 2005. 121 trolleybuses were produced and delivered to various cities in Czech Republic, Latvia and Slovakia.

Variations:

- Škoda 15TrMM
